= Law enforcement in Ukraine =

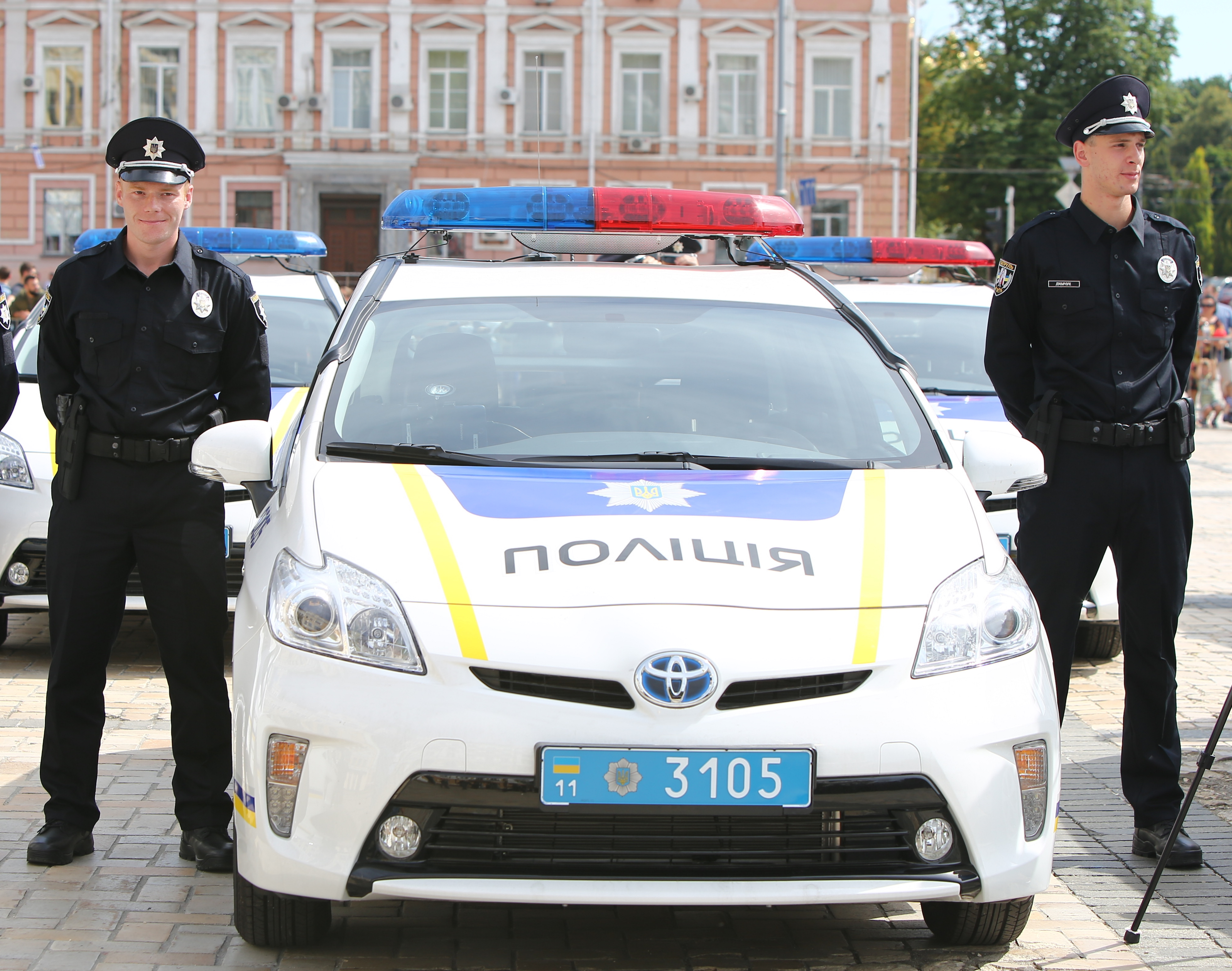
Ukrainian patrol police officers near their service car.

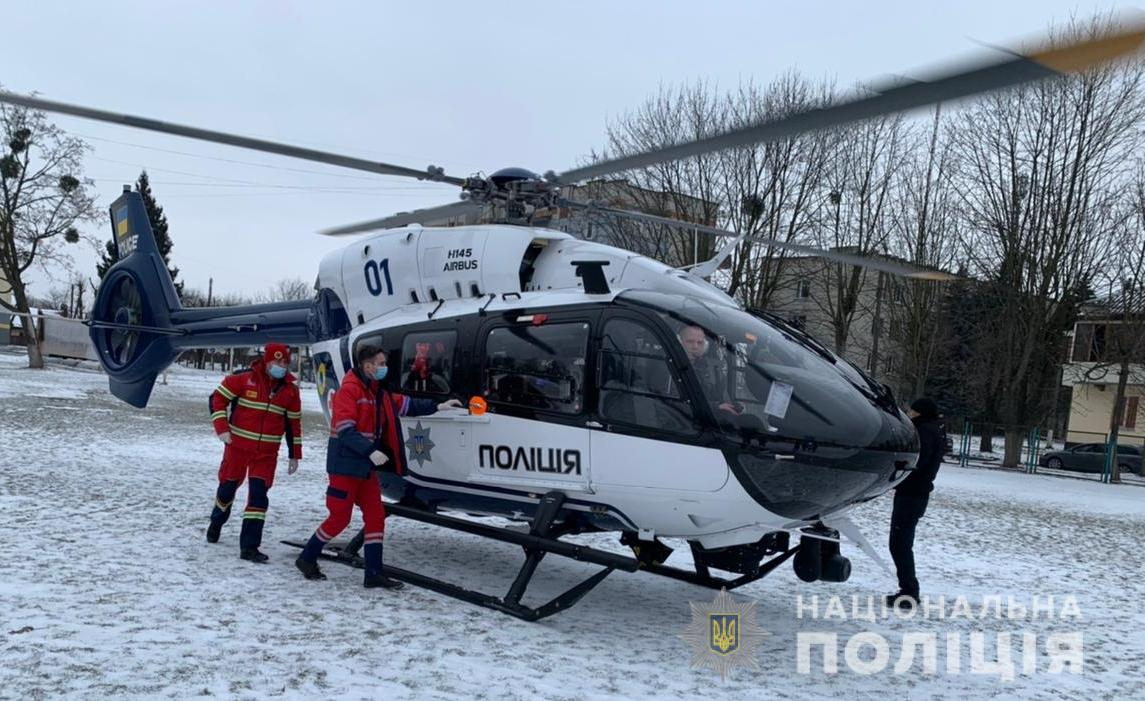
Paramedics near a police helicopter, which is also used as an air ambulance.

Law enforcement in Ukraine is a set of activities carried out by a system of dedicated government bodies, aimed at maintaining public order and internal security, ensuring integrity of the law and inevitability of punishment for breaking the law, guarding the national security as well as safety of people and their property. Most law enforcement operations are carried out by the Ministry of Internal Affairs (MIA), but also by a number of independent agencies and agencies from other ministries.

The primary law enforcement agency in the country is the National Police of Ukraine, which is subordinate to the Ministry of Internal Affairs. Other prominent agencies include Security Service of Ukraine (an independent agency, responsible for national security, anti-terrorism, counter-intelligence and fighting organized crime), National Guard of Ukraine (part of MIA, the national gendarmerie) and State Bureau of Investigation (an independent agency, investigating misdemeanors and crimes committed by other law enforcement officers, judges, and high-ranking officials).

Due to the fact that Ukraine is a unitary state, the law enforcement is centralized at the national-level and is carried out by national level bodies. All law enforcement officers, although usually attached to a certain territory and working primarily inside that territory, retain their powers anywhere in the country. Local governments do not have their own forces, except municipal guard forces, which have limited scopes and powers. The law framework in Ukraine is also national level only, territorial subdivisions do not have their own legislation, unlike in federated states. However, local governments can issue limited scope decrees that are enforced by the law enforcement bodies, for example for regulation of alcohol or usage of fireworks.

There is a dedicated system for corruption crimes which is separate from the rest of law enforcement. The military used to have their own justice system as well, but it was shut down in the beginning of the 2010s, and now there are discussions about bringing it back.

Some of the Ukrainian law enforcement agencies are also military formations, in particular National Guard of Ukraine, State Border Guard Service of Ukraine, Security Service of Ukraine and State Security Administration, which apart from their law enforcement activities are also tasked with purely military activities, and they are considered to be an integral part of the defence forces of Ukraine.

As of end of 2010s-start of 2020s, Ukraine had roughly 300 000 active law enforcement personnel, servicing the population of approximately 40 million: 135 thousand in the National Police, 60 thousand in the National Guard, 53 thousand in the Border Guard, 27 thousand in the Security Service, and around several thousand in each of the remaining law enforcement bodies. However, not all of them execute law enforcement duties, some of them are only active in the field of national defence.

Each law enforcement body tends to have its own special tactical team for such sensitive tasks as hostage rescue or apprehending well-armed criminals. For example, DOZOR in the Border Guard, KORD in the National Police, Alpha in the Security Service or Omega in the National Guard.

Ukraine inherited its law enforcement and justice systems from the Soviet Union (with militsiya being its core part), which were plagued by politisation, corruption, brutality and even fusing with the crime world. But after the Revolution of Dignity in 2014, the public demand for reforms drove the large-scale law enforcement and judicial reforms in Ukraine, which significantly improved transparency and integrity of law enforcement and judiciary, gradually making them more alike those in the other European countries and less post-Soviet. This article describes the law enforcement in Ukraine how it was from 2014 onward. Before 2014 the system of law enforcement was very different.

== History ==
=== Before 1991 ===
For most of their history (from the fall of Kyivan Rus in 1240 to the independence from the Soviet Union in 1991), Ukrainians did not have their statehood, so the law enforcement on the territories, that are now Ukraine, was carried out by the occupying powers and their respective agencies: Grand Duchy of Lithuania and Polish–Lithuanian Commonwealth in 13th–18th centuries, Russian Empire and Austria-Hungary in 18th–20th centuries, Soviet Union and Second Polish Republic in 20th century. Laws and their enforcement in those state entities tended to be at best very biased and discriminatory to Ukrainians, heavily favouring people of respective titular nations, and at worst being extremely oppressive and punitive to Ukrainians, treating them as second-class people or even as slaves with no rights. That created a longstanding strong tradition of distrust and antagonism to any law enforcement, which exists to this day.

The Rus Justice of 11th–12th century and the Statutes of Lithuania of 16th century are worth mentioning as the earliest known codified laws written in Ukrainian language and enforced on the territory of what is now Ukraine. They laid the foundation for the modern law in Eastern Europe and in Ukraine.

=== 1991–2014 ===
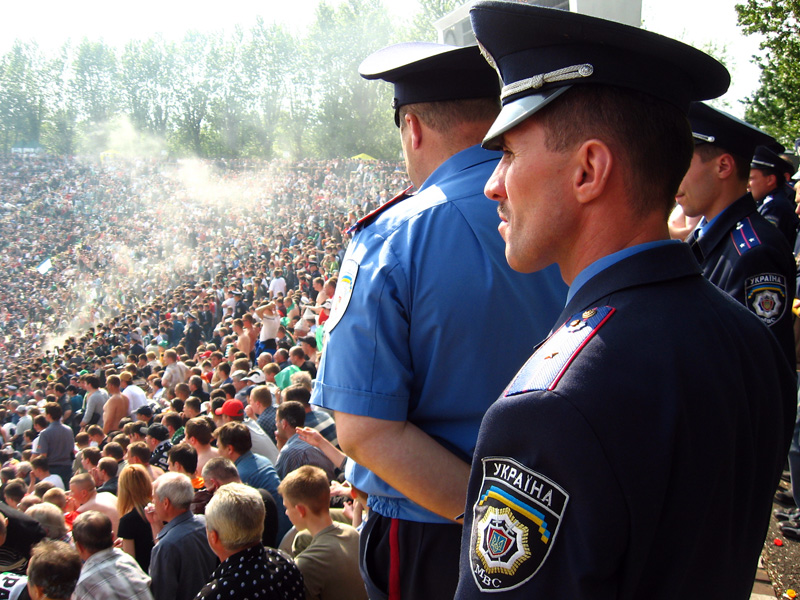
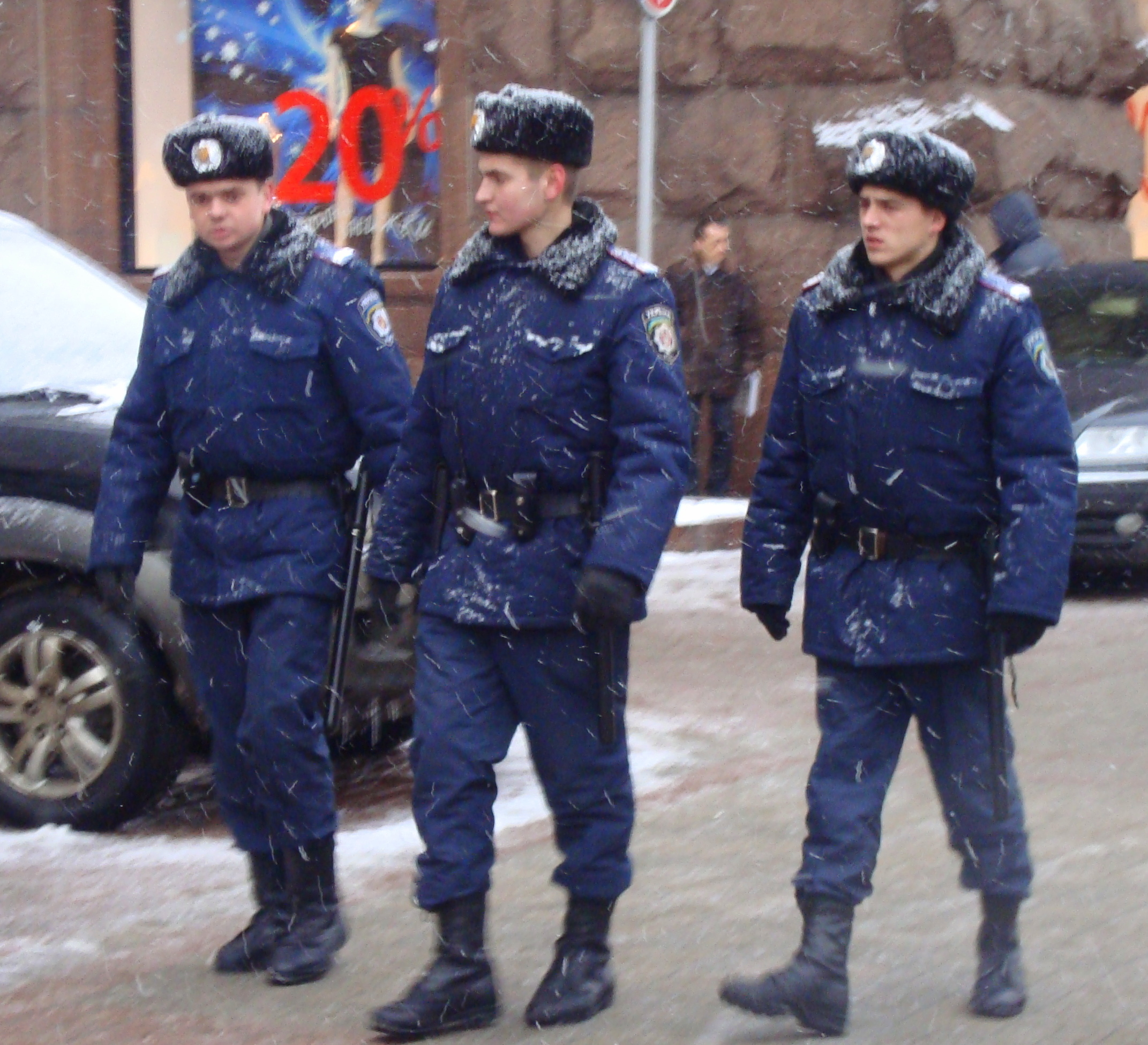
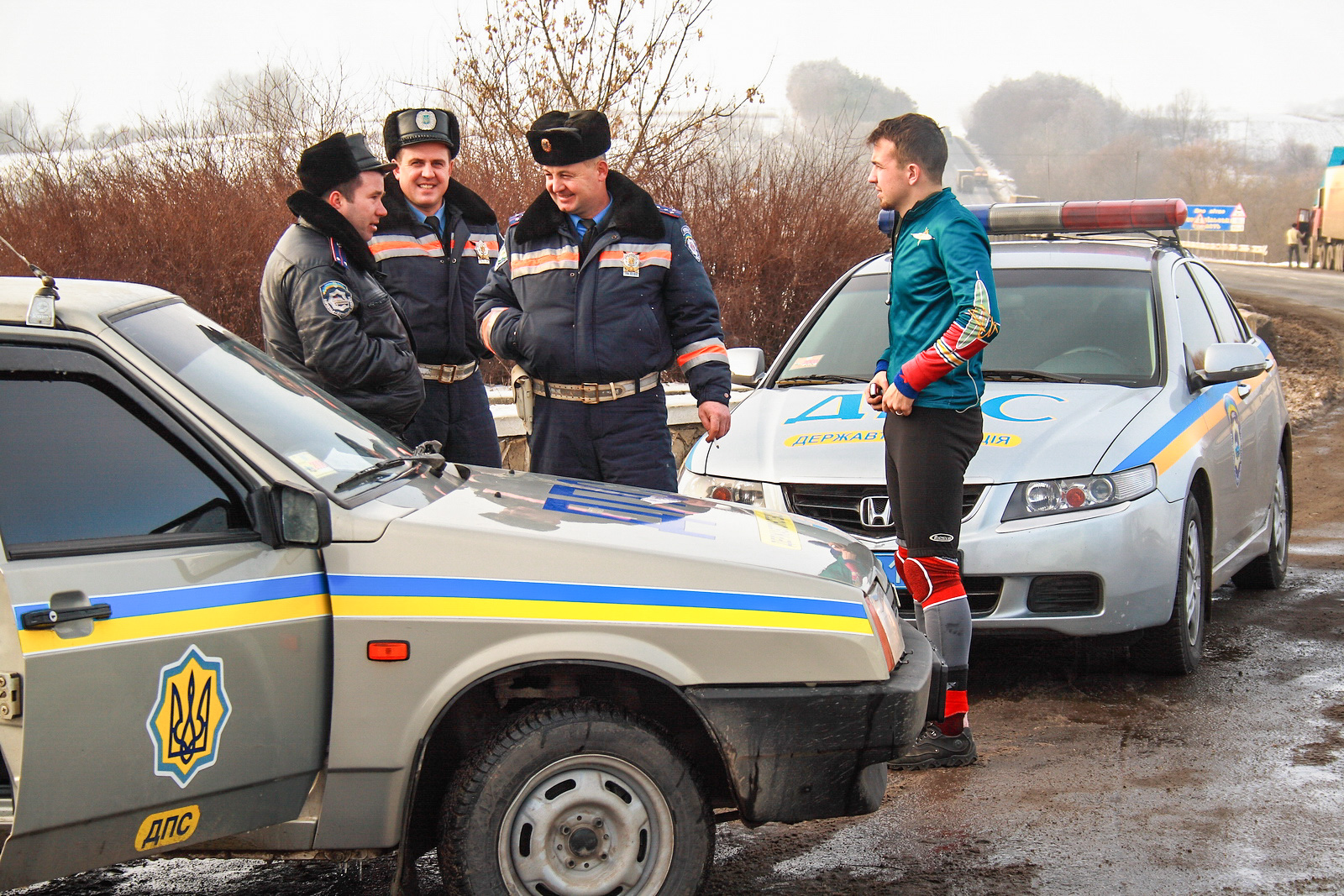
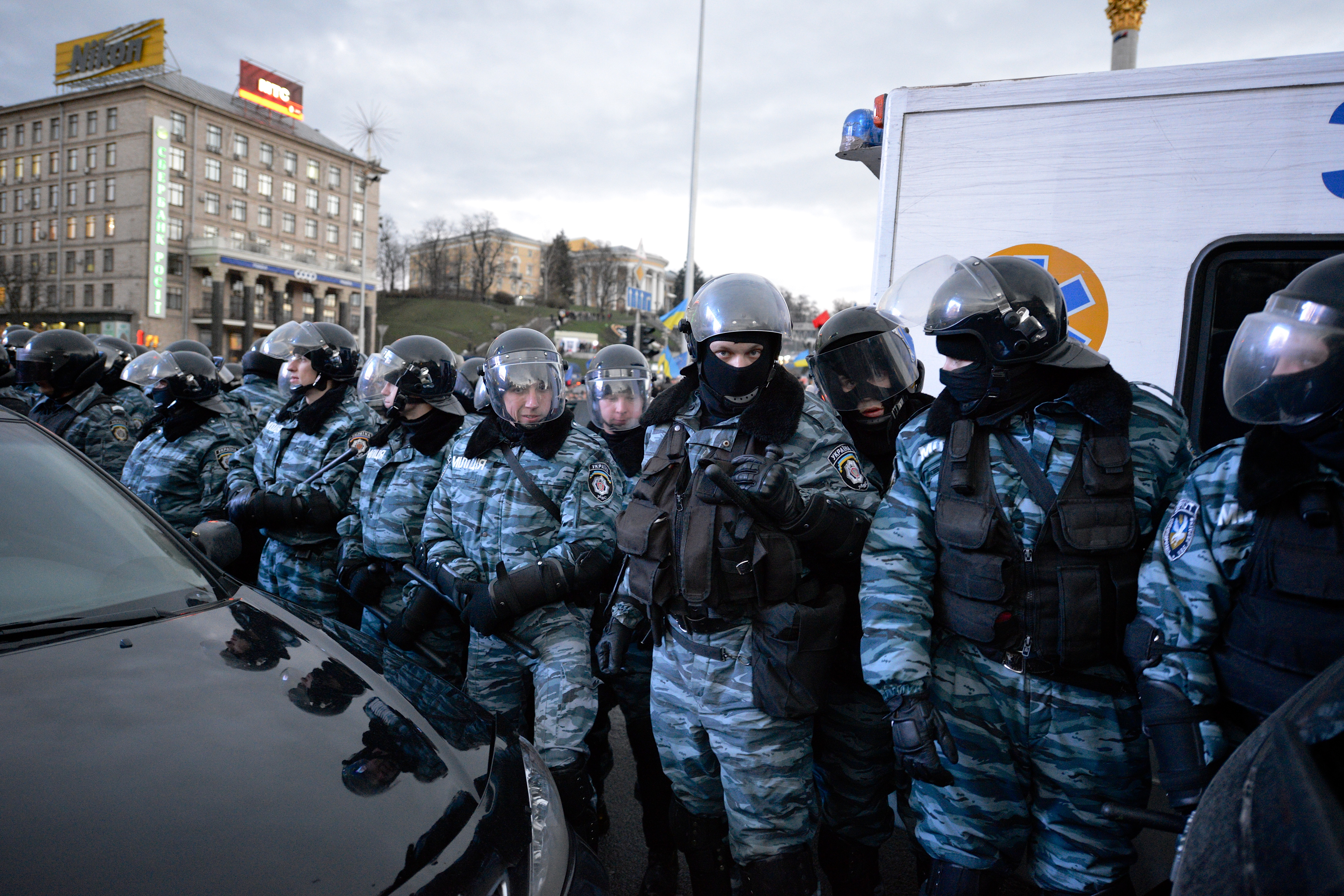
Historic photos of now disbanded militsiya:
Top left: Uniformed officers provide security at a football match in 2007.
Top right: Patrol officers in the center of Kyiv in 2010.
Bottom left: Traffic officers near their service cars in 2007.
Bottom right: Riot unit officers during Euromaidan in 2013.

When Ukraine proclaimed independence from the Soviet Union in 1991, the Ukrainian government just took over all Soviet law enforcement bodies operating on the Ukrainian territory, without reforming them any further than just renaming them. Soviet laws, procedures, practices, philosophy and society-government relations carried on, just under a different flag. This state of affairs remained pretty much unchanged until massive reforms began in 2014.

During this period, the two pillars of law enforcement in Ukraine were the Ministry of Internal Affairs and the Security Service, doing the absolute majority of the law enforcement activity in the country. There were not many other law enforcement bodies, and those that were present were much smaller and had much narrower scopes. The MIA was a law enforcement body in its own right, not a parent governing body for other law enforcement agencies as it is now. At that time, the word "militsiya" was used instead of the word "police". But militsiya was somewhat an abstraction: there was no legal entity for militsiya, its officers were officially employed directly in the MIA, militsiya units were embedded directly into the structure of the MIA. The Security Service of Ukraine was an immense structure, having an exorbitant range of duties and powers, from investigating tax evasion to carrying out foreign intelligence.

=== From 2014 onward ===
In aftermath of the Euromaidan and the following Revolution of Dignity in 2014, radical reforms of law enforcement and judiciary began in Ukraine, driven by the firm demand from the society, which would no longer tolerate the old flawed system, and by political pressure from the European Union, United States and other western partners, on which Ukraine became very dependent due to the beginning of an economic crisis and war with Russia. They usually conditioned their economic support on the progress of reforms in Ukraine, including reforms of law enforcement and judiciary. The EU treated progress in those reforms, especially progress in creation of the anticorruption system, as one of the key conditions for the EU-Ukraine association agreement, visa-free entry to EU for Ukrainian citizens and for accession of Ukraine to the European Union, i.e. whenever there were serious delays or disruptions to those reforms, the EU could temporarily suspend negotiations on those matters.

A new anticorruption law enforcement system was created from scratch in the mid-2010s, pushed by the western partners and by the civic society. The process of creation of this system was difficult, experiencing a lot of sabotage and opposition from different actors during its every stage. This problem gained the most publicity on 22 July 2025, when Verkhovna Rada voted in all three readings to eliminate independence of the anticorruption agencies and President signed this into law, all in one day. This immediately sparked mass protests, the very first of a kind since the beginning of Russian full-scale invasion, as well as a strong outcry from western partners, forcing them to revert a week later.

Previously, corruption crimes fell into jurisdiction of the Anticorruption department of SSU, which was found to be ineffective, prone to political influence and corrupt itself.

In 2014 it was decided to restore the National Guard of Ukraine, that existed before, but was disbanded in 2000. It was created on the basis of Internal Troops of Ukraine. The need to recreate the National Guard was driven by the start of Russo-Ukrainian war and by the negative reputation gained by the Internal Troops during the Euromaidan protests.

Another force that was disbanded in 2014 in aftermath of Euromaidan was the special police force "Berkut". It was created in 1992 as a special tactical unit to combat organised crime, but with time it morphed into a secret police and riot control unit, with a strongly negative reputation for their systematic extreme brutality and torture, kidnappings and unjustified detainments, extrajudicial punishments, intimidation of protesters, activists and journalists, strong anti-Ukrainian sentiment and a whole range of illegal activities. There were multiple notorious instances of "Berkut" brutally dispersing peaceful protests or brutally battering football fans for minor wrongdoing while "guarding" football matches. After their dissolution, some of them defected to Russia and started working in the Russian law enforcement. Several of those who remained were put to trial.

Another aspect of reforming the law enforcement system is the deconsolidation of functions from the Ministry of Internal Affairs and the Security Service to other agencies, most of which were created from scratch, like SBI or ESBU. For example, corruption investigation was transferred from SSU to NABU, guarding courts from police to Court Security Service, economic crimes investigation from police and SSU to the ESBU. The intent of this is to lower the immoderate influence that MIA and SSU used to have and make the system more balanced by introducing more checks and balances.

=== Police reform ===
The most notable reform with the most publicity was the reform of the police force. Being inspired by the success of the police reform in Georgia, the Ukrainian government invited Eka Zguladze, the former deputy minister of internal affairs of Georgia, and Khatia Dekanoidze, former head of Georgian police academy, to implement the same reform in Ukraine by the same patterns (appointing both of them to equivalent positions in the Ukrainian government). In addition to them, David Sakvarelidze, the former deputy chief prosecutor of Georgia, was invited to reform the system of prosecutors in Ukraine.

In 2015 the National Police of Ukraine was established as a new organisation to supersede the militsiya as the primary law enforcement body in the country. The very first unit of the newly reformed police, Kyiv patrol police, took oath on 4 July 2015. Several years later, this date, 4 July, was established as the Police Day to be celebrated annually. The new police force was meant as a clean start, both in principles of work and in name. The word "militsiya" remained from the Soviet Union, where it became the term for the policing force, derived from militia, a nonprofessional paramilitary troop tasked with law enforcement in Soviet Union in the very beginning of its existence. Due to the movement of decommunization, very active in Ukraine at that time, there was a public consensus to get rid of Soviet word "militsiya" ("militia") and start using "politsiya" ("police") like the rest of the world.

It was decided to create a new patrol police from scratch, with foreign experts participating in the process of recruiting new officers, and foreign policemen participating in training them. Anybody could apply to become a patrol police officer, even without any prior law, law enforcement or military experience. The preceding patrol-post service and traffic inspection of militsiya were disbanded, all of their officers were fired. However, they could apply for the new patrol police on the same terms as anyone else, with additional integrity and anticorruption checks. As for the rest of militsiya, it was decided to transform it into a new police force, after meticulously examining each of its members. Several examination committees, consisting of civic activists and foreign experts, were established to check integrity and professionalism of militsiya members. Those who passed were allowed to join the new police force, those who did not were fired forever. Some functions were taken away from the police to be given to new separate law enforcement agencies. For example, court police and tax police were disbanded for the Court Security Service and the Economic Security Bureau of Ukraine, respectively, to take their place.

Also, some legal and organisational changes were made to ensure integrity of the new police force. For example, now the effectiveness of a police unit should be assessed by the level of trust from the local community, measured by polls, rather than by number of solved cases (it is written into the law, but so far is barely applied in practice), to eliminate such phenomenon as extracting a confession in a crime by brute force, or refusing to register a case if it seems unlikely to be solved. Also, the salaries in the new police force were established at a noticeably higher level than those in militsiya, due to the idea that many of the officers started to resort to bribery not so much due to their bad faith, but due to their need to make ends meet.

== Legislation ==
Law enforcement in Ukraine operates within a legal framework defined by the Constitution of Ukraine, national legislation and international obligations. Criminal Code of Ukraine, Code of Ukraine on Administrative Offenses, Criminal Procedure Code of Ukraine and Law on the operational and investigative activities are the most important pieces of the legal framework.

Also, each law enforcement agency has a law or a regulation dedicated to them, like the Law on the National Police or Regulations on the State Bureau of Investigation. Those laws and regulations, together with resolutions of the Cabinet of Ministers of Ukraine, orders of the Ministry of Internal Affairs and other bylaws, regulate how the law enforcement bodies work, what their powers and duties are.

The national legislature, Verkhovna Rada, and its dedicated Committee of the Verkhovna Rada on law enforcement, develop and amend laws concerning law enforcement, and also conduct parliamentary oversight over law enforcement bodies. Also, scopes of committees on legal policy, on anticorruption policy and on national security, defence and intelligence partly cover activities of law enforcement bodies.

== National Police ==
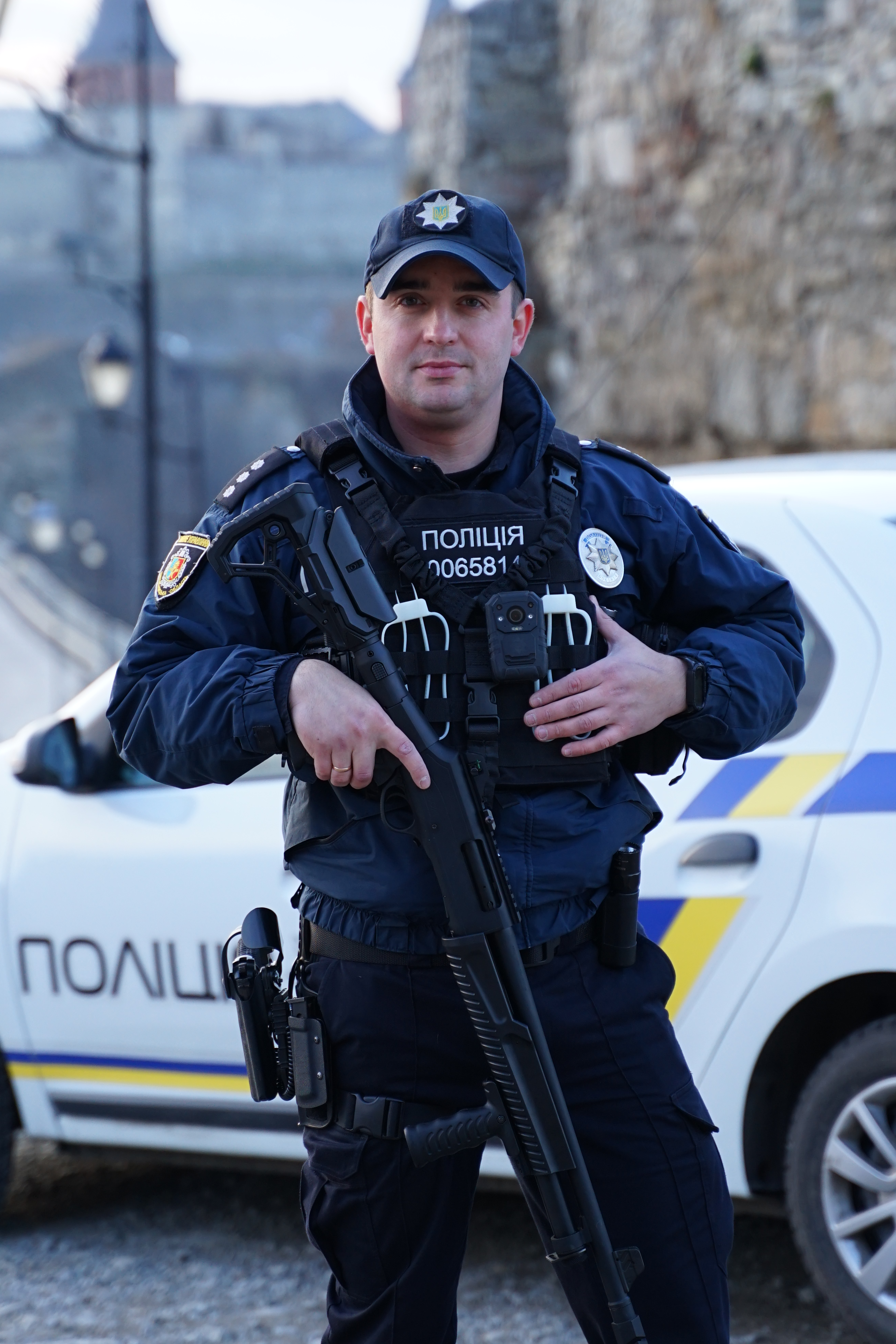
A policeman in his full gear in Kamianets-Podilskyi.

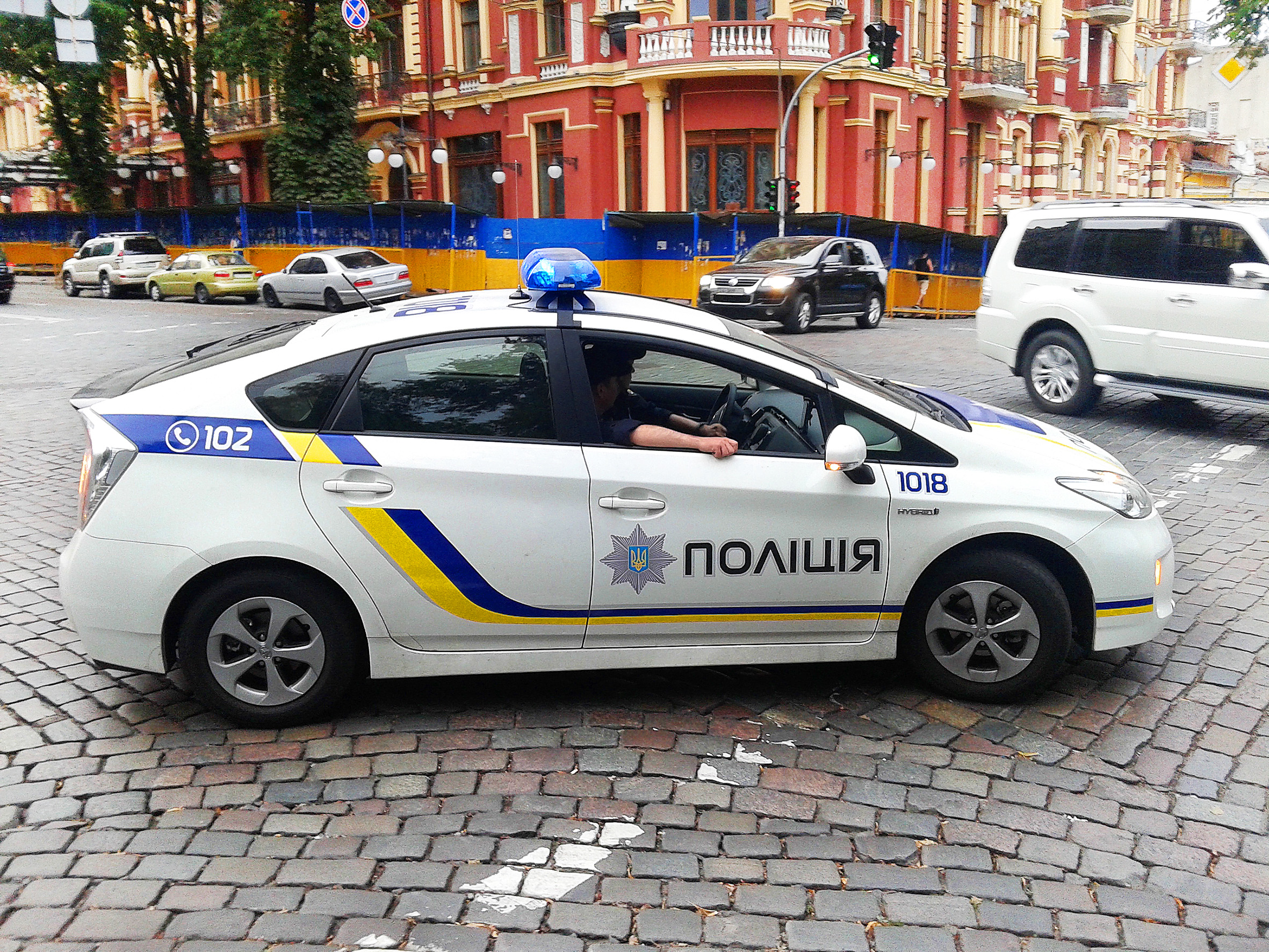
Police Toyota Prius patrolling the center of Kyiv.

The National Police of Ukraine is the biggest law enforcement body in Ukraine, both by number of personnel and by range of its tasks and powers. They carry out all law enforcement operations in the country that are not specifically assigned to other law enforcement bodies. They are often helped by the National Guard in carrying out their duties. The National Police is one of five organisations in the Ministry of Internal Affairs. (Note: Official website of the National Police of Ukraine) (Note: Laws of Ukraine. Verkhovna Rada No. 580-VIII: Law on the National Police. Adopted on 2015-07-02. (Ukrainian)) Police can be called by special emergency phone numbers 112 (joint for all emergency services) or 102 (police specifically).

The National Police of Ukraine has such specialised branches:

- Patrol Police is tasked with patrolling the streets in settlements, patrolling highways, enforcing traffic rules and registering traffic accidents, responding to emergency calls. They are the most visible part of the police and the law enforcement in general, people may see them on a daily basis, while rarely encountering policemen of other branches or other law enforcement officers. They usually patrol on cars or on foot, but there are also bicycle, motorcycle, mounted and boat patrols.
  - TOR ("Tactical operative reaction") is a special unit of patrol police dedicated to ensuring public safety during mass events and protests (including physically isolating opposing camps of protesters or fans of opposing football teams from each other), riot control, assisting patrol police officers in dangerous situations (e.g. mass fights). When they are not engaged in those specialised activities, they work as usual patrol officers.
- Criminal Police is an investigative branch tasked with investigating serious crimes, such as murders, violent crimes, human trafficking, drug trafficking, grand theft, and so on.
  - Cyberpolice is a unit responsible for dealing with all sorts of crime committed on the internet, from online bullying to illegally selling weapons through the internet (see § Cybercrime).
- KORD ("Rapid Operational Response Unit") is a special tactical unit whose purpose is to deal with a wide range of dangerous situations, that usual police officers can not handle. This includes apprehension of dangerous and well-armed criminals, hostage rescue, supporting operations of other units when armed resistance is expected.
- Security Police is a unit which provides paid security services: reacting to alarms going off or panic buttons being pressed (arriving to the scene to arrest a burglar, trespasser or troublemaker), guarding objects, bodyguarding individuals, guarding and escorting valuable items, including cash-in-transit, maintaining order at events, etc. It is the only unit of law enforcement which operates for profit.
- "Rage" Brigade and other consolidated brigades are combat units partiсipating in the warfare together with the Armed Forces and other military formations. They were created with intent to give police officers an opportunity to participate in protecting their country from an invasion, bypassing bureaucratic procedures of transferring from the National Police to the Armed Forces (and then back), retaining their police rank (contrary to becoming just a private in the army) and keeping their police career legally uninterrupted.

Apart from those specialised branches, the police force is subdivided into territorial divisions. There are 26 regional directorates, one for each region of Ukraine (except Crimea and Sevastopol, which have a joint one). Those directorates are subdivided further into district departments, each of which operates one or more police stations. Those police stations usually have such units:

- Detectives and operatives who work on investigating crimes that were committed in the area overseen by the police station.
- Precinct officers ("Дільничні"). Each of them is assigned a certain piece of territory, their "precinct", which takes up a neighbourhood or a couple of them in cities, or a village or a couple of them in rural areas, where they conduct primary enforcement and prevention. Most of their work consists of dealing with minor wrongdoings, settling conflicts between neighbours, helping people recently released from prison to reintegrate, conducting oversight over problematic families (e.g. those which have problems with domestic violence), over people of violent behaviour or with criminal record, over people who have problems with alcohol. However, in rural areas, in absence of other police officers, they often do much more work, which is typically done by other units.
- Juvenile police has to prevent and deal with situations and offences that harm children, their rights, safety and wellbeing, but also deal with offences committed by them. That includes dealing with domestic violence, reckless parenting, forced labour, school bullying, sexual crimes, as well as working with troubled teens, trying to prevent them from being dragged into crime or drug abuse. Juvenile police also provides psychological, social and other help to children who became a victim of a crime or got into a difficult life situation, accompanies them when they have to deal with other authorities.

The National Police operates three police academies: in Kyiv, in Rivne and in Kryvyi Rih.

In Kyiv and other big cities of Ukraine there is "dialogue police" (officially "department of preventive communication") which facilitates peace and order during mass events, such as protests, demonstrations, marches, political meetings, sports games, concerts or religious gatherings. Their task is to resolve all conflicts that may occur, peacefully through communication, prevent and stop violations of the law by verbal methods, before force is applied. They cooperate with event organisers and other authorities to make sure the event goes as peacefully as possible. This is especially valuable during events having two or more opposing sides: two camps of protesters with opposing positions, fans of rival football teams, gay prides confronted by right-wing and religious activists, etc. For most police officers who operate as dialogue police, it is a side job and they do something else full-time. The creation of dialogue police was inspired by the success of a similar concept working in Czechia, also taking similar units in Sweden and Denmark as a blueprint.

Unlike many other countries, in Ukraine there is no such organisation as "transport police". Law enforcement duties on transport infrastructure are carried out by the National Police, often helped by the National Guard and municipal forces. Some major transport infrastructure objects have police units dedicated to them specifically, for example Kyiv police has special departments for Kyiv Metro and for Kyiv-Pasazhyrskyi railway station, and Kyiv Oblast police likewise for Boryspil International Airport. The national railway operator, JSC Ukrainian Railways (UZ), unlike those in many other European countries, does not have its own police force. Criminal investigations on the railways are carried out by the National Police, but Ukrainian Railways has a Railway Security Service, which serves as an umbrella term for a system of units responsible for the protection of cargo, railway infrastructure facilities, and other railway assets. These units detain cargo thieves, carry out fire prevention measures, participate in extinguishing fires on railway facilities and transport, and conduct internal investigations of such incidents, maintaining records of all fires. They also ensure compliance with passenger transportation regulations and rules of conduct for peoples using railway transport. (Note: Laws of Ukraine. Cabinet of Ministers of Ukraine No. 7-94-п: Regulations on the paramilitary security force of the JSC "Ukrainian Railways". Adopted on 1994-01-11. (Ukrainian))

== Security Service ==
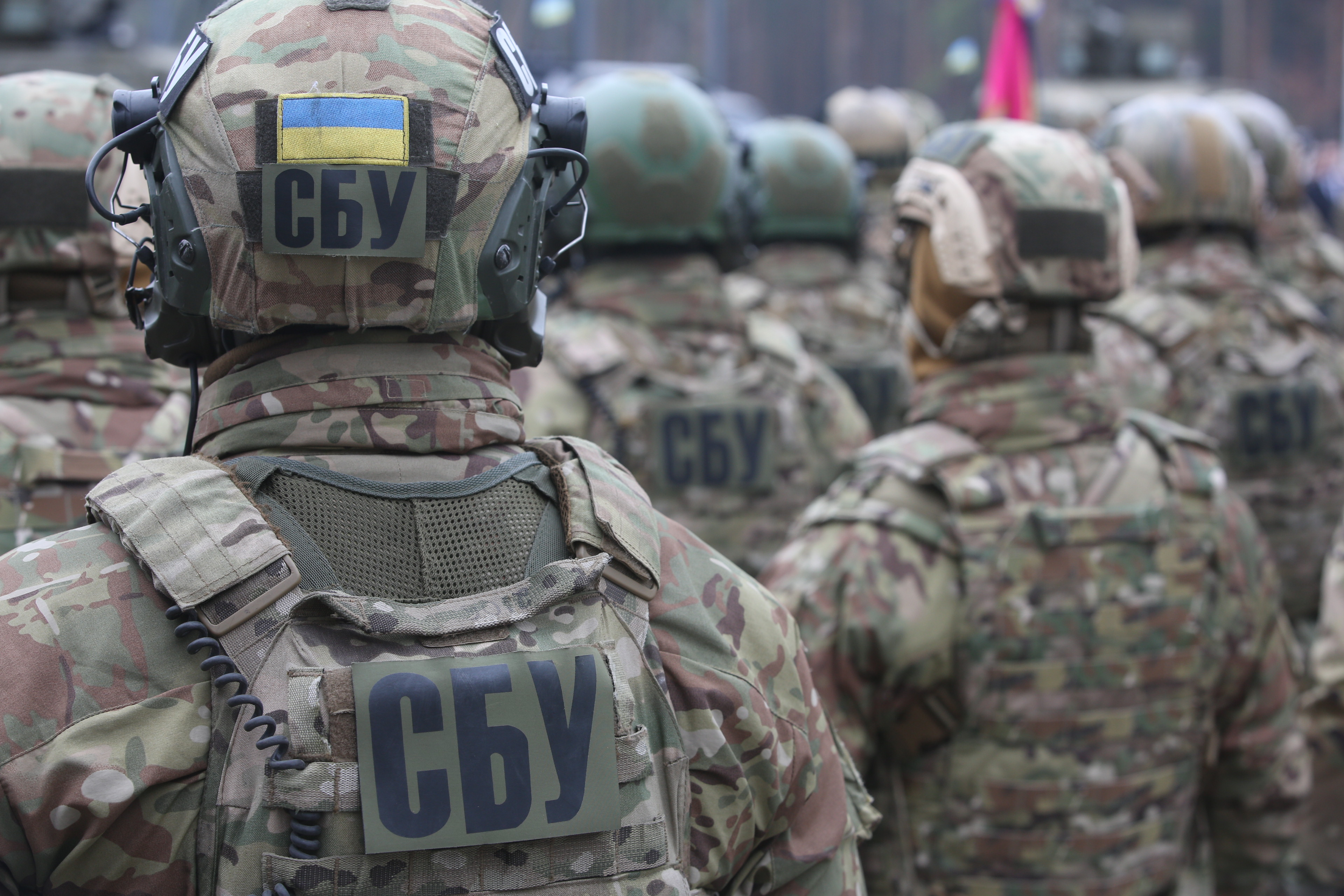
Officers of the special tactical force of the Security Service of Ukraine.

The Security Service of Ukraine (SSU, a.k.a. SBU if abbreviated from Ukrainian) is an independent law enforcement agency and domestic intelligence agency, the biggest and most powerful law enforcement body not under the MIA, which is responsible for national security, constitutional order, counter-intelligence, anti-terrorism and fighting organized crime of all kinds (including organised cybercrime, human trafficking, weapons and drugs trafficking). (Note: Official website of the Security Service of Ukraine) (Note: Laws of Ukraine. Verkhovna Rada No. 2229-XII: Law on the Security Service of Ukraine. Adopted on 1992-03-25. (Ukrainian)) It is also an important part of the defence forces of Ukraine, tasked with covert intelligence, rescue and sabotage operations on the occupied territories of Ukraine and on the Russian territory, as well as counter-espionage. Earlier, this agency had even more powers and jurisdictions (including investigation of corruption and financial crimes, and even doing foreign intelligence), which caused criticism pointing out that this agency was way too powerful and it was abusing its powers. But due to the ongoing restructuring and reform, some of its powers and jurisdictions were transferred to other agencies (particularly, to the NABU and ESBU). It was created in 1991 to take place of the KGB of Ukrainian SSR.

It has such notable subordinate units:

- Anti-Terrorist Center is a unit that monitors for terrorism threats around the clock, coordinates the activity of different law enforcement agencies and their subdivisions in the field of counterterrorism. It is tasked with the prevention and termination of terrorist acts against state officials, objects of critical infrastructure and objects of increased danger, as well as acts that threaten life and health of a significant number of people. It also coordinates counterterrorism activities of Ukrainian law enforcement agencies with similar activities of foreign and international law enforcement, informs population on the incoming terrorist threats when needed. There is the main center in Kyiv and local centers in each region. (Note: Page of the Anti-Terrorist Center on the official website of the Security Service of Ukraine) (Note: Laws of Ukraine. President of Ukraine No. 379/99: Decree of the President of Ukraine on the Anti-Terrorist Center and its coordination groups at the regional offices of the Security Service of Ukraine. Adopted on 1999-04-14. (Ukrainian))
- Joint coordination center for prisoners of war and illegally detained people is a unit which coordinates the activity of different government institutions in the field of locating, keeping track of and facilitating the return of Ukrainian combatants who were taken as prisoners of war by the enemy, as well as Ukrainian civilians (especially children) who were detained or forcefully deportated by the enemy. It also facilitates the return of bodies of Ukrainian citizens, who died as a result of Russian aggression and those bodies are located on the enemy-controlled territories. (Note: Page of the Joint coordination center for POWs and illegally detained people on the official website of the Security Service of Ukraine) (Note: Laws of Ukraine. Security Service of Ukraine No. z0413-19: Regulations on the Joint coordination center for prisoners of war and illegally detained people. Adopted on 2019-04-08. (Ukrainian))
- Alpha is an elite special operations team, which is used for such high-risk tasks as hostage rescue, apprehension or elimination of very dangerous and well-armed criminals, apprehension of members of organised crime or enemy spy networks, assault on well-fortified or hard to reach premises, protection of witnesses and judges during dangerous trials, etc. At the time of Russian invasion it is also used as an elite combat unit for direct action, sensitive and black operations, special reconnaissance, high-value targets capture or elimination and so on.

The Security Service of Ukraine is often praised as a military, special operations and intelligence force for its effectiveness in combat and numerous successful operations, such as assassinations of separatists leaders and Russian generals, blowing up the Crimean bridge, and especially operation "Spiderweb", which many experts and media described with such words as "unprecendented" or "audacious".

On the other hand, it is often criticised as a law enforcement agency. It was accused of persecuting journalists and activists, making arbitrary detentions, acting in personal political interests of the president or other political figures, obstructing the work of other law enforcement bodies, exceeding authority, investigating cases not in their jurisdiction, etc. For example, there was a big scandal in 2024 when it was discovered that the Security Service had been illegally surveilling journalists of a prominent investigative journalism media "Bihus.Info". It was found out that a warrant for such actions was never issued, and the SSU itself failed to reasonably explain what they were investigating, leading to assumptions that this surveillance was aimed at finding out what "Bihus.Info" was working on at the moment.

== Ministry of Internal Affairs ==
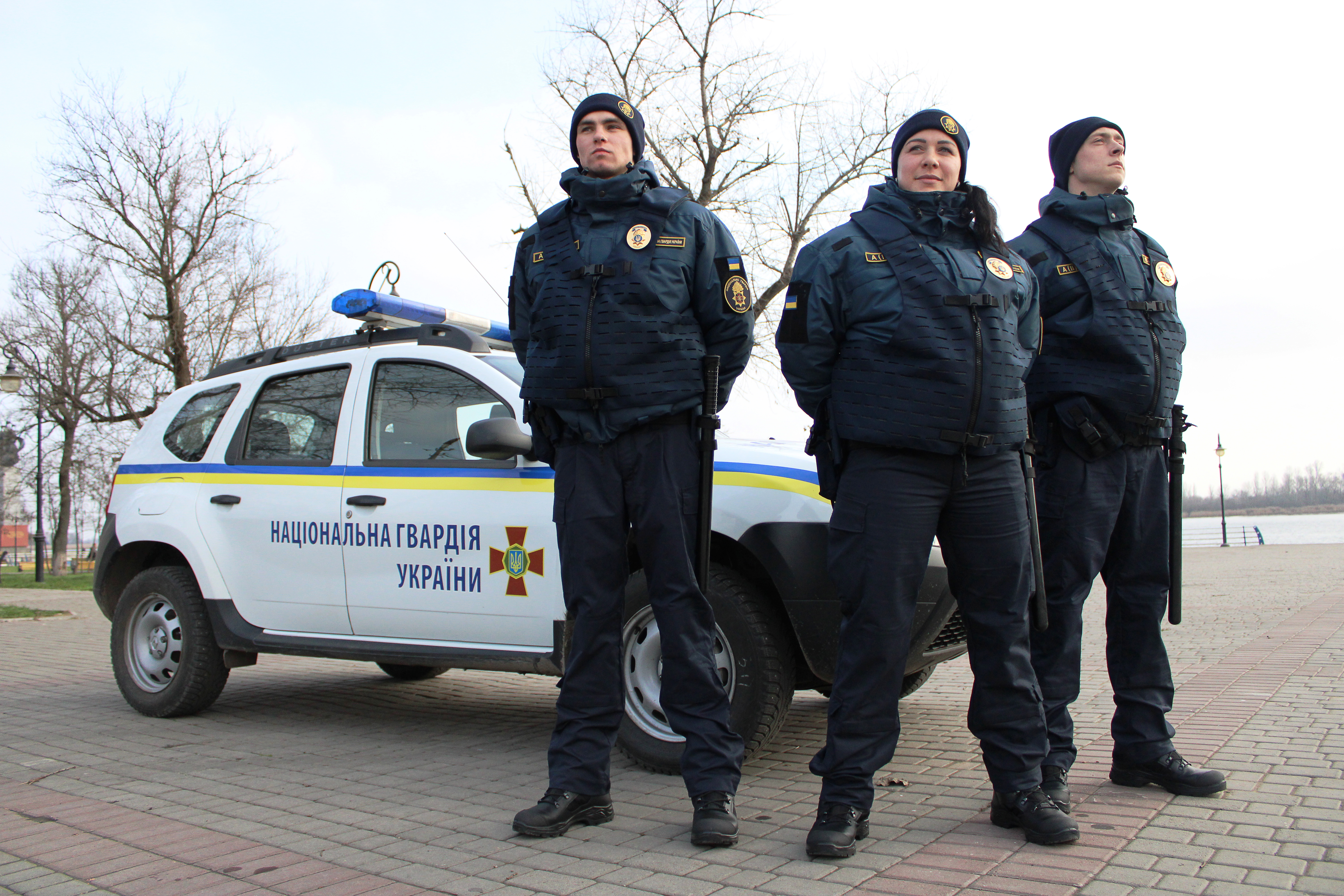
National Guard of Ukraine officers and their Renault Duster service car.

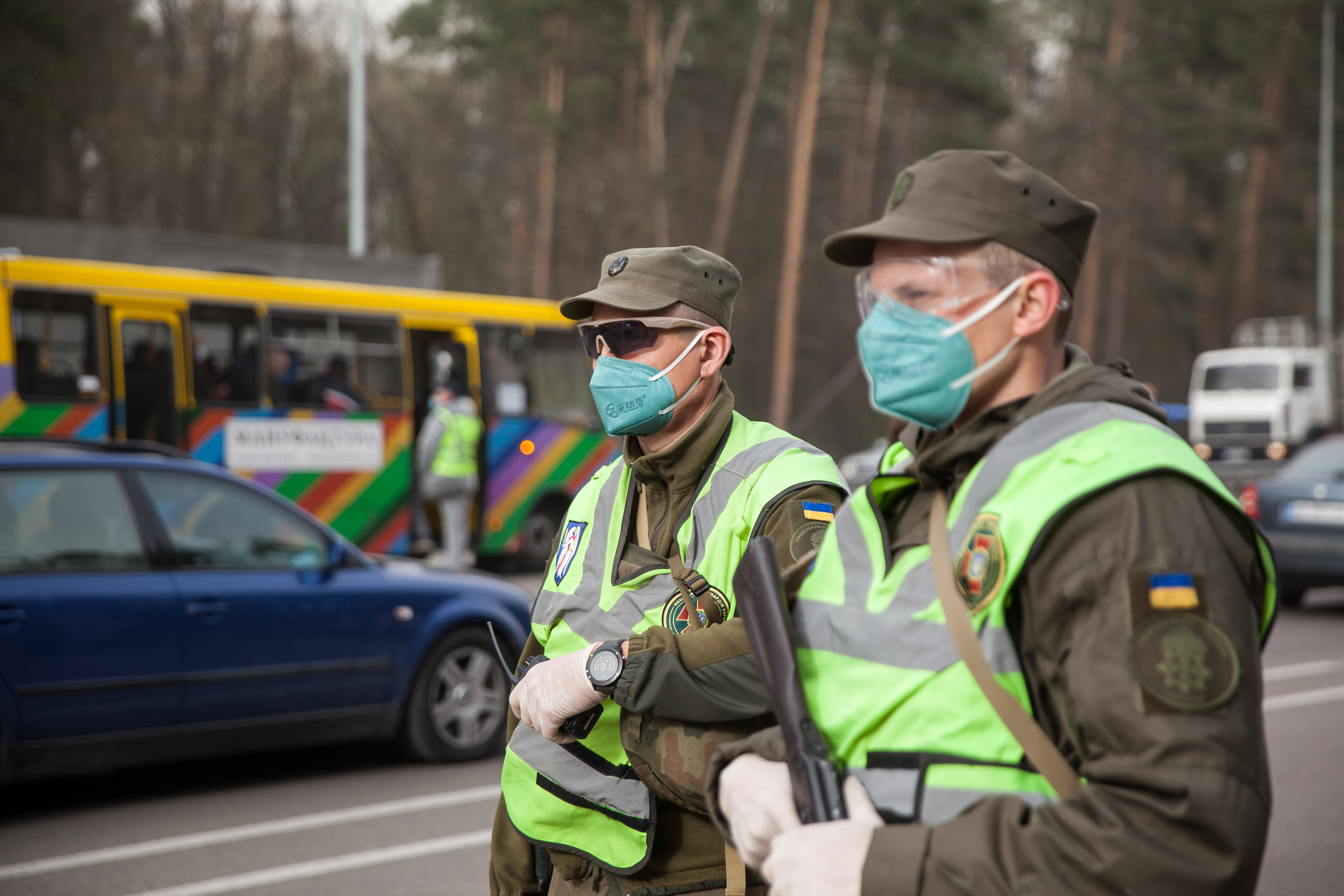
National guard officers at a checkpoint during COVID-19.

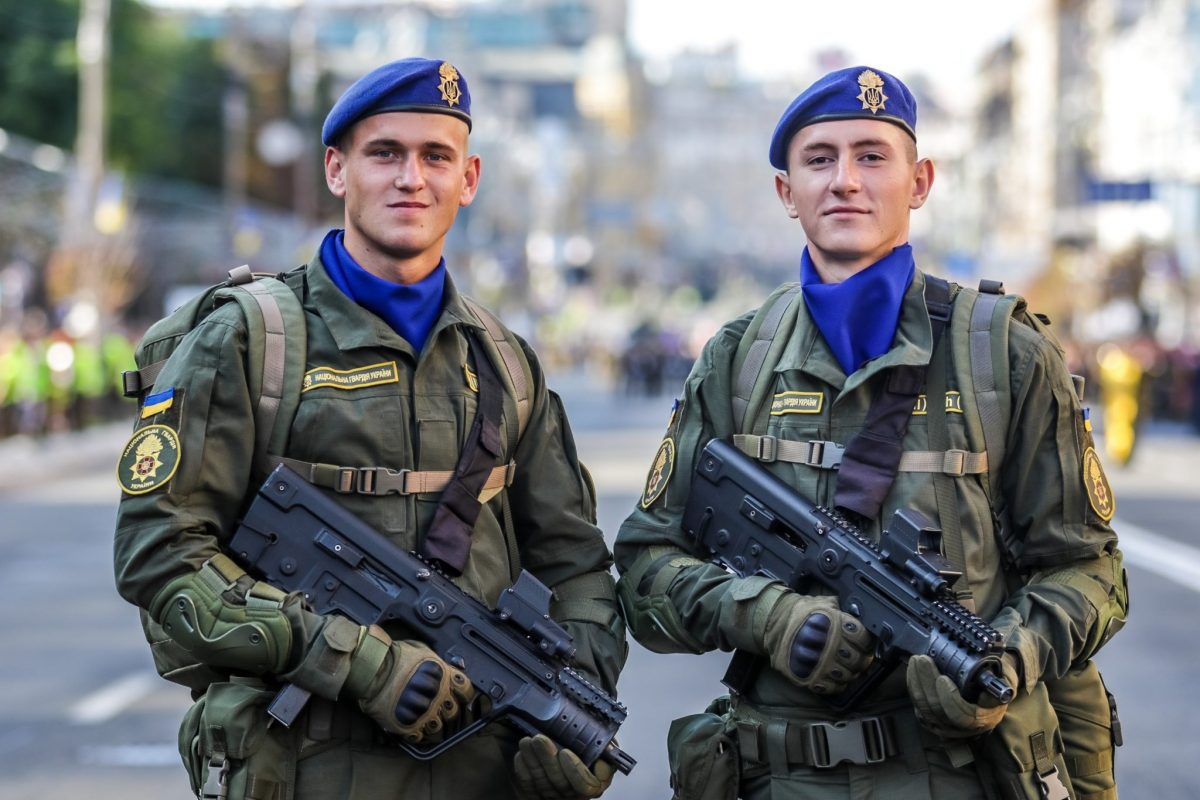
Two members of the National Guard of Ukraine in their parade uniforms.

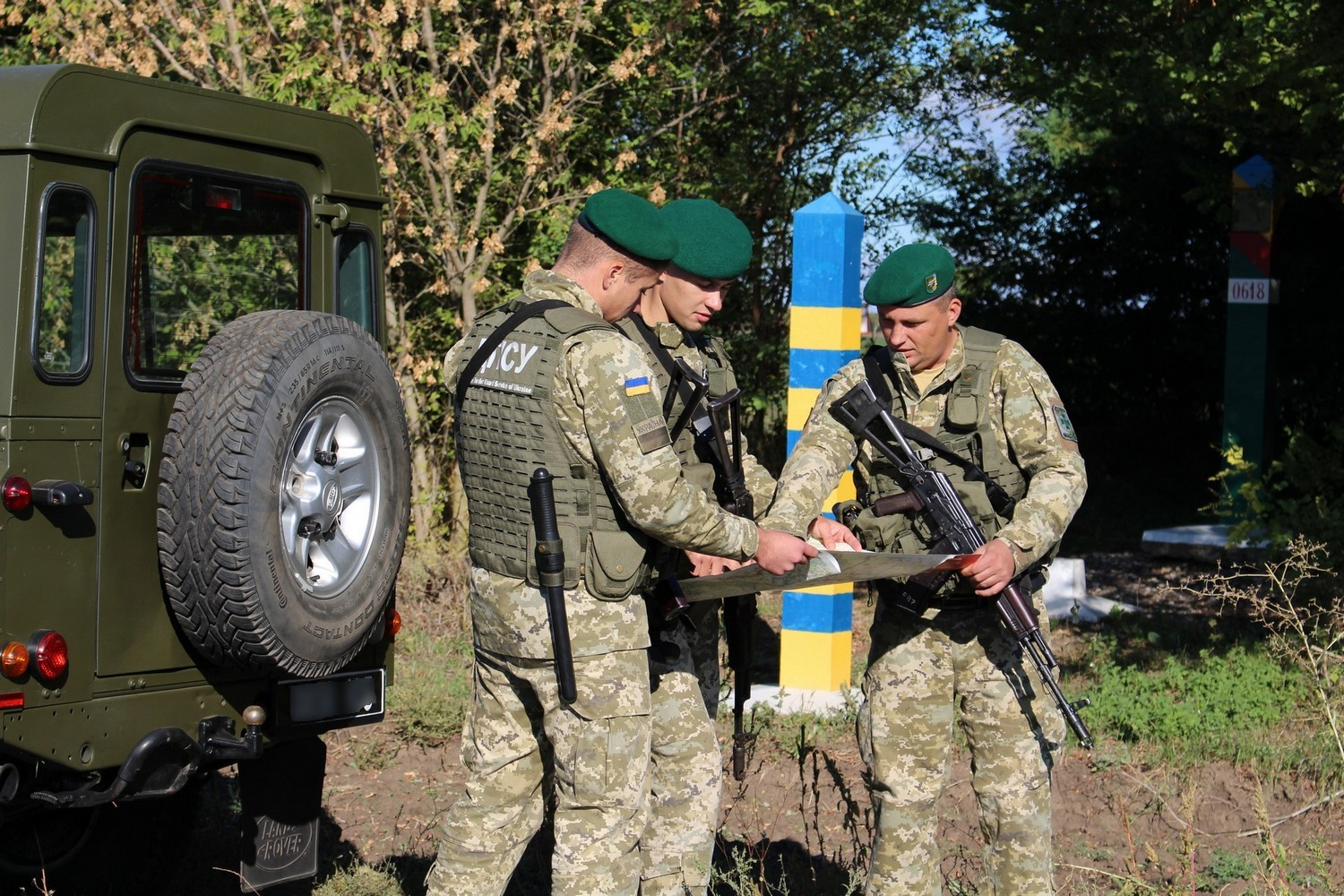
Ukrainian border guard field operatives patrolling the border with Moldova.

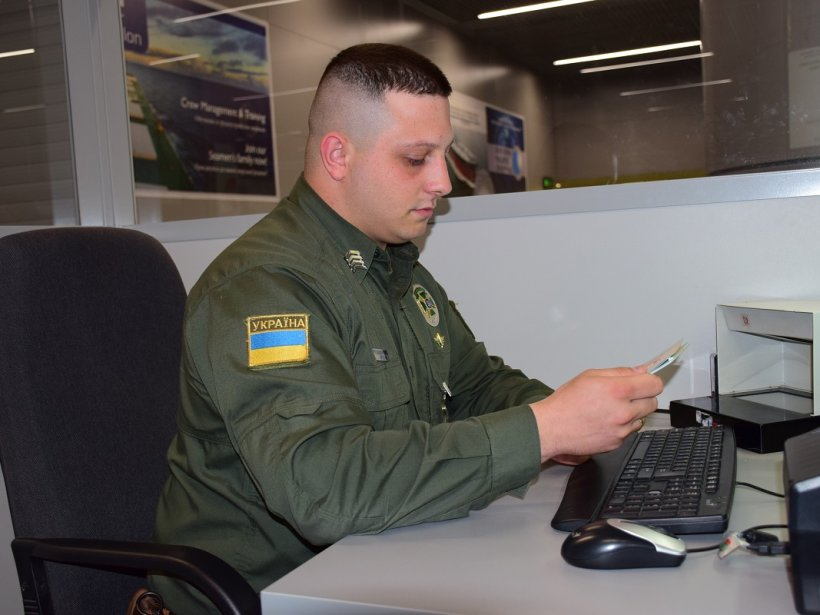
Ukrainian border guard officer checking documents at the Kharkiv International Airport.

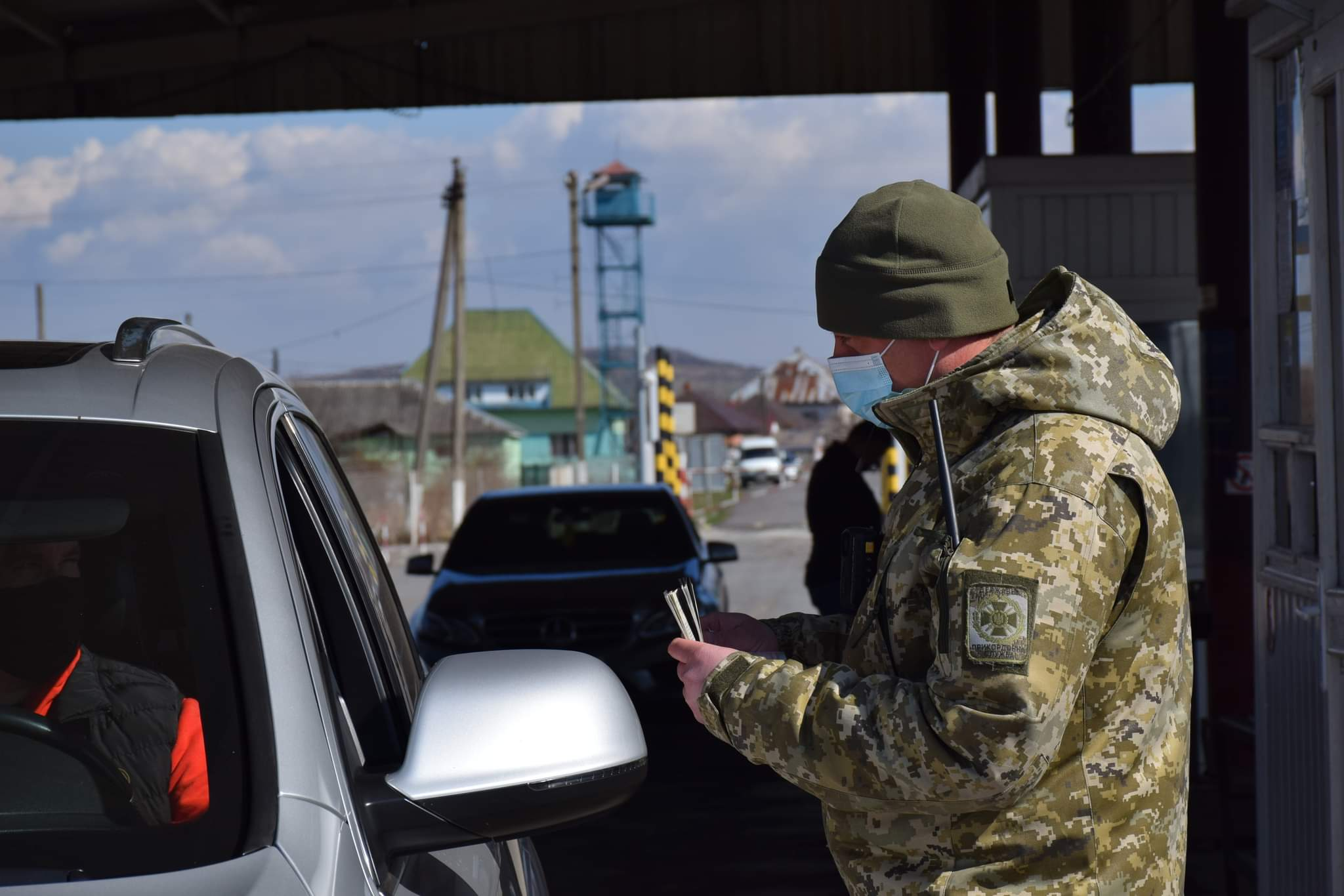
Ukrainian border guard checks documents at the border with Hungary.

Apart from the police force, the Ministry of Internal Affairs of Ukraine (MIA) consists of four other bodies:

- National Guard of Ukraine (NGU, both ukr. and eng.) is the national gendarmerie, a military formation under the MIA which has both defence and law enforcement duties. It has a wide range of functions, such as guarding government facilities and important infrastructure objects, guarding embassies and other diplomatic facilities, escorting prisoners and detainees, operating checkpoints, maintaining order and public safety in areas close to a combat zone, etc. It often assists other law enforcement bodies in carrying out their duties, for example national guards may be seen patrolling the streets together with police, guarding the border together with border guards or guarding court buildings together with court security. It also helps police to maintain public safety during mass events such as protests, political summits, concerts or football games. Apart from that, the National Guard, in cooperation with the Armed Forces of Ukraine, takes part in defending the country from the military aggression. (Note: Official website of the National Guard of Ukraine) (Note: Laws of Ukraine. Verkhovna Rada No. 876-VII: Law on the National Guard of Ukraine. Adopted on 2014-03-13. (Ukrainian)) Reestablished in 2014 (already existed till 2000) to replace the Internal Troops of Ukraine.
- State Border Guard Service of Ukraine (SBGSU, ukr. DPSU) is a law enforcement agency and a military formation responsible for ensuring integrity of the state border, counteracting contraband and illegal migration through the border, exercising migration and customs control at land border crossings (both railway and automobile), sea ports and international airports. It guards 1355 km of maritime border and approximately 5600 kilometers of land border, including two thousand kilometers of border with Russia and another thousand kilometers with its allied Belarus. This service is an important part of the defence forces, taking part in the warfare against the invading forces. (Note: Official website of the State Border Guard Service of Ukraine) (Note: Laws of Ukraine. Verkhovna Rada No. 661-IV: Law on the State Border Guard Service of Ukraine. Adopted on 2003-04-03. (Ukrainian)) Created in 2003 to replace the Border Troops of Ukraine.
  - Ukrainian Sea Guard is a subdivision of the State Border Guard Service which is responsible for guarding the maritime border of Ukraine in Black Sea, Azov Sea, Danube River and other water bodies, preventing contraband and illegal migration through the sea, conducting search and rescue operations at the sea, counteracting enemy military provocations against Ukraine at sea.
- State Migration Service of Ukraine (SMSU, ukr. DMS) is responsible for enforcing citizenship and migrational policy, counteracting illegal immigration, managing immigrants and refugees, issuing passports and residence permits, etc. (Note: Official website of the State Migration Service of Ukraine) (Note: Laws of Ukraine. Cabinet of Ministers of Ukraine No. 360-2014-п: Regulations on the State Migration Service of Ukraine. Adopted on 2014-08-20. (Ukrainian))
- State Emergency Service of Ukraine (SESU, ukr. DSNS) is a body responsible for fire and rescue operations. Despite being a part of the MIA, it is not a law enforcement agency, however it has fire inspectors who enforce fire safety laws and regulations. Before 2012 it was a separate ministry.

The ministry also operates a network of service centers which organise driving exams and issue driver licenses, register vehicles and issue numberplates, provide other administrative services.

== Ministry of Justice ==
Some of the departments and subordinate agencies of the Ministry of Justice of Ukraine have law enforcement functions:

- Department of the sanctions policy is responsible for implementing the national sanctions policy, enforcing sanctions imposed by the National Security and Defense Council of Ukraine on organisations and persons, both domestic and foreign, and on foreign governments, finding and confiscating assets of entities on which the sanctions are imposed, assessing the effectiveness of those sanction and putting forward propositions on how to improve them. (Note: Page of the Department of the sanctions policy on the official website of the Ministry of Justice) (Note: Laws of Ukraine. Verkhovna Rada No. 1644-VII: Law on sanctions. Adopted on 2014-08-14. (Ukrainian))
- Office for counteracting corporate raids is a ministry department that counteracts cases of maliciously acquiring ownership (stealing) over property of corporate entities by exploiting loopholes in the law or systemic defects of the government institutions, or by utilising malicious court orders or state registers transactions.
- Department of the State Executive Service is responsible for enforcement of decisions of courts and other authorities, whose decisions are mandatory, making sure that those decisions are obeyed on time, efficiently, and to the full extent. Earlier it was an autonomous agency, but it was turned into a ministry department.
- State Penitentiary Service of Ukraine is tasked with execution of criminal sentences, operating the system of penitentiary, correctional and detention facilities, maintaining order in them.

== Anticorruption ==
There is a separate law enforcement and judiciary system dedicated specifically to counter corruption crimes (including illicit enrichment), with its own intelligence, operatives, detectives, prosecutors and judges. Parliamentary oversight over this system is conducted by the Committee of the Verkhovna Rada on anticorruption policy. It consists of such bodies:

- National Agency on Corruption Prevention (NACP, ukr. NAZK) is responsible for shaping and implementing anti-corruption policy. Its main focus is on preventing corruption and exercising corruption monitoring. It operates the Unified State Register of Declarations. Once a year, all government servants in positions with high corruption risk and all top and middle-level government officials file declarations into this register, where they specify their income and property. The agency must collect those declarations, verify their veracity and make them public for the society and media. Every declaration is checked, and if any anomalies, discrepancies or lies are found in it, it is referred to the NABU for investigation. The agency also monitors the way of life of the abovementioned group of people at all times to see if it matches their official income. Other tasks of this agency include running the register of people caught on corruption, monitoring government officials for conflicts of interest, monitoring financial activities of political parties for malicious transactions (e.g. violations of donations rules), analysing draft laws for corruption risks and delivering reports of the identified risks to the lawmakers, collecting statistics and making research about corruption in Ukraine, etc. (Note: Official website of the National Agency on Corruption Prevention) (Note: Laws of Ukraine. Verkhovna Rada No. 1700-VII: Law on the corruption prevention. Adopted on 2014-08-20. (Ukrainian))
- Asset recovery and management agency (ARMA, both ukr. and eng.) is tasked with locating and then using legal procedures to confiscate in favor of the state all assets which were acquired by means of corruption or some other crimes (such as money laundering). Those assets can have different forms: real estate, corporate rights, bank accounts, works of art, vessels and vehicles, etc. When such assets are located in or are under jurisdiction of a foreign state, the agency has to work with the relevant authorities of this state to recover those assets. And vice versa, it helps foreign authorities when they need to recover assets which are under the Ukrainian jurisdiction. The agency, after confiscating some assets, may organize an auction to sell them and send revenue to the state budget, or choose to leave them as state property. (Note: Official website of the Asset recovery and management agency) (Note: Laws of Ukraine. Verkhovna Rada No. 772-VIII: Law on the National agency of Ukraine on identification, search and management of assets, acquired by corruptional or other crimes. Adopted on 2015-11-10. (Ukrainian))
- National Anti-Corruption Bureau of Ukraine (NABU, both ukr. and eng.) is a law enforcement agency which investigates crimes related to corruption, committed by high-ranking officials or concerning very valuable assets or large amounts of money (otherwise, they are investigated by police or other bodies). Those crimes are bribery, abuse of power, usage of authority for personal benefit, illicit enrichment, declaring false information in a declaration or failing to file it at all, misuse of budget funds, illegally acquiring ownership over (stealing) government property, money laundering, etc. Its duties also include anticorruption background checks of candidates for high government positions, working with and providing protection to corruption whistleblowers. (Note: Official website of the National Anti-Corruption Bureau) (Note: Laws of Ukraine. Verkhovna Rada No. 1698-VII: Law on the National Anti-Corruption Bureau. Adopted on 2014-10-14. (Ukrainian))
- Specialized Anti-Corruption Prosecutor's Office (SAPO, ukr. SAP) is an autonomous subdivision of the Office of the Prosecutor General of Ukraine which has functions of representing corruption cases, investigated by the NABU, in courts, representing the state in court cases related to corruption, indicting suspects with criminal corruption charges, supporting and overseeing NABU investigations.
- High Anti-Corruption Court of Ukraine (HACC, ukr. VAKS) is a specialised court of first and appeal instances, that hears criminal corruption cases against indicted individuals, investigated by the NABU. This court has its own appellate chamber, where the decisions of this court can be appealed. In the Ukrainian judicial system only the Supreme Court of Ukraine is higher in hierarchy than this court.

Also, in Ukraine there is a wide network of investigative journalism media, dedicated specifically to investigating corruption. The most popular of them are "Skhemy" (subsidiary of RFE/RL) and "Bihus.Info". Quite often their journalistic investigations give start to official criminal investigations. Apart from them, a large network of NGOs specialising in anticorruption, for example Anti-Corruption Action Center, is present as well.

== Other law enforcement bodies ==
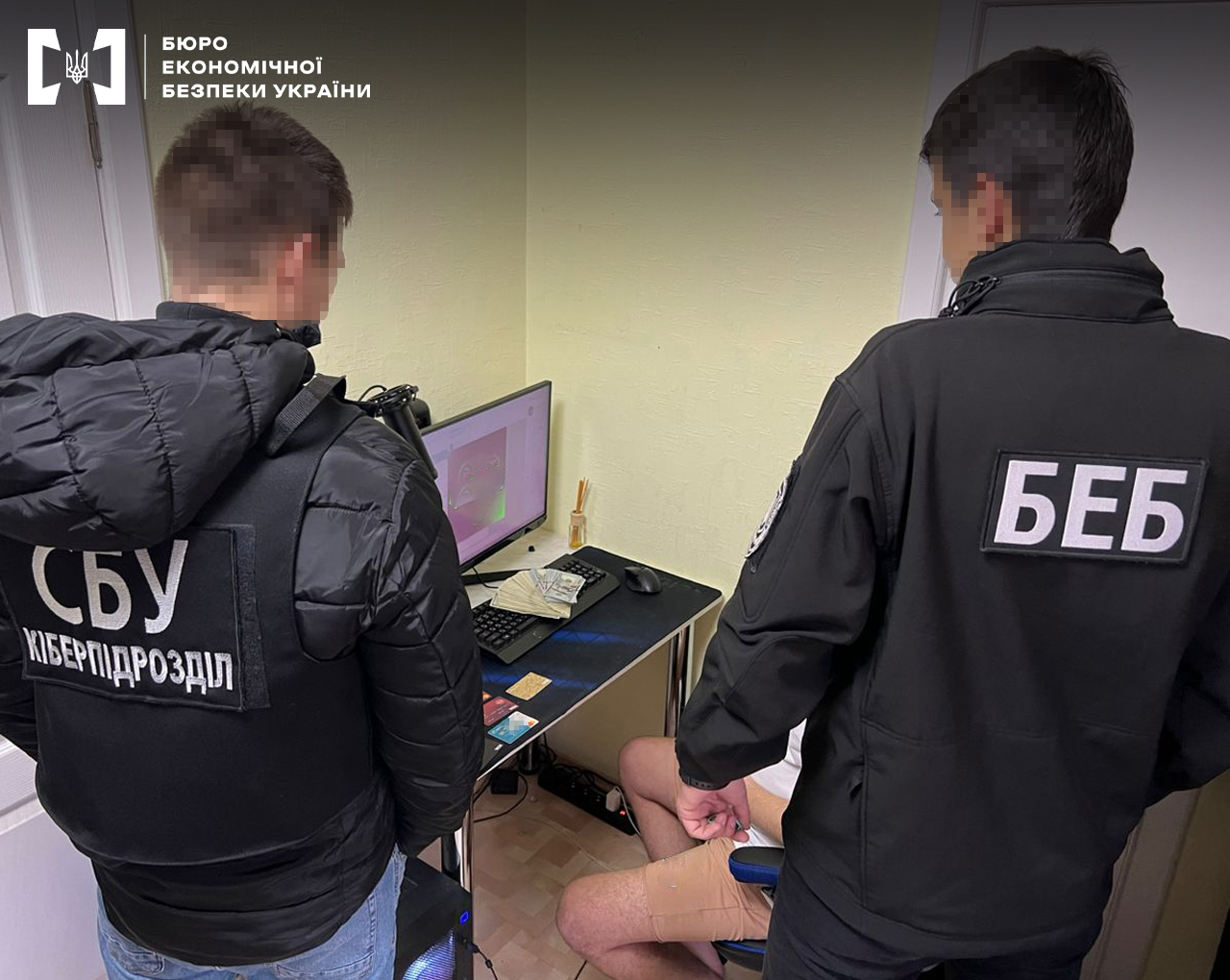
Economic Security Bureau and Security Service law enforcement officers during a raid on an illegal enterprise, investigating unlicensed banking operations.

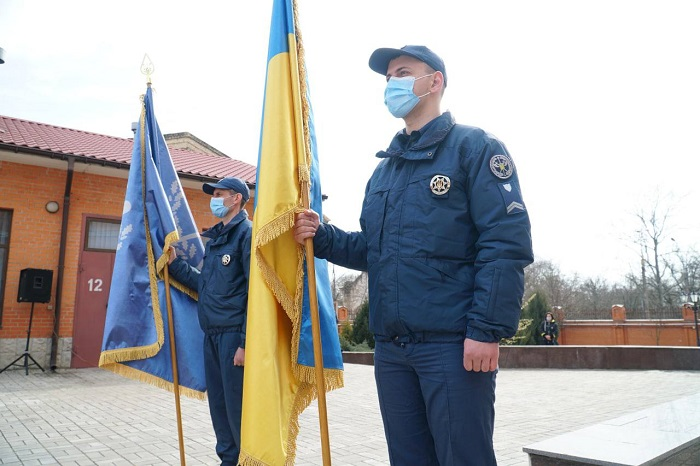
Officers of the Court Security Service of Ukraine taking oath in Kherson.

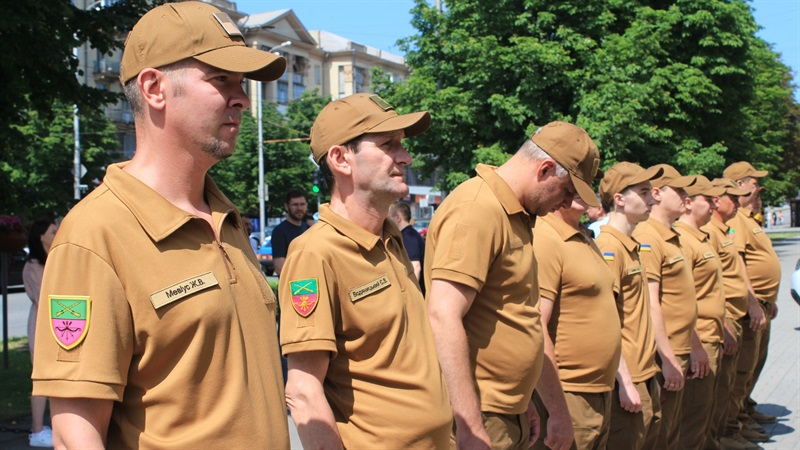
Members of the Municipal Guard of Zaporizhzhia. Such municipal forces usually use uniforms of brownish-yellow or greenish-brown colors to make them clearly distinct from police officers or members of other conventional law enforcement bodies.

- State Bureau of Investigation (SBI, ukr. DBR) is an independent agency, investigating crimes and misdemeanors committed by other law enforcement officers, judges and high-ranking officials, as well as by military servicemen. It acts as some sort of internal investigations body for all other law enforcement and military organisations. For example, it investigates all cases of serious crimes, such as murder or rape, committed by aforementioned group of people, regardless of whether they were committed on or off duty. It also often investigates treason cases when they are committed by aforementioned group of people (here it overlaps with the Security Service jurisdiction). Most of the bureau investigations are related to malfeasance and abuse of power, minor corruption (while grand corruption falls under NABU jurisdiction) and crimes committed while on duty, for example related to police brutality or racketeering. It also functions as an investigative body for the military, investigating such cases as deserting or refusing to obey an order. (Note: Official website of the State Bureau of Investigation) (Note: Laws of Ukraine. Verkhovna Rada No. 794-VIII: Law on the State Bureau of Investigation. Adopted on 2015-11-12. (Ukrainian)) Before creation of this agency, most of the crimes it investigates now were investigated by the Office of the Prosecutor General, and some by the Security Service.
- Economic Security Bureau (ESBU, ukr. BEB) is an agency responsible for preventing, discovering and investigating financial and economic crimes, such as tax evasion, counterfeiting money, organising illegal gambling, financial and banking fraud, trademark misuse, market manipulation, misuse of government funds, etc. It also carries out analytical functions: collecting and analyzing data about economic and financial crimes to find the best ways to prevent and to stop them, identifying and assessing risks for the economy of Ukraine, developing strategies to address those risks. (Note: Official website of the Bureau of Economic Security of Ukraine) It was created in 2021 to consolidate in one agency economic and financial law enforcement functions, which before that were spread across multiple agencies, creating jurisdiction overlaps and excessive pressure on businesses. To ensure that the agency remains independent, its chief is appointed by the commission of six people, three of whom are appointed by the international organisations and three by the Ukrainian government. (Note: Laws of Ukraine. Verkhovna Rada No. 1150-IX: Law on the State Bureau of Economic Security of Ukraine. Adopted on 2021-01-28. (Ukrainian))
- State Security Administration (SSA, ukr. UDO) is an independent agency which provides personal security to the top government officials and their families (including the President of Ukraine), both in Ukraine and during their official visits abroad, and guards buildings of the top government bodies (like Verkhovna Rada building or Cabinet of Ministers building). (Note: Official website of the State Security Administration) (Note: Laws of Ukraine. Verkhovna Rada No. 160/98-ВР: Law on the state protection of state authorities and officials of Ukraine. Adopted on 1998-03-04. (Ukrainian))
- Court Security Service (CSS, ukr. SSO) is a body subordinate to the judiciary branch of the government, tasked with guarding court facilities, maintaining order during court proceedings, reacting to instances of court contempt and providing personal security to judges, court employees and participants of court cases. (Note: Official website of the Court Security Service) (Note: Laws of Ukraine. High Council of Justice No. v1051910-19: Regulations on the Court Security Service. Adopted on 2019-04-04. (Ukrainian)) The service is largely assisted by the National Guard in carrying out its duties. Created in 2019, before that those duties were carried out by the police, which had a dedicated unit for this purpose.
- Military Service of Law Enforcement (MSLE, ukr. VSP) is the national military police force tasked with maintaining law, order and discipline in the Armed Forces of Ukraine, preventing, stopping and punishing (but not investigating) crimes and misdemeanors in the Armed Forces. (Note: Laws of Ukraine. Verkhovna Rada No. 3099-III: Law on the Military Service of Law Enforcement in the Armed Forces of Ukraine. Adopted on 2002-03-07. (Ukrainian)) Its duties include searching for deserters, combating alcoholism among servicemen, ensuring traffic safety for military vehicles, protecting military property from theft, patrolling military installations to maintain order and to prevent acts of sabotage or terrorism, operating military prisons to house convicted servicemen. At the times of war this service is also tasked with handling prisoners of war, detecting and counteracting enemy sabotage squads and enforcing curfews at the garrisons. Inside it functions the Military inspection of traffic safety, which escorts military cargo on public roads, clearing the way for them when needed, and also regulates traffic in military installations. Members of the Military Service of Law Enforcement wear the same uniform as the rest of the Armed Forces, however they are identifiable by their blue brassards with yellow letters "ВСП" (abbreviation of the agency title in Ukrainian).
- Fish patrol of the State agency of fisheries of Ukraine is a body which is tasked with enforcing regulations on fishing, enforcing fishing licenses, preventing, stopping and penalising poaching and misuse of water resources. They spend most of their time catching poachers, confiscating their illegal catch and issuing citations to them.
- Numerous municipal guard forces, which have limited scopes and powers, are created by and subordinate to the local governments in big cities. They can be classified as auxiliary police by their type of activity and their purpose is to unload the police from dealing with minor offences and disturbances, so that they can focus on dealing with bigger crimes. (Note: Laws of Ukraine. Verkhovna Rada No. 1835-III: Law on participation of citizens in guarding public order and guarding the state border. Adopted on 2000-06-22. (Ukrainian)) Those forces are usually called "municipal guards", but sometimes their title can vary: "city guard", "municipal security", "municipal squad" and so on (however, they are not allowed to use the word "police" in their name). Some of those forces started off as non-governmental initiatives, often by war veterans, but at some point were incorporated as local government institutions. Their tasks usually include patrolling together with the police, guarding public schools and clinics, maintaining peace and order in crowded areas or during mass events, preventing and stopping cases of hooliganism, vandalism, pickpocketing, drinking in public, incorrect parking, etc. Unlike conventional law enforcement bodies, they do not have firearms, but may have nonlethal weapons such as batons or pepper sprays. They may also wear stab vests. As of 2026, there is no national law regulating municipal guards yet, draft laws have been under consideration for already many years, meanwhile those municipal forces legally exist as city-owned utility companies, rather than proper law enforcement bodies. This lack of regulation of municipal guards by national law causes criticism, which point outs multiple cases of exceeding authority by members of those forces and that those forces can be used by mayors to their own interest, especially for bullying journalists and activists who stand in opposition to them. There were precedents when municipal forces were disbanded or proposed to be disbanded.

== Cybercrime ==
There are such law enforcement units that are dedicated to working with cybercrime:

- Cyberpolice (full name is the Department of cyberpolice of the National Police of Ukraine) is a unit which deals with crimes committed on the internet or using computers or using telecommunication networks. Their field of work includes illegally selling drugs or weapons, distributing child pornography through the internet, propagating terrorism and extremism, inciting violence or other crimes in the internet, cases of cyberbullying, online doxing or stalking, phishing or voice phishing, credit card fraud (including skimming), financial crimes involving cryptocurrency, identity theft in the internet, illegal distribution of personal data through the internet, online piracy and so on. It also cooperates with cyber law enforcement agencies of other countries, replying to their requests and participating in joint operations. Other tasks are collecting and systematising data about cyberthreats, informing the society about the incoming cyberthreats, educating general public on digital hygiene, counteracting Russian cyberattacks and informational operations against Ukraine on the internet.
- Department of cybersecurity of SSU (full name is the Department of counterintelligence protection of state interests in the field of information security of the Security Service of Ukraine) is a unit which is responsible for preventing, discovering and investigating cases of cyberterrorism, cyber espionage, serious cybercrime and crimes against national security committed in the cyberspace, fighting serious organised crime operating in the cyberspace (in particular, in the dark web), counteracting Russian operations in the cyberspace and social media (for example, attempts to recruit Ukrainian citizens or to spread disinformation).
- CERT-UA (abbreviated from Computer Emergency Response Team of Ukraine) is a unit of the State Cyber Protection Centre of the State Service of Special Communications and Information Protection of Ukraine which specializes in responding to technically sophisticated cyberattacks and cybercrimes against the Ukrainian government, companies or individuals. They deal with hacking attacks (including zero-day attacks), DDoS attacks, malicious software (viruses, spyware, ransomware). They make technical analysis (but not criminal investigations) of cybercrimes and help to eliminate their consequences. It is not a law enforcement body, but it works in close conjunction with the two aforementioned law enforcement bodies.

== Investigative jurisdictions ==
The Criminal Procedure Code of Ukraine assigns five law enforcement agencies to have investigative powers: National Police, Security Service, State Bureau of Investigation, Economic Security Bureau and National Anti-Corruption Bureau. Article 218 sets out the territorial jurisdictions, and article 216 sets out jurisdictions by subject, i.e. which crimes are investigated by which agency. The criminal cases are assigned to law enforcement agencies for investigation at the discretion of a relevant prosecutor.

For each of the five investigative agencies, except the National Police, the Criminal Procedure Code of Ukraine gives a list of Criminal Code of Ukraine articles that fall under jurisdiction of this agency: national security, terrorism and some other crimes to the Security Service, economic and financial crimes to the Economic Security Bureau, malfeasance and military crimes, any crimes committed by law enforcement officers, judges, and high-ranking officials to the State Bureau of Investigation, corruption crimes to the National Anti-Corruption Bureau. All crimes that are not explicitly given into jurisdiction of some agency, fall into jurisdiction of the National Police. However, there are a lot of conditions and details that make it much more complicated than that. For example, if during investigation of one crime an agency discovers another crime which is not under its jurisdiction, it may or may not proceed with investigating this crime as well.

According to the Code, a crime should be investigated by the territorial unit of the investigative agency responsible for the area where the crime took place. If the location where the crime was committed is unknown or if it was committed outside Ukraine, the territorial unit to investigate it is determined by the relevant prosecutor, taking into account the place where traces or consequences of a crime were discovered, the location of the suspect or most of the witnesses, etc. (Note: Laws of Ukraine. Verkhovna Rada No. 4651-VI: Criminal Procedure Code of Ukraine. Adopted on 2012-04-13. (Ukrainian))

SSU and ESBU have an office in each oblast (province) of Ukraine, NABU and SBI have several offices each covering several oblasts, the National Police maintains a much wider presence across the country, having their stations in every raion (county) and an officer in many territorial communities (clusters of settlements).

== International cooperation ==
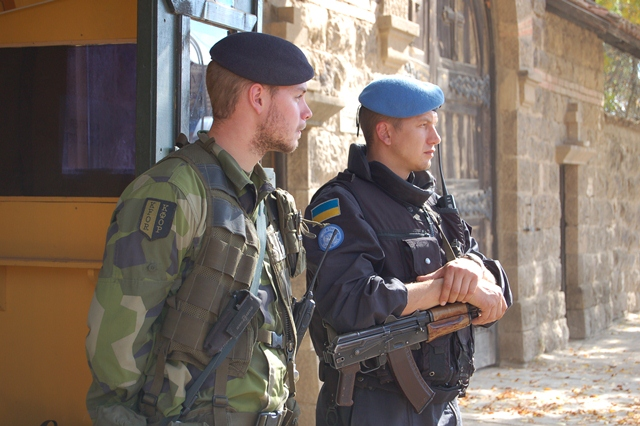
A Swedish soldier (left) and a Ukrainian policeman (right) as KFOR peacekeepers in Kosovo.

Ukrainian law enforcement widely cooperates with the law enforcement of foreign states, especially with European. It frequently takes part in joint investigations and operations, most commonly in those related to human trafficking, drug trafficking and contraband.

Ukraine has been a member of Interpol since 1992, elected to the Interpol European Committee in 2021 for a four-year term, and re-elected for another term in 2025. Ukraine also closely cooperates with Europol, with which it has a cooperation agreement, and with NATO in the area of cybersecurity.

There are some notable instances when Ukrainian law enforcement works jointly with law enforcement of other countries:

- A Joint investigation team to investigate Russian war crimes in Ukraine, in particular the Bucha massacre, was established in 2022 by the Office of the Prosecutor General of Ukraine, International Criminal Court, Eurojust, Europol and European Commission. Its work includes both collecting evidence outside Ukraine, especially taking testimonies from Ukrainian witnesses, who arrived to the EU countries as refugees, and dispatching forensic experts from the EU to analyse crime scenes in Ukraine and collect material evidence.
- Due to the intergovernmental agreement, there is a joint border and customs control at some of the border crossings at the Moldova–Ukraine border, exercised jointly by the State Border Guard Service of Ukraine and the Moldovan Border Police. It means that when crossing the border, a person or a cargo is checked only once by either of the two border agencies. As of 2024, it is planned to expand this practice to other remaining border checkpoints.
- Each year, thousands of followers of Hasidic Judaism, most of whom are citizens of Israel, come to celebrate the "Rosh Hashana", the Jewish New Year, to the Ukrainian town of Uman, where the founder of this religious branch is buried. This puts enormous strain on the local police, which is worsened by the language barrier, especially given that the number of arriving pilgrims usually reaches half of the number of constant local population. For that reason, each year since 1995 the Israel Police dispatches a group of their officers to Uman to assist Ukrainian police officers in patrolling.
- From 1994 to 2022 Ukrainian law enforcement officers took part in the UN peacekeeping missions around the globe, especially in Kosovo, together with law enforcement officers of other UN member states.

== Law enforcement agencies during the war ==
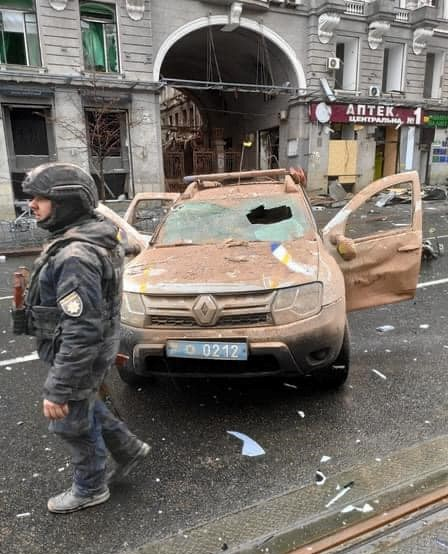
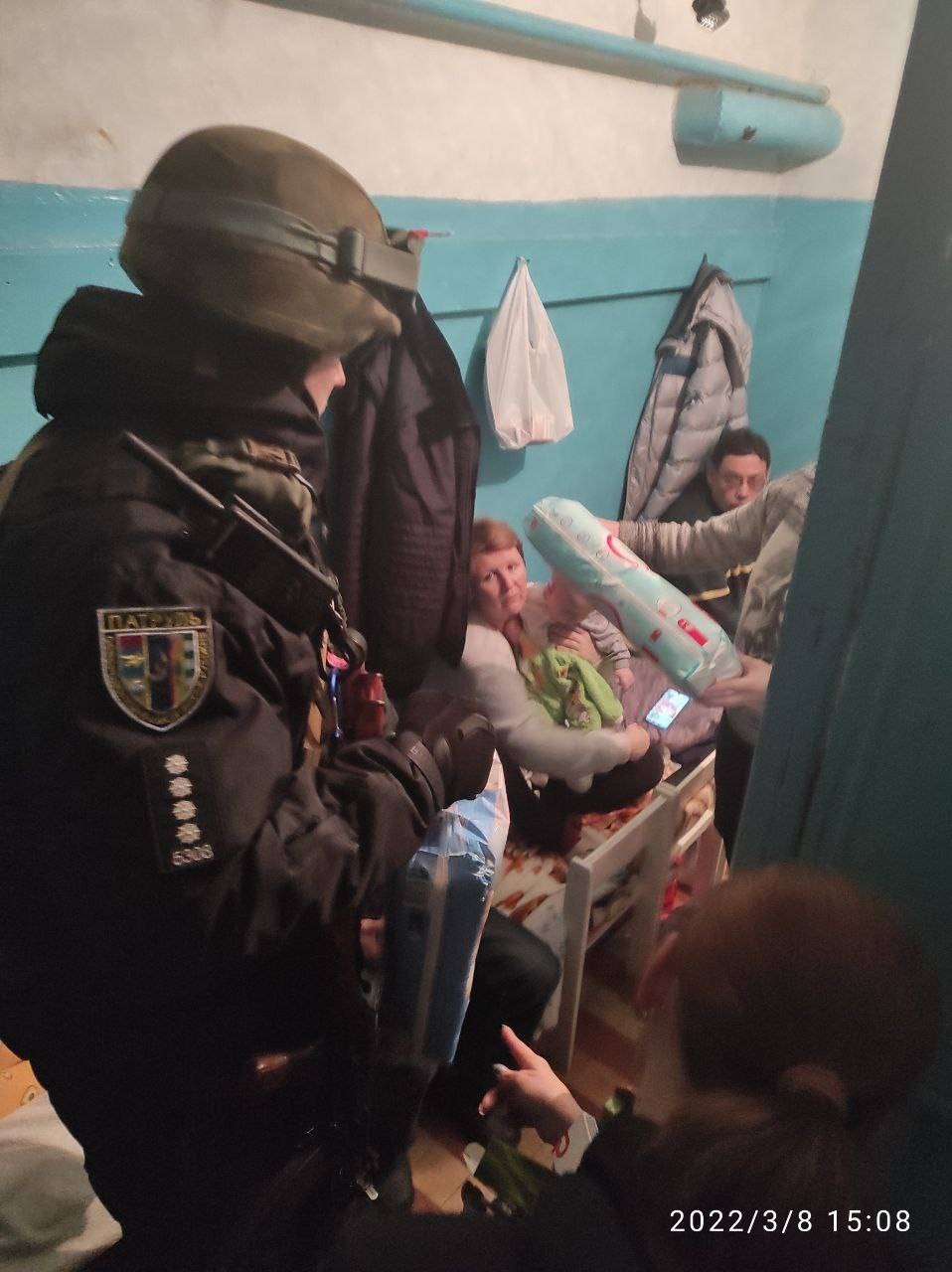
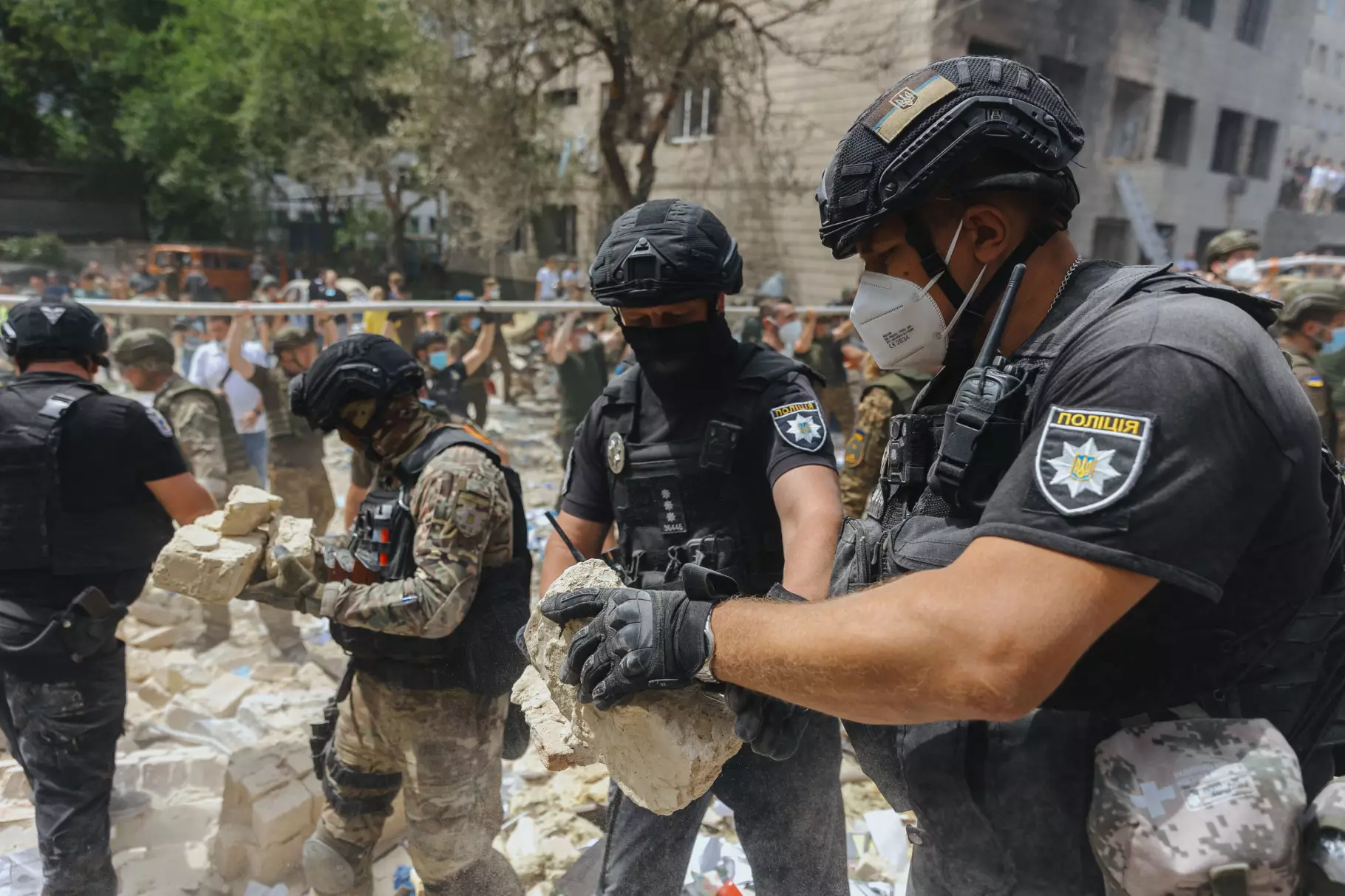
Top left: Policeman by a destroyed Renault Duster police car during the Battle of Kharkiv.
Top right: Policeman delivering humanitarian aid to civilians hiding in a shelter from bombs in Luhansk Oblast.
Bottom: Police officers help to remove rubble caused by Russian attack on Okhmatdyt hospital.

During the ongoing Russo-Ukrainian War, especially during the period of the Russian full-scale invasion of Ukraine, the police and other law enforcement bodies had to carry out functions that are not typical for law enforcement bodies at times of peace: participating in defence and countersabotage, providing humanitarian aid, investigating war crimes, catching collaborationists, enforcing curfews, assisting in carrying out mobilization.

At the very beginning of the full-scale invasion, the State Border Guard Service was one of the first to engage with the invading forces. When they moved deeper into the Ukrainian territory, the police was likewise one of the first to stand in their way. Apart from that, police together with other law enforcement units were busy with detecting and neutralising enemy sabotage squads, detecting and detaining collaborationists, organising evacuation of civil population, closing the roads for the Ukrainian military to move around faster, shooting down enemy drones and so on. National Police, National Guard, State Border Guard Service, Security Service and other law enforcement bodies continued to participate in warface together with the Armed Forces throughout the war.

Throughout the full-scale invasion, police was participating in evacuating people from territories which were becoming close to the warfare zone, delivering humanitarian aid to those who were unable or unwilling to evacuate. Police and other law enforcement take part in responses to cases when Russian missiles or drones hit civilian housing or infrastructure: gathering and documenting evidence, protecting those scenes from looting. Police officers could often be seen disassembling rubbles or tending to the wounded, together with firemen, rescuers and paramedics.

Another big task for the National Police, National Guard and Security Service are the so-called "stabilisation measures", which are initiated on the territories just left by the Russian forces. Law enforcement units enter those territories right after combat units, and start to demine land, buildings and infrastructure objects, search for remaining hiding enemy combatants, search for local collaborationists, start to document crimes that happened in period of absence of Ukrainian authorities, detect and detain those who committed crimes during that period, deploy general law enforcement activities from scratch.

At the beginning of the Russo-Ukrainian War in 2014, people who volunteered to protect the country from the invading forces, started to assemble into battalions under the Ministry of Internal Affairs, which were legally established as special patrol police forces (but, in fact, were combat units), for example battalions "Kyiv-1", "Kyiv-2", "Dnipro-1", "Azov" or "Lviv". Those battalions were formed on a territorial basis: basically one or two battalions for each region of Ukraine, but some bigger regions had more than two. This process resumed during the full-scale invasion with an initiative titled "Offensive Guard" which was launched by the Minister of Internal Affairs in 2023 to create new assault brigades for purely military tasks, not law enforcement ones. Within it, new brigades started to appear, for example the brigades of "Rage" in the police, "Charter" in the national guard or "Steel Border" in the border guard.

Another big domain of work for the Ukrainian law enforcement during this period is investigating Russian war crimes. All of those investigations are coordinated by the Office of the Prosecutor General of Ukraine, namely by its Department of war crimes, the investigations themselves are carried out by the National Police, Security Service, State Bureau of Investigations and National Anti-Corruption Bureau, with help from law enforcement agencies from other countries, international law enforcement organisations (like Europol, Eurojust or the Office of Prosecutor of the International Criminal Court) and even NGOs, which help to search for witnesses and interview them, document crimes and gather evidence. Results of those investigations are meant to be brought to the International Court of Justice or to national Ukrainian courts. Usually, those trials happen in absentia, but there were some instances when Russian soldiers, who happened to be taken POWs, were brought before the court in person to be tried for war crimes and were sentenced to long prison terms.

The police was as well tasked with assisting recruitment centers in their mobilisation efforts, especially dealing with people actively evading mobilisation.

== Educational institutions ==
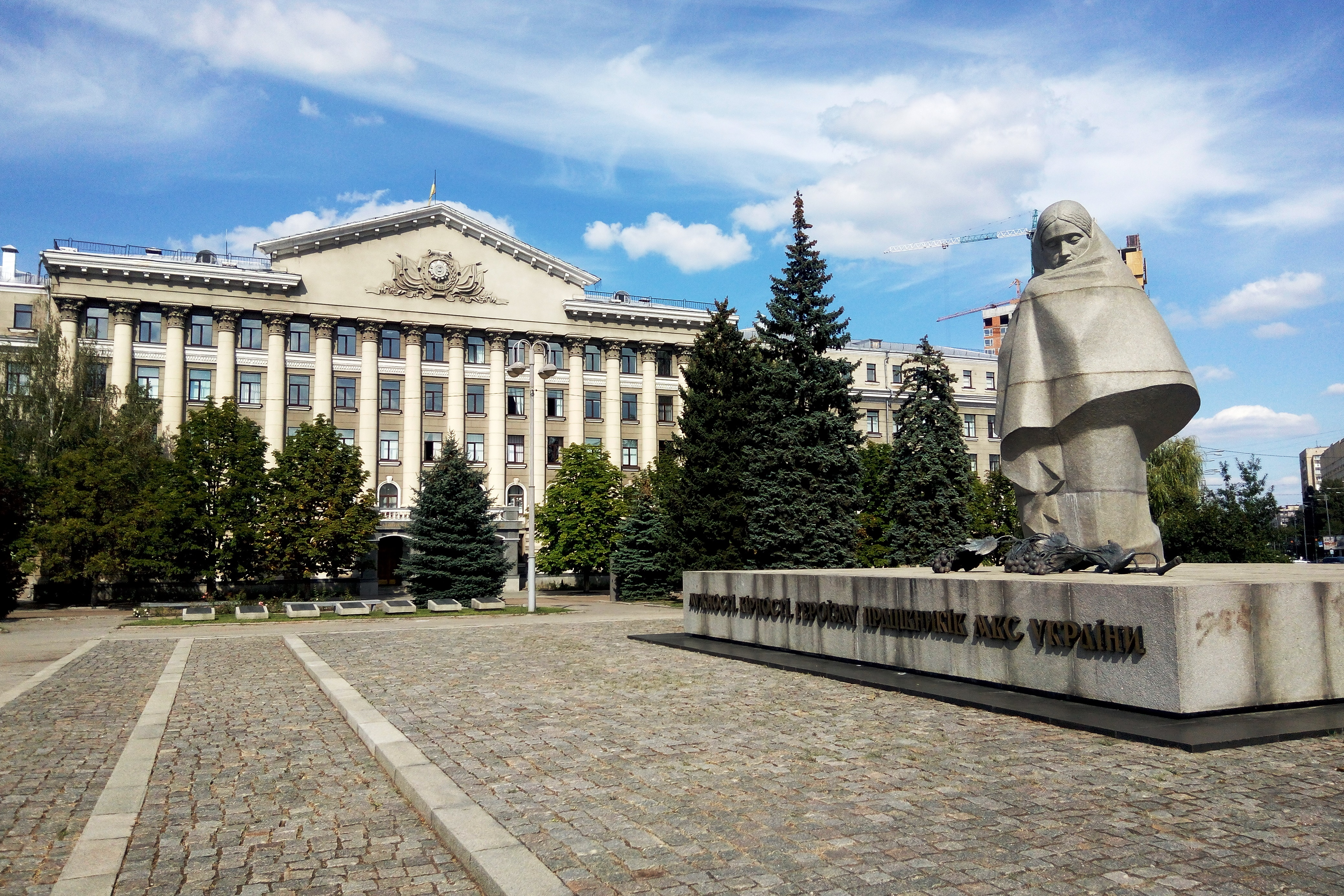
Main building of the National Academy of Internal Affairs in Kyiv.

Many higher education institutions (universities, institutes and academies) in Ukraine have bachelor's or master's educational programs in the specialty of "law enforcement activity", usually run by their law faculties or departments. But there are some higher education institutions that specialise exactly on law enforcement, and from which law enforcement bodies draw most of their highly specialised newcomers:

- National Academy of Internal Affairs in Kyiv
- Kharkiv State University of Internal Affairs
- Odesa State University of Internal Affairs
- Dnipro State University of Internal Affairs
- Lviv State University of Internal Affairs
- Donetsk State University of Internal Affairs (evacuated to Kropyvnytskyi)

Some other law enforcement bodies have higher education institutions dedicated specifically to them (they are, however, more focused on the military specialities, than on law enforcement ones):

- National Academy of the National Guard of Ukraine in Kharkiv
- Kyiv Institute of the National Guard of Ukraine
- Bohdan Khmelnytskyi National Academy of the State Border Service of Ukraine in Khmelnytskyi
- National Academy of Security Service of Ukraine in Kyiv

== Vehicle park and livery ==
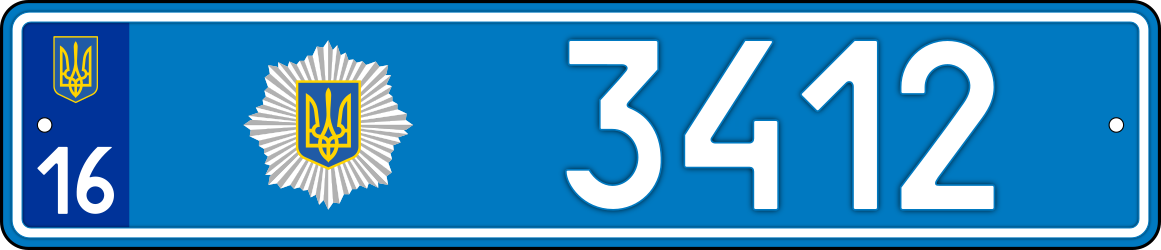
Police numberplate

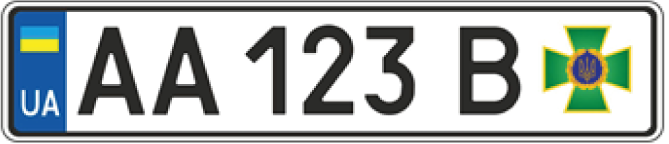
Border Guard numberplate (similar ones are used by other law enforcement bodies)

Regarding the vehicle park, Renault Duster is by far the most popular car among Ukrainian law enforcement agencies. Mitsubishi L200 is the second most popular among non-police agencies. However, the vehicle park of the police force is much more diverse, including many of Toyota Prius, Mitsubishi Outlander, Toyota Corolla, Kia Sportage, Peugeot 301, Škoda Rapid, Isuzu D-Max and other models of cars. In 2015 the police received a big shipment of Toyota Prius cars from the Japanese government in exchange for Ukraine's pollution quotas under the Kyoto Protocol. Motorcycles are rarely used by the police or other law enforcement bodies. Police, national guard and border guard operate their own fleets of helicopters.

The standard livery of the police is: two adjacent stripes, blue and yellow, going from a front wheel to a rear fender, curving towards a rear wheel; the emblem of the National Police and the word "police" (or specifying the kind of the police: "patrol police", "security police", "juvenile police", etc.) in Ukrainian on a front door; rear trunk lid is covered in pattern of repeating diagonal blue and yellow stripes; that all is on a white background, rarely on a silver one. Some other law enforcement bodies use similar liveries or those that are only somewhat different. Some of them have two adjacent blue and yellow stripes that go from a front light, go right under side windows, to a rear light. (Note: State standard of Ukraine DSTU:3849 "Road transport: colorographic schemes, identification marks, inscriptions and special signals of operative, specialised and special vehicles")

The National Police uses their special type of numberplates with white symbols on a blue background (while usual numberplates have black symbols on a white background). For other law enforcement bodies there is another type of numberplates with black symbols on a white background featuring an emblem of the law enforcement body. (Note: Unified specimens of vehicle registration plates – Ministry of Internal Affairs, 3 March 2021)

Law enforcement vehicles, as well as emergency services vehicles, are entitled to use red-and-blue lightbars. Municipal guards and private security firms can only use orange lightbars. Traffic rules grant law enforcement vehicles with lightbars and sirens turned on the priority in traffic and allow them to be exempt from some rules, e.g. they can pass on a red light or drive on an opposite-direction lane.

== Ranks ==
Regarding the ranks in law enforcement, those law enforcement bodies that are also military formations (national guard, border guard, security service, state security, military police) have the same system of ranks as the army, with the same insignia. Police and some other bodies have systems of ranks derived from the military. The difference is that some army ranks are omitted (e.g. senior private, staff sergeant, master sergeant or brigadier general) and some may have a different title (e.g. army junior sergeant becomes law enforcement corporal). Some agencies only have commissioned officers, i.e. their ranks start from lieutenant (NABU and ESBU). Also, law enforcement may use visual elements to show ranks on their insignia that are different from those used in the military. (Note: Laws of Ukraine. Cabinet of Ministers of Ukraine No. 564-2020-п: Decree on the assignment of special ranks to private and commanding staff of the State Bureau of Investigation and their correlation with other special, military and class ranks. Adopted on 2020-05-27. (Ukrainian))

Unlike many other law enforcement agencies in the world, there are no such specifically nonmilitary ranks as constable, agent, detective, inspector, superintendent, commissioner, etc.

In general, the averaged sequence of ranks used in Ukrainian law enforcement agencies is as follows: private (blank), corporal, sergeant, senior sergeant (chevrons), junior lieutenant, lieutenant, senior lieutenant (stars), major, lieutenant colonel, colonel (stars and laurel wreaths), general (star and national coat of arms).

== Logos of law enforcement bodies ==
The Ministry of Internal Affairs together with the National Police and National Guard use Brunswick star in their logo. Some of those law enforcement bodies, which are also military formations, use cossack cross as a basis for their logos, all in one form, but with different colors. Law enforcement bodies created in recent years tend to have logos with simple geometrical shapes and text.

Ministry of Internal Affairs

National Police

National Guard

State Border Guard Service

State Migration Service

Security Service

National Agency on Corruption Prevention

Asset recovery and management agency

National Anti-Corruption Bureau

Specialized Anti-Corruption Prosecutor's Office

State Bureau of Investigation

Economic Security Bureau

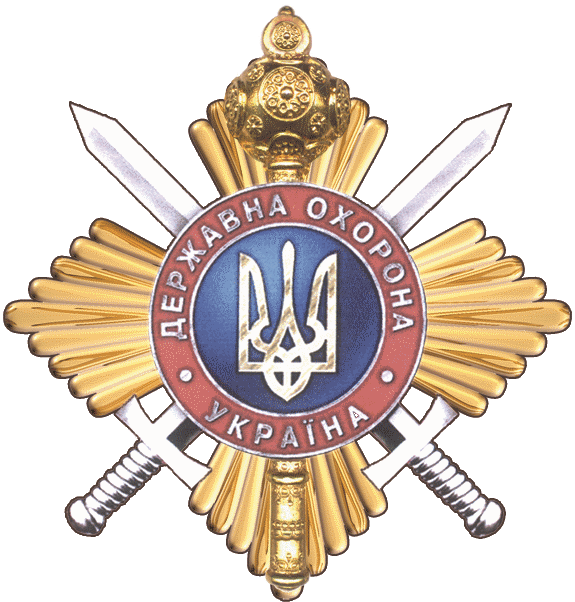
State Security Administration

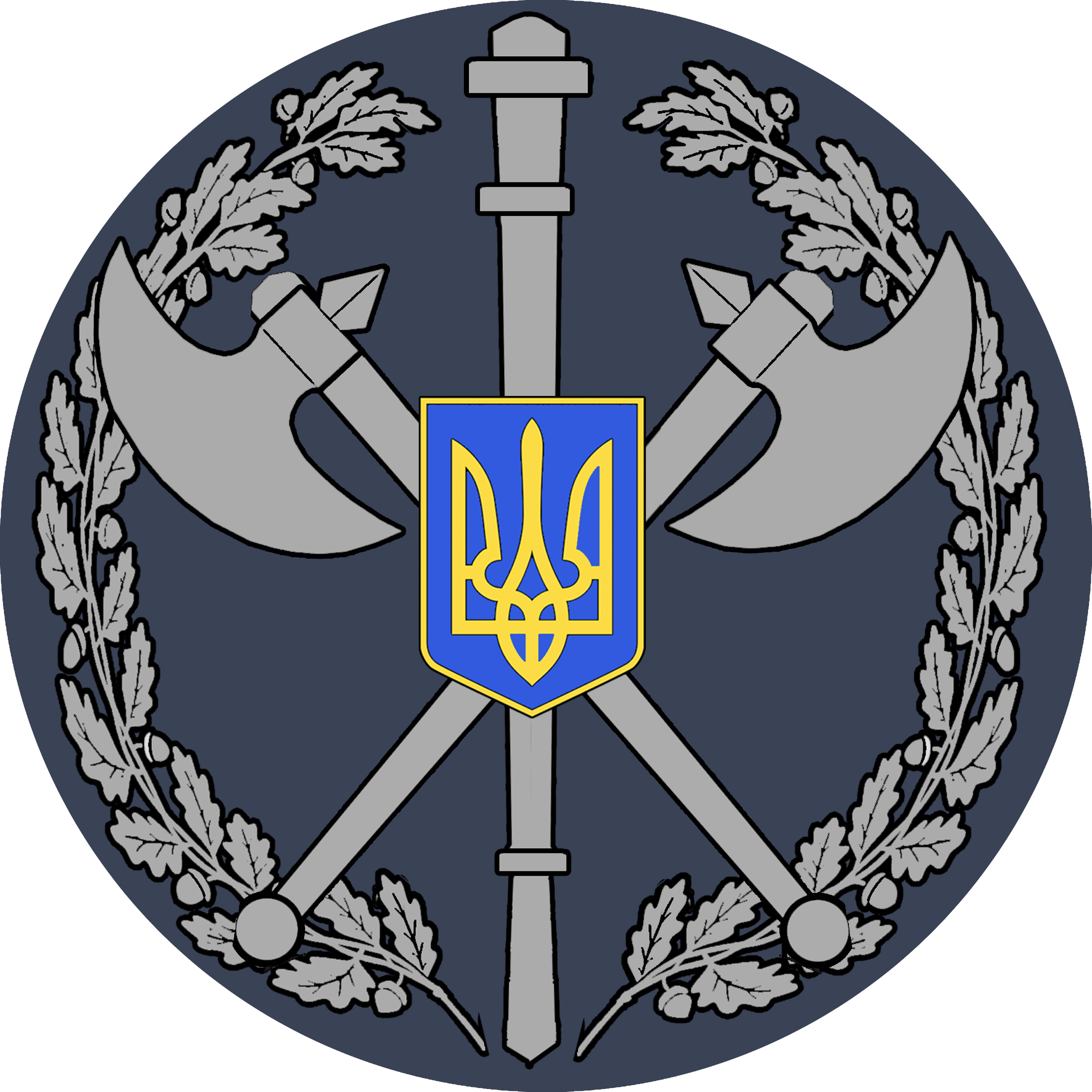
Court Security Service

Military Service of Law Enforcement

State Penitentiary Service

== See also ==
- Law of Ukraine
- Judiciary of Ukraine
- Law enforcement in Europe
- Government of Ukraine
- Ministry of Internal Affairs (Ukraine)
- Ministry of Justice (Ukraine)
- Militsiya (Ukraine)
- Crime in Ukraine
- Human rights in Ukraine
- Prisons in Ukraine
- Law enforcement by country
- List of law enforcement agencies
- List of border control organisations
- List of protective service agencies
- List of anti-corruption agencies
