= Law of Ukraine =

The legal system of Ukraine is based on civil law, and belongs to the Romano-Germanic legal tradition. The main source of legal information is codified law. Customary law and case law are not as common, though case law is often used in support of the written law, as in many other legal systems. Historically, the Ukrainian legal system is primarily influenced by the French civil code, Roman Law, and traditional Ukrainian customary law. The new civil law books (enacted in 2004) were heavily influenced by the German Bürgerliches Gesetzbuch.

The primary law making body is the Ukrainian Parliament (Verkhovna Rada), also referred to as the legislature (Ukrainian: законодавча влада, romanized: zakonodavcha vlada). The power to make laws can be delegated to lower governments or specific organs of the State, but only for a prescribed purpose. In recent years, it has become common for the legislature to create "framework laws" and delegate the creation of detailed rules to ministers or lower governments (e.g. a province or municipality). After laws are published in Holos Ukrayiny they come into force officially the next day.

== Areas ==
Ukrainian law is commonly divided into Public law, Private law, and International law. These areas of the legal system are further subdivided into Civil law (including Family law, Inheritance law, Contract law and Commercial law, Law of Obligations, Property law, Intellectual property law, Companies law, Land law, and Tort law), Criminal law, Constitutional law (including laws on the structure of the state), Administrative law, and International law.

=== Civil law ===
Civil law regulates the everyday life of citizens and other legal entities, such as corporations. The main code of Ukrainian civil law is the Civil Code of Ukraine. It comprises provisions governing ownership, intellectual property rights, contracts, torts, obligations, inheritance law, and the definition of legal entities. The code introduces new types of business contracts into the legal practice, including factoring, franchising, rent service, and inherited contracts. Civil litigation is governed by the Civil Procedural Code of Ukraine.

=== Criminal law ===
Criminal law deals with the prosecution and punishment of criminal offenses. The Criminal Code of Ukraine contains the written criminal laws of Ukraine. There is no capital punishment in Ukraine. The maximum criminal punishment is life imprisonment, which can be reduced by decree of the President of Ukraine to 25 years of imprisonment, but only after 20 years of sentence service. The Parliament of Ukraine has the power of amnesty for prisoners not serving life sentences. Criminal proceedings, investigation, and court examination in criminal trials are regulated by The Criminal Procedural Code of Ukraine, which was not changed since 1962 when Ukraine was a republic of the Soviet Union till the Ukrainian Parliament passed the new Code of Criminal Procedure in April 2012.

=== Constitutional law ===
Constitutional law frames the constitution and the structure of Ukraine. It regulates the powers of democratic institutions, the organization of elections and the division of power between central and local government. See also the article on the Constitution of Ukraine. Only the Constitutional Court of Ukraine is allowed to determine the constitutionality of laws created by the legislature.

=== Administrative law ===
Administrative law is the area of law that regulates the operation of the various levels of Ukrainian Government, including the process for people and legal entities to appeal decisions by the government. This code is referred to as the Administrative Code in Ukraine.

=== International law ===
International law, also referred to as the Law of Nations, involves the application of international laws in Ukraine. International agreements, ratified by the Parliament of Ukraine, are a part of Ukrainian legislation. The Constitution of Ukraine allows the direct application of most international laws in Ukrainian courts. If an international agreement of Ukraine prescribes rules other than those set by the Law of Ukraine, the rules of that international agreement shall apply. Laws regulating jurisdiction with an international aspect, such as because parties come from different countries, are not part of international law, but form a specific branch of civil law.

In September 2005, the Law of Ukraine on Private International Law was enacted. The Law sets the procedure for the regulation of private legal relations which are subject to other legal systems in addition to that of Ukraine.

=== Commercial law ===
The Commercial Code of Ukraine describes the details for compliance with the Constitution of Ukraine's clauses for commercial activity. The Code regulates the fundamentals of commercial activity, including business entities, property basis, responsibility for violations, peculiarities of legal regulation, and foreign commerce regulation.

==== Types of corporations ====
- TOV (uk:Товариство з обмеженою відповідальністю, ТОВ) - Ukrainian "Limited liability company" with obligate charter capital
- PP (uk:Приватне підприємство, ПП) - Ukrainian "Limited liability company" without obligate charter capital
- TDV (uk:Товариство з додатковою відповідальністю, ТДВ) - Ukrainian "Additional liability company"
- PrAT (in past ZAT), uk:Приватне акцiонерне товариство, ПрАТ — Ukrainian "Private joint-stock company"
- PAT (in past VAT), Публічне акцiонерне товариство, ПАТ — Ukrainian "Public joint-stock company"

=== Legal liabilities ===
Ukrainian legal liability includes constitutional liability, which is imposed on President or Deputy (Member of Parliament) by the Parliament of Ukraine, criminal liability, which is imposed by local courts in the form of sentencing, civil liability, which is imposed by local courts in the form of decision, administrative liability, which is imposed by administrative courts in form of decision, and disciplinary liability, which is imposed by superior officials or specially created organizations.

== How positions are assigned ==
Judges are imposed by the Supreme Council of Ukraine. Attorneys at law are imposed by the Disciplinary Bar Commission. Notaries are imposed by the Ministry of Justice of Ukraine. Public prosecutors are imposed by regional Superior officials. Policemen are imposed by Superior officials.

== List of acts of parliament ==
The Constitution of Ukraine is a supreme law of Ukraine. Laws and other legislation should be adopted on its basis and conform to it.

Because Ukrainian legal system is code-based, there are a number of codified laws in the main spheres of national legislation. These include:

- Civil Code of Ukraine
- Criminal Code of Ukraine
- Family Code of Ukraine
- Labor Code of Ukraine
- Land Code of Ukraine
- Water Code of Ukraine
- Natural Resources Code of Ukraine
- Administrative Code of Ukraine
- Budget Code of Ukraine
- Forestry Code of Ukraine
- Customs Code of Ukraine
- Maritime Code of Ukraine
- Housing Code of Ukraine
- Commercial Code of Ukraine
- Air Transportation Code of Ukraine
- Tax Code of Ukraine (pending)
- Code of Civil Procedure
- Code of Criminal Procedure
- Administrative Procedure Code
- Business Arbitration Code
- Prison Code

Only the Parliament of Ukraine is entitled to issue normative acts in the form of laws. The laws of Ukraine are the highest normative acts in Ukraine.

The secondary legislation of Ukraine comprises other normative acts including decrees, resolutions, and orders issued by the President of Ukraine, Cabinet of Ministers of Ukraine, National Bank of Ukraine, ministries and other state agencies. They are adopted on the basis and in realization of the general provisions of laws.

== Courts system ==
Ukraine's court system is widely regarded as corrupt. Ukrainian judges have been arrested while taking bribes.

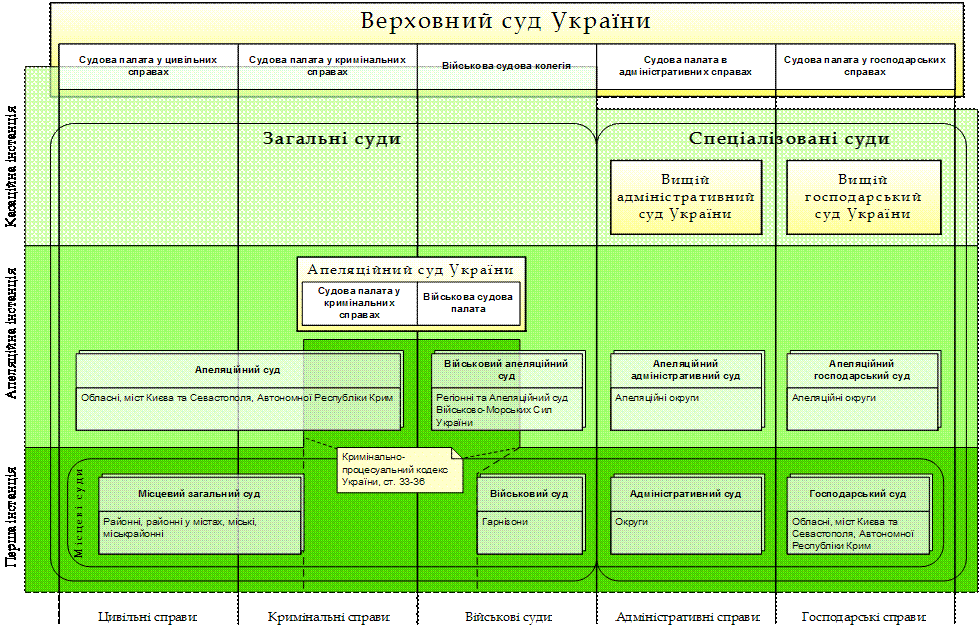
Courts system of Ukraine

Courts in Ukraine are divided by jurisdiction including constitutional courts, general (criminal and civil jurisdiction) courts, economic courts, and administrative courts. There is also the Constitutional Court of Ukraine, the Supreme Court of Ukraine, Appellate Courts (in every Region oblast of Ukraine), and District Courts in every city, town, or raion (which is a subdivision of oblast). As well, there is the High Administrative Court of Ukraine, Local Administrative Courts in every administrative district, usually oblast, the High Commercial Court of Ukraine, Local Commercial Courts in every administrative district, usually oblast, and Military court in every Appellate Court in every regional oblast. There is also the Tertiary Court created in accordance to the law "On Tertiary Court" and registered in Ministry of Justice of Ukraine.

In order to become a judge in Ukraine, one must be 25 years old. Newly inducted judges are appointed by the President of Ukraine and serve for five years. Afterwards, judges are elected for life by the Parliament of Ukraine. Judges are not elected by the citizenry as practiced in many western countries. The judicial branch of power in Ukraine is not completely independent. To detain or arrest a judge, special permission by the Parliament of Ukraine is needed.

A judge shall not refer to political parties and trade unions, as well as participate in any political activity, have representative mandate, occupy any other paid posts, or do any other paid work except that which is scientific in nature, teaching or creative value. According to the law, a judge, while executing justice, shall follow the Constitution and the laws of Ukraine and shall ensure full, thorough and objective consideration of the cases adhering to the terms set by law. They are also obliged to take measures concerning prevention of unauthorized dissemination of the information the state and/or commercial entity considers secret or is confidential and became known to him/her in the process of doing official duties. Moreover, the Law requires a judge to refrain from the actions that defame a judge and may cause doubt that she/he is objective, as well as unprejudiced and independent.

The Law sets the system of guarantees of judge's professional activity which are necessary to approve unprejudiced and objective decisions. The Law guarantees to judges their personal immunity, secrecy of court decisions, legal protection, as well as material and social provision. The Law also prohibits any not envisaged by law interference in judge's activity concerning justice execution, detention or arrest of a judge without the consent of the Verkhovna Rada until bill of indictment concerning him/her is carried out by the court.

== Law schools ==
Ukraine has taken steps to reform its education frameworks in consistence with the Bologna process. By the mid-2000s, Universities started granting undergraduate Bachelor of Laws degrees (about 3 years for full-time students and 4 years for part-time students) and graduate Master of Laws degrees (about 5 years for full-time students and 6 years for part-time students). In Soviet times, the only undergraduate degree (following a 10-year secondary education) was a 5-year Specialist Diploma, with a thesis requirement, usually placing it somewhere between a bachelor's and master's degree in the West. Degrees are awarded by authorities of the State Examination Board of University. The University degree gives people the right to engage in professional legal activities in Ukraine as a legal advisor. However, judges and criminal defense attorneys must take an additional state licensing exam.

== Post-graduate education ==
The post-graduate system has not been reformed. Law academic degrees in Ukraine are the Candidate of Science of Jurisprudence (CSJ) and Doctor of Science of Jurisprudence (DSJ), equivalent to Doctor of the Science of Law (L.Sc.D.) The Diploma is awarded after the successful defense of dissertation (thesis) by the Higher Attestation Commission (VAK). Full text of all defended dissertations are kept in the Vernadsky National Library of Ukraine.

=== Fields of study ===
Scientific degrees awarded by VAK are classified into an established list of specialties, grouped into the following major sections.

- 12.00.01 Theory of law
- 12.00.02 Constitutional law
- 12.00.03 Civil law
- 12.00.04 Economic law
- 12.00.05 Labor law
- 12.00.06 Land law
- 12.00.07 Administrative law, finance law
- 12.00.08 Criminal law
- 12.00.09 Criminal procedure
- 12.00.10 Court system
- 12.00.11 International law
- 12.00.12 Philosophy of law

A database of all practicing Doctors of Science of Jurisprudence is maintained by the Ministry of Education of Ukraine.

=== University docents ===
A docent of a university is one who has the right to teach. The qualifications include one dissertation (CSJ) and demonstrating the competence of conducting scientific research independently.

=== University professor ===
A professor of a university is one who has the right to teach. The qualifications include one dissertation (doctoral degree (DSJ)) and demonstrating the competence of conducting scientific research independently.

=== Academician ===
The title Academician denotes a full member of the National Academy of Sciences of Law.

=== Corresponding member ===
There also exists a lower-rank title, variously translated corresponding member or associate member of the National Academy of Sciences of Law.

== Lawyers and law firms ==
Law is practiced in Ukraine by jurists (legal consultants, counsels, attorneys), professionals awarded a diploma after graduation from a law faculty of a university. Law offices are maintained by lawyers who register it as a law firm in the Ministry of Justice, and are awarded state certification.

The Constitution of Ukraine defines an attorney's work as "securing the right for protection against accusation and provide legal assistance while considering cases in courts and other state bodies in Ukraine". In this case, the Law “On the Bar and Advocate's Activity” defines the Bar as a voluntary professional public association.

In order to defend a person charged with criminal offense, a person must be an attorney. An attorney under the Law “On the Bar and Advocate's Activity” can be a person who has higher legal education, stated by the diploma of Ukraine, or in line with the international treaties of Ukraine diploma of a foreign country, the work experience in the field of law no less than two years, fluent in the Language of the State, has passed a qualification exam, received a certificate entitling him to practice law, and taken the Ukrainian Oath of the Attorney.

The Law determines that attorneys cannot hold a previous conviction. The Law also stipulates that the attorney cannot work in court, a prosecutor's or state notary's office, bodies of internal affairs, security service, or state administration bodies.

In order to defend a person charged with criminal offense, an attorney must have a certificate entitling him to practice law (issued by Regional Qualification-Disciplinary Bar Commission) or a Power of Attorney letter. There are 25 Regional Qualifications- Disciplinary Bar Commissions in Ukraine: each in every Region (oblast) and one in the City of Kyiv and the City of Sevastopol.

A list of attorneys is kept and published by the Supreme Qualification Bar Commission of the Cabinet of Ministers of Ukraine.

To represent a client in a non-criminal case or to be an in-house a person must have a higher legal education.

A list of law firms is kept and published on the official website of Ministry of Justice of Ukraine.

A list of lawyers from Kyiv University List of Taras Shevchenko National University of Kyiv people.

A list of lawyers from Ukraine List of jurists.

== Notaries ==
Notary in Ukraine is based on the guidelines set forth by the law entitled "On Notariate". According to the law, the Notariate is a system of bodies and officials obliged to certify rights, certify facts that have legal force and perform other notary actions as stated in the law with the purpose of giving them legal force. In Ukraine, notary operations are carried out by state notaries, private notaries or officials of executive bodies of local (village, settlement, city) councils, if there are no notaries therein. The difference between state and private notaries is the service fees imposed by public notaries are fixed by the state, whereas the only aspect regulated by the State in regards to private notaries is the price floor.

Any person who considers occupation of the notary post must be a citizen of Ukraine, have higher legal education (university, academy, institute), work on probation during 6 months in a state notary office or at private notary, pass a qualification exam and receive a certificate permitting notary actions. A person with any outstanding convictions cannot be a notary by law.

The Certificate permitting notary activities may be abrogated by the Ministry of Justice of Ukraine in the following cases: - on notary's own initiative; - loss of Ukrainian citizenship or departure to permanent residence outside Ukraine; - notary's non-conformity to the occupied post because of health condition preventing him from accomplishment of notary activities; - coming into force of conviction sentence against notary.

Notaries are not allowed by law to work in courts, police, and prosecutor offices, nor represent citizens in courts or any other government offices. The major role of notaries in Ukraine is to notarize documents and contracts between persons in accordance to Civil Code of Ukraine. Every notarized document, agreement, contract, etc. is issued on numerated, special paper form, protected by security features and is registered in the notary's records which is kept after completion in regional (oblast) archives indefinitely. A notary database is kept and accessible to public on the official website of the Ministry of Justice of Ukraine. As of 2007, about 13,000 registered notaries practice in Ukraine.

== Criminal justice system ==
Criminal Investigations are carried out under official authority by law enforcement personnel such as the Police, the tax police (tax militia), Public Procurators (Public Prosecutors), and the Security Service of Ukraine.

In Ukraine and other civil law jurisdictions, the jury holds equal power to three professional judges. The jury and judges first consider the question of guilt. Then, if applicable, they consider the penalty to apply. Juries are only used for severe felony cases with a ten-year or higher sentence.

== Prison system ==
The State Department of Ukraine for Enforcement of Sentences oversees the prison system of Ukraine.

As of 2007, the total prison population in Ukraine was 240,000 people out of the 48 million population.

Prisons in Ukraine are classified as pre-trial or remand prisons (SIZO), high security prisons, medium security prisons, and low security prisons.

Those who are charged with criminal offenses which entail sentencing for three years or more are arrested and held before trial in investigative isolation during the period of criminal investigation and after sentencing are moved to the prison as indicated by the courts in the sentencing decision. Bail is rarely used by courts in Ukraine.

== Identification ==
In Ukraine, every person over 18 years of age must carry a passport or (for foreigners) an alien document. A person unable to provide passport is allowed to be arrested and held in police custody for up to 72 hours in order to establish the identity thereof.

== See also ==
- Incarceration in Ukraine
- Constitution of Ukraine
- Ukrainian nationality law
- Income tax in Ukraine
- Law enforcement in Ukraine
- Ukrainian copyright law
- Ministry of Justice (Ukraine)
- Judicial system of Ukraine
