= Law of Ukraine (legislation) =

Piece of primary legislation

A law of Ukraine (Note: Ukrainian: закон України, romanized: zakon Ukrayiny) is primary legislation in Ukraine adopted by the Verkhovna Rada (the national parliament of Ukraine) and signed by the president. Laws of Ukraine support and supplement the fundamental law of country, Constitution of Ukraine. Some laws were codified into Civil Code, Criminal Code and so on.

For procedural reasons, Verkhovna Rada also issues resolutions that explain how legal documents should be presented to parliament. Bills are usually considered by the Verkhovna Rada following the procedure of three readings; the President of Ukraine must sign a law before it can be officially promulgated. After laws are published in Holos Ukrayiny they come into force officially the next day. The Verkhovna Rada can take the decision on final adoption of the bill after the first or second reading if the bill is considered as such that does not require refinement. It can also apply the rare procedure of the second first reading, which opens the possibility for a radical revision of the bill, its structure, and key provisions.

== Codified Laws ==
There are following codices of law that are active in Ukraine.

- Air[space] Code (2011)
- Tax Code (2010)
- Budget Code (2010)
- Code of Administrative Proceedings (2005)
- Civil Procedural Code (2004)
- Criminal Executive Code (2003)
- Civil Code (2003)
- Customs Code (2012)
- Family Code (2002)
- Land Code (2001)
- Criminal Code (2001)
- Water Code (1995)
- Maritime Code (1995)
- Code on Subsoil (bowels of the Earth) (1994)
- Forest Code (1994)
- Economic Procedural Code (2003)
- Code on Administrative Offenses (1984)
- Labor Code (1971)
- Criminal Procedural Code (1960)

=== Inactive Codes ===
- Correctional Labor Code (1970)
- Code on Marriage and Family (1969)
- Criminal Procedural Code (1960)
- Residential Code (1983)
- Economic Code (2003)
- Civil Code (1963)
- Civil Procedural Code (1963)
- Budget Code (2001)
- Air[space] Code (1993)
- Economic Procedural Code (1991)
- Criminal Code (1960)
- Water Code (1972)
- Customs Code (2002)
- Customs Code (1991)
- Land Code (190)
- Land Code (1970)

== Important State Laws ==
- On Legal Succession of Ukraine

== Secondary legislation ==
All bodies of executive power issue their own secondary legislation.

- President - decree (ukase)
- Cabinet - resolution (rarely decree)
- other - orders

== See also ==
- Legislation on languages in Ukraine
- Electoral legislation of Ukraine
