= Civil Code of Ukraine =

Civil code adopted in 2003

The Civil Code of Ukraine (Ukrainian: Цивільний кодекс України, Tsyvilnyi Kodeks Ukrayiny) is a Ukrainian codification of private law (civil code), basic normative legal act. It regulates personal non-property and property relations (civil relations), based on legal equality, free will, property independence of their participants. It was adopted by the Verkhovna Rada of Ukraine on 16 January 2003.

Prior to the adoption of the Civil Code of Ukraine, the Civil Code of the Ukrainian SSR dated 18 July 1963 was in force on the territory of Ukraine (insofar as it didn't contradict the legislation of Ukraine adopted after the proclamation of Ukraine's independence after 24 August 1991). Following dissolution of the Soviet Union in 1991, Ukraine has shifted from the system of socialist law to civil law.

== History ==
The objective necessity of adopting a new civil code arose immediately after the proclamation of independence and the reorientation of economic development to a market path. At the same time, due to the difficult economic situation, many provisions of the Civil Code of the Ukrainian SSR, which contained provisions with the expression of amounts in rubles, lost their significance. To ensure the development of new economic relations, a number of laws were adopted, in particular “On Property”, “On Entrepreneurship”, “On Business Societies”.

The development of the code has been carried out for over 12 years, however, until the adoption of the final version among the legal community of Ukraine, no consensus was reached on certain provisions of the code. In particular, there was no consensus on the question of the existence of collective property, the independence of family law and private international law. As a result, the book "Family Law", which formed the basis of the Family Code of Ukraine, was removed from the Civil Code. Also later, a separate Law of Ukraine "On Private International Law" was adopted.

After adoption, the code was not signed by the President of Ukraine (the veto was applied, the act was returned to parliament with a number of proposals), but the Verkhovna Rada of Ukraine overcame the President's veto by its decision. The main remarks of the President, which have not lost their relevance today, boiled down to contradictions between the Civil Code and the Economic Code of Ukraine adopted on the same day. The codes used different techniques for constructing legal structures and different terminology, but at the same time a number of social relations were simultaneously regulated by two codes.

== The structure of the Civil Code ==
Built on the pandect system, the Civil Code of Ukraine consists of six books, delimited by scope:

1. The Book One. General Provisions
  - Chapter 1. Basic Provisions
  - Chapter 2. Persons
  - Chapter 3. Objects of Civil Rights
  - Chapter 4. Transactions. Representation
  - Chapter 5. Terms and Conditions. Statute of Limitations
2. The Book Two. Personal Intangible Rights of an Individual
3. The Book Three. Ownership and Other Property Rights
  - Chapter 1. Ownership
  - Chapter 2. Proprietary Rights to Another's Property
4. The Book Four. Intellectual Property Rights
5. The Book Five. Law of Obligations
  - Chapter 1. General Provisions on Obligations
  - Chapter 2. General Provisions on Contracts
  - Chapter 3. Certain Types of Obligations
  - Subsection 1. Contractual Obligations (Chapter 54-77)
  - Subsection 2. Non-Contractual Obligations (Chapter 78-83)
6. The Book Six. Inheritance Law

There were 1308 articles in the code at the adoption time. Articles of the Code are divided into parts, which in turn can be subdivided into paragraphs.

== Scope of regulation ==
In essence and purpose, the Civil Code is a code of private law, ie a leading act in the system of legislation governing relations in the private sphere, its provisions should apply not only to traditional "purely civil" relations, but also to the relations of related parties. Thus, to regulate family relations, when using hired labor, in the areas of natural resources and environmental protection, the norms of the Civil Code are applied in a subsidiary manner, ie in cases where these relations are not regulated by other (special) legislation.

== See also ==
- Legislation of Ukraine

== Sources and literature ==
- The Civil Code of Ukraine Current version.
- The Scientific and Practical Commentary on the Civil Code of Ukraine, in 2 volumes/Edited by O. Dzera, N. Kuznetsova, V. Luts - 5th edition, revised and supplemented - Kyiv : Yurinkom Inter, 2013 - ISBN 978-966-667-442-8.
- Civil Law of Ukraine: Academic course: Textbook in 2 volumes - 2nd edition, supplemented and revised, - Volume 2. Special Part. Kyiv: In Jure Publishing House, 2006.
- Civil law of Ukraine. Contractual and non-contractual obligations: a textbook / Edited by S. Bychkova - Kyiv: KNT, 2006. - 498 p.
