= Administrative law in Ukraine =

Administrative law of Ukraine is the body of law that governs the activities of administrative agencies of non-state entities, while also subjecting state actions to the rule of law, offering regulated entities a legal means to contest administrative decisions.

== Regulation ==
A regulation is an officially defined, legally compulsory and effected by state compulsion behavior norm applying to participants that guarantees public rights and liberties of residents and normal functioning of civil society and the state.

Regulated entities both have defined rights and bear legal responsibilities.

== Principles ==
The administrative law guarantees the rights and liberties of regulated entities and enables civil society and the state to operate in a well-defined manner.

== Subjects ==
The subjects of the administrative law are natural and legal persons, which have rights and legal liabilities and are empowered with specific legal properties.

== Methods ==
The main methods of the administrative law are persuasion and compulsion.

== Enforcement ==
Administrative law is enforced by the district (municipal) court and the appeals system that reviews disputed cases. The court is responsible for protecting the rights, liberties and legal interests of natural and legal persons, including regulated entities and the general public. The system works by attempting to prevent breaches and remedying the breaches that do occur, via reimbursement of losses to victims and bringing guilty persons to administrative and/or other legal responsibility.
