= Accounting Chamber (Ukraine) =

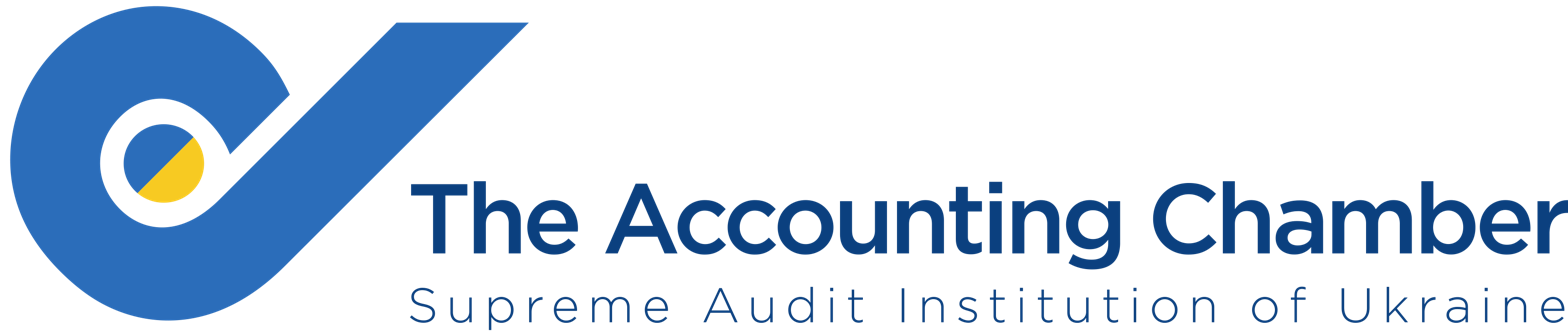
the logo of the Accounting Chamber

The Accounting Chamber (Ukrainian: Рахункова палата України, romanized: Rakhunkova palata Ukrainy) is an audit body of the Verkhovna Rada and the supreme audit institution of Ukraine. The chamber's main purpose is to provide a control over use of funds of the State Budget of Ukraine (Article 98, Constitution of Ukraine).

The Chamber exercises control over the receipt of funds to the State Budget of Ukraine and their use. It is accountable to the Verkhovna Rada of Ukraine and regularly informs it about the results of its work.

The creation of the Chamber was mandated by Ukraine's constitution and subsequent laws, and its operations are regulated by those laws.

== Composition and structure ==
The Accounting Chamber consists of 13 members.

The members of the Chamber include the Chair (and its deputy) and other members.

To ensure the fulfillment of the powers assigned to the Chamber, the Secretariat operates, consisting of departments, territorial, and other structural units (including the advisory services for the members of the Chamber).

The organization of the work of a member of the Chamber is supported by their advisory service, which comprises no more than three advisors.

The structure and staffing of the Secretariat of the Chamber are approved by the Chamber within the budget allocations for its operations.

The maximum number of staff in the Secretariat of the Chamber is approved by the Verkhovna Rada of Ukraine upon the proposal of the Chamber within the budget allocations for its activities.

The rights, duties, and powers of the members of the Chamber and the officials of the Secretariat of the Chamber are defined by Law of Ukraine on the Accounting Chamber 1.

== See also ==
- 2020–2022 Ukrainian constitutional crisis
- Civil Oversight Council of the National Anti-corruption Bureau of Ukraine
- Committee of the Verkhovna Rada on issues of budget
- Corruption in Ukraine
- European Union Anti-Corruption Initiative in Ukraine – Technical assistance in fighting corruption by the EU and Denmark in Ukraine
- High Anti-Corruption Court of Ukraine – Ukrainian court concerning corruption in Ukraine
- List of anti-corruption agencies
- National Agency for Prevention of Corruption – Ukrainian government agency
- National Anti-Corruption Bureau of Ukraine – Ukrainian watchdog agency
