= 2020 Ukrainian constitutional crisis =

There was a constitutional crisis in Ukraine from 27 October until 25 December 2020, with an aftermath until about May 2022. On 27 October 2020, decision No. 13-r/2020 of the Constitutional Court of Ukraine (CCU) invalidated much of Ukraine's 2014 anti-corruption reform as unconstitutional. The resulting situation made it almost impossible to effectively investigate and prosecute judges (including those on Constitutional Court itself) and other public officials for financial corruption (such as bribery). In response to the highly controversial ruling, the legislative and executive branches of the government of Ukraine, aided by international organisations such as the Venice Commission of the Council of Europe, made quick efforts to remedy the situation with the new Law No. 1079-IX of 15 December 2020, restoring the functioning of the National Agency on Corruption Prevention (NACP).

In the aftermath, there was a confrontation between the executive and judicial branch of the government, wherein the legislative branch played a conciliatory role. The Supreme Court decided on 14 July 2021 to reverse a decree by the president to suspend the head of the Constitutional Court. (Note: The crisis surrounding judge Tupytsky's position abated somewhat when the judge's term expired in May 2022.) The Verkhovna Rada, the Parliament of Ukraine, attempted to resolve the tensions between the Court and the Presidency by establishing the Ethics Council on 5 August 2021 to reform the appointment process for judicial bodies such as the High Council of Justice with international guidance and oversight, but its functioning has been hindered by internal resistance to reform. The full-scale Russian invasion of Ukraine since 24 February 2022 complicated matters, while the declaration of martial law in Ukraine on the same day offered some means to take emergency measures for pressing legal issues. Tensions abated when the term of the CCU 's head justice expired in May 2022, and he illegally left the country.

== Background ==
In July 2020, 49 People's Deputies of Ukraine (47 of these were members of the Opposition Platform — For Life political party) appealed to the Constitutional Court with a motion to recognize as unconstitutional the law on the High Anti-Corruption Court of Ukraine of 7 June 2018. On 16 September, the Constitutional Court ruled unconstitutional certain provisions of the law on the National Anti-Corruption Bureau of Ukraine (NABU). On 28 July, it declared unconstitutional the Presidential decree of 16 April 2015 on the appointment of Artem Sytnyk as NABU Director. On 27 October the court, on the motion of 47 legislators, recognized the provisions of the laws on e-declarations' vetting as unconstitutional and stripped the relevant watchdog, the National Agency on Corruption Prevention (NACP) of powers to vet declarations and identify conflicts of interest. This decision deprived the NACP of access to state registers required for vetting declarations of candidates for government offices, thus blocking the appointment of officials, including those elected in the October 2020 Ukrainian local elections. The NABU responded by claiming that as a result of the court ruling, all criminal cases probing inaccurate asset declaration would be closed, while officials exposed on abuse would avoid responsibility. On 28 October, the NACP shut down public access to the Unified State Register of Asset Declarations, which was restored overnight the following day in line with the Shmyhal Government decision following public outrage.

== Constitutional crisis ==
=== October 2020 ===
Decision No. 13-r/2020 of 27 October 2020 ruling of the Constitutional Court of Ukraine ruled invalidated much of Ukraine's 2014 anti-corruption reform as unconstitutional. The Court thereby reversed prior precedent, and threw constitutional law in Ukraine into chaos. It was regarded as a blow to anti-corruption reform in Ukraine. The CCU justices were split 11–4 in favour of the decision, with Justices Holovaty, Lemak, Kolisnyk, and Pervomayskyi dissenting, and arguing that the majority opinion lacked a proper justification.

On 29 October, President Zelenskyy submitted to the Ukrainian parliament a draft law, offering an early termination of powers of the Constitutional Court's entire composition. Lawmakers rejected this bill, including several members of Zelenskyy's ruling Servant of the People political party. Some accused him of a power grab. On 27 January 2021 Zelenskyy withdrew the bill.

=== November 2020 ===
Following the decision, President Volodymyr Zelenskyy warned that if parliament did not restore these anti-corruption laws, foreign aid, loans and a visa-free travel to the European Union would be at risk. Governor Kyrylo Shevchenko of the National Bank of Ukraine reported that Ukraine would not receive the scheduled $700 million IMF load before the end of 2020 because of the issue. IMF assessment teams had not visited Ukraine for eight months, which was necessary for further IMF loan tranches to be released. The European Union (EU) issued a statement that the court's decision called "into question a number of international commitments which Ukraine assumed in relation to its international partners, including the EU."

=== December 2020 ===
On 4 December 2020, the Ukrainian parliament restored anti-corruption legislation shut down by the court decision, when it reauthorized criminal penalties for officials who provide false information about their incomes.

In December 2020, the Constitutional Court of Ukraine was unable to carry out its usual functions because of some justices boycotting the court. On 29 December 2020 President Zelenskyy suspended the courts chairperson Oleksandr Tupytskyi for two months in an effort to end the crisis. The following day the Constitutional Court stated it considered the President's decree "legally insignificant" and they did not plan to implement it. The Prosecutor General's office had also asked President Zelenskyy to suspend Tupytskyi for two months after he failed to show up for police questioning. Tupytskyi is under investigation of alleged attempts to influence a witness through bribery and providing false testimony three times in a case against a company that produces transport equipment in 2018 and 2019, when he served as deputy chairman of the Constitutional Court.

== Aftermath ==
=== 2021 ===
On 8 February 2021, the Kyiv District Administrative Court dismissed a lawsuit requested by Tupytskyi against the State Security Administration for not allowing him to work in the Constitutional Court. The court noted that Tupytskyi had not provided evidence confirming the danger to "his rights and interests."

On 26 February 2021, President Zelenskyy signed a decree that suspended chairperson Tupytskyi for another month.

On 27 March 2021, Zelenskyy annulled the decree of former President Viktor Yanukovych of May 2013, appointing Oleksandr Tupytskyi and Oleksandr Kasminin judges of the Constitutional Court of Ukraine. According to Zelenskyy, their tenure did "pose a threat to state independence and national security of Ukraine, which violates the Constitution of Ukraine, human and civil rights and freedoms." According to Zelenskyy, their appointments were canceled following an audit of the decrees of President Yanukovych carried out by the National Security and Defense Council of Ukraine.

On 14 July 2021, the Administrative Court of Cassation within the Supreme Court of Ukraine declared Zelenskyy's 27 March 2021 decree illegal and revoked it. The court concluded that "the President of Ukraine does not have the authority to decide on the dismissal or termination of powers of judges of the Constitutional Court or to decide to revoke the decree on the previous appointment of a judge of the Constitutional Court."

On 19 October 2021 the Constitutional Court (itself) began considering the constitutionality of President Zelenskyy's three decrees that suspended the courts own chairperson Tupytskyi. Proceedings were opened due to a constitutional request of 49 Ukrainian MP's, mostly members of the Batkivshchyna faction.

On 26 November 2021 President Zelenskyy appointed Oksana Hryshchuk and Oleksandr Petryshyn judges of the Constitutional Court, although on 14 July 2021 the Constitutional Court had declared Zelenskyy's 27 March 2021 decree to dismiss Oleksandr Tupytskyi and Oleksandr Kasminin illegal and thus technically there were no vacancies in the Constitutional Court. Four days later, the judges of the Constitutional Court decided not to swear in Hryshchuk and Petryshyn "until vacancies appear." As the Supreme Court upheld Judge Tupytskyi's lawsuit against President Zelenskyy and had declared the decree unlawful on 14 July 2021, Tupytskyi remained the head of the CCU until his term of office expired on 15 May 2022. The Verkhovna Rada, the Parliament of Ukraine, attempted to resolve the tensions between the Court and the Presidency by establishing the Ethics Council on 5 August 2021 to reform the appointment process for judicial bodies such as the High Council of Justice with international guidance and oversight, but its functioning has been hindered by internal resistance to reform.

=== 2022 ===
The full-scale Russian invasion of Ukraine since 24 February 2022 complicated matters, while the declaration of martial law in Ukraine on the same day offered some means to take emergency measures for pressing legal issues. Just two days before the invasion, on 22 February 2022, a majority of the members of the High Council of Justice (HCJ) resigned voluntarily in reaction to attempts by the Ethics Council to assess the ethics and integrity standards of the HCJ, thereby preventing subjection to the Council's integrity assessment. As the HCJ was now without a quorum, it could not function, creating major institutional and practical issues when Russia invaded a fortnight later. The Constitution of Ukraine and international norms guarded by the Venice Commission prohibit constitutional amendments in war-time, but certain constitutional provisions and martial law strengthen the position of the Parliament of Ukraine, the Verkhovna Rada, to address and overcome times of crisis.

On 15 March 2022, the Rada adopted Law of Ukraine No. 2128-IX, amending 2016 Law "On the Judiciary and the Status of Judges" to temporarily enthrust the Chief Justice of the Supreme Court with the powers of the High Council of Justice, while the State Judicial Administration of Ukraine was given the competence to designate the number of judges and territorial bodies, so that the judiciary of Ukraine continued to function throughout the entire unoccupied territory of the country. By 9 November 2022, the Ethics Council had completed its integrity assessment of the HJC's members and 80 candidates for the judiciary. In December 2022, the District Administrative Court of Kyiv (DACK) was dissolved to put an end to its endemic corruption.

Meanwhile on 15 May 2022, Oleksandr Tupytskyi's term expired as of the Head of the Constitutional Court (whom president Zelenskyy unsuccessfully tried to remove from office in early 2021). Tupytskyi illegally left the country on 27 May 2022, while Serhiy Holovatyi became the acting head of the CCU (officially from 29 December 2020 to 29 May 2024). During a special plenary session on 7 December 2022, three other justices resigned, leaving the CCU with 13 justices (just above the minimum of 12 for a quorum), but the vacancies would not be filled until the selection process had been reformed.

== See also ==
- 2006 Ukrainian political crisis
- 2007 Ukrainian political crisis – 2007 political crisis in Ukraine
- Civil Oversight Council of the National Anti-corruption Bureau of Ukraine
- Corruption in Ukraine
- European Union Anti-Corruption Initiative in Ukraine – Technical assistance in fighting corruption by the EU and Denmark in Ukraine
- High Anti-Corruption Court of Ukraine – Ukrainian court concerning corruption in Ukraine
- List of anti-corruption agencies
- National Agency on Corruption Prevention – Ukrainian government agency
- National Anti-Corruption Bureau of Ukraine – Ukrainian watchdog agency
- Ukraine and the International Monetary Fund

== Bibliography ==
- Gitlin, Jackelyn (24 January 2024). "Constitutional Crisis in Ukraine: The Fallout from the Constitutional Court and Attempts at Judicial Reform During War". Maryland Journal of International Law. 38 (1).
