= Mykola Zlochevsky =

Ukrainian politician

- Микола Злочевський
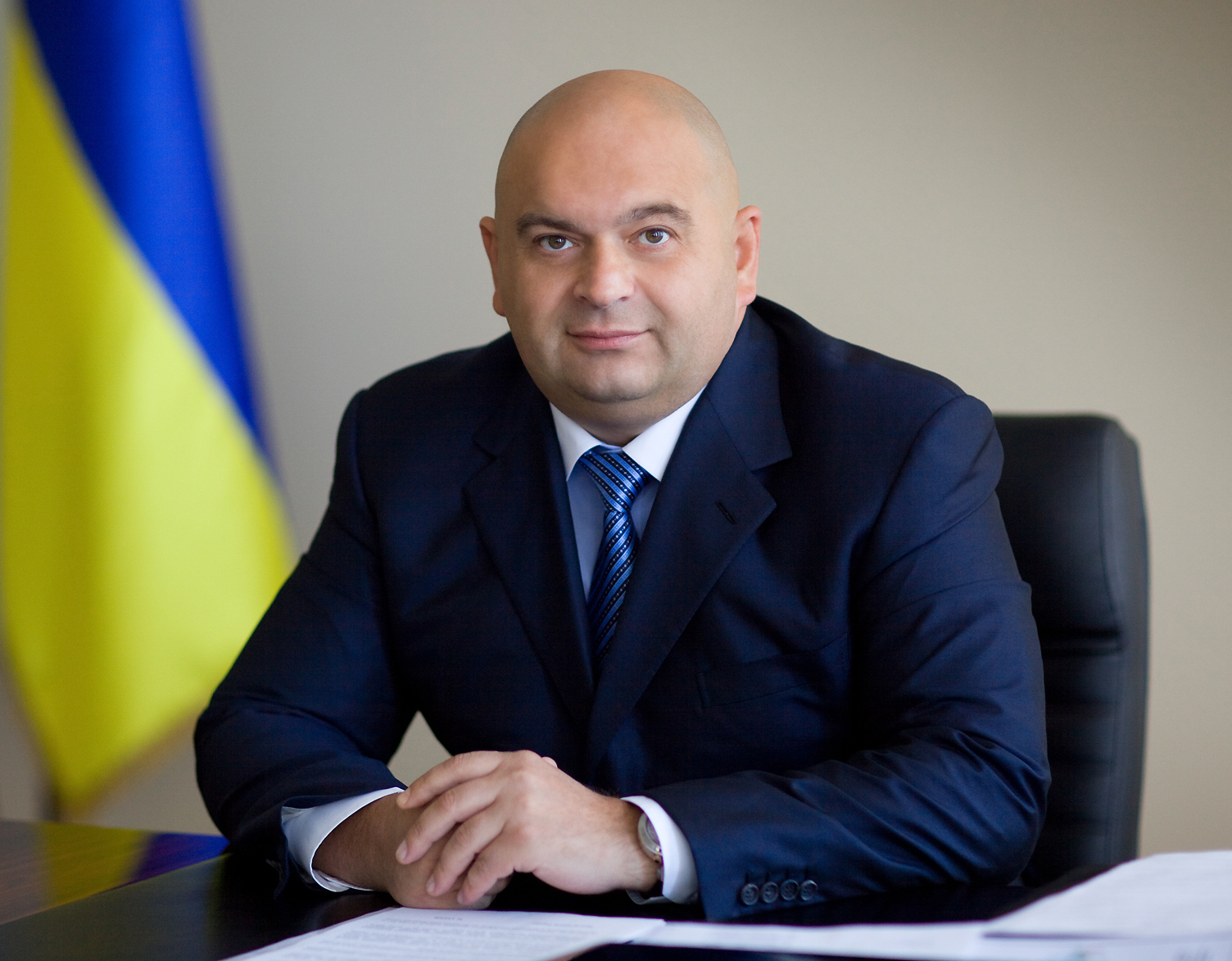

12th Minister of Ecology and Natural Resources
- In office 2 July 2010 – 20 April 2012
- Prime Minister: Mykola Azarov
- Preceded by: Viktor Boiko
- Succeeded by: Eduard Stavytsky

Deputy Secretary of the National Security and Defense Council
- In office 20 April 2012 – 26 February 2014
- President: Viktor Yanukovych
- Secretary: Andriy Klyuev

Personal details
- Born: Микола Владиславович Злочевський; 14 June 1966 (age 59) Kyiv, Ukrainian SSR, Soviet Union
- Education: International University of Business and Law in Kherson – Accounting and Auditing; Odesa Law Academy – Law Faculty
- Known for: Burisma Holdings

Mykola Vladyslavovych Zlochevsky (Ukrainian: Микола Владиславович Злочевський; born 14 June 1966) is a Ukrainian oil and natural gas businessman, politician, and an oligarch. Zlochevsky was Minister of Ecology and Natural Resources from July 2010 until April 2012 and was the deputy secretary for Economic and Social Security of the National Security and Defense Council from April 2012 until February 2014 when Euromaidan occurred. He is wanted by Ukrainian authorities for attempting to bribe the prosecutors in order to drop all charges against him.

== Career ==
=== Business ===
In 2002, he co-founded the largest independent oil and natural gas company Burisma Holdings with Mykola Lisin - Zlochevsky and Lisin each owned a 50% interest in Burisma Holdings. Lisin, was co-founder of Infoks fuel trading and refining holding, and his former college classmate and party colleague through changing affiliations. Zlochevsky was vice-president of Infoks until, like Lisin, entering parliament in 2002.

Lisin died in a car crash on 17 April 2011. At the time Burisma had shares in the Ukrainian gas and oil producers Aldea, Pari, Esko-Pivnich, and the First Ukrainian Petroleum Company.

Burisma Holdings changed owners in 2011 when it was taken over by the off-shore Cyprus enterprise Brociti Investments, and subsequently, moved addresses under the same roof as Ukrnaftoburinnya (UNB) and Esko-Pivnich, two gas companies which were partly owned by Ihor Kolomoyskyi through off-shore entities in the British Virgin Islands. Kolomoyskiy already controlled the conglomerate Privat Group. In the 2012 the CEO of UNB, Oleh Kanivets, confirmed Kolomoysky as the owner of Burisma saying, “The Privat Group is the immediate owner. This company [Burisma] was founded by Mykola Zlochevsky some time ago, but he later sold his shares to the Privat Group.”

Following the 2022 Russian invasion of Ukraine Zlochevsky donated hundreds of millions Ukrainian Hryvnia's (UAH) to the Armed Forces of Ukraine, the Ukrainian Special Operations Forces and the "Army of Drones" project of the Ukrainian government.

=== Governmental posts ===
Zlochevsky served as Ecology and Natural Resources Minister during most of the first cabinet of Mykola Azarov, and during both the later part of Azarov's first government and all of Azarov's second government, he served as deputy secretary on National Security and Defense Council (NSDC) of the President of Ukraine Viktor Yanukovych.

== Investigations into Burisma and Zlochevsky ==
In 2012, Viktor Pshonka, (Note: After the fall of Viktor Yanukovych's government in February 2014, Pshonka, a Russian citizen with an arrest warrant issued for him, fled from Ukraine to Russia and was last publicly seen on 13 April 2014 at Rostov-on-Don in Russia. The Pshonka gold jewelry businesses, formerly located in Kramatorsk, Donetsk Oblast, Ukraine, moved to Sevastopol in Russian annexed Crimea in the fall 2014. Russia has illegally occupied Crimea since the Russian invasion of Ukraine in February 2014.) the Ukrainian prosecutor general, began investigating Burisma Holdings owner, Zlochevsky, over allegations of money laundering, tax evasion, and corruption during 2010–2012.

In April 2014, Burisma Holding's board of directors appointed Hunter Biden, son of then U. S. Vice President Joe Biden, to the board, where he was said to have earned over $80,000 monthly. Joe Biden had been made the point man on Ukraine after February 2014, when the pro-Russian president, Viktor Yanukovych, was ousted and fled. Then U. S. President Barack Obama's administration was prepared to work with the new government, a position shared with European governments and institutions, such as the World Bank and the International Monetary Fund. But they were all concerned about Ukraine's corruption, which had plagued the country ever since it gained independence in the 1991 breakup of the Soviet Union. Joe Biden became a frequent visitor to Ukraine. By his own count, Biden said he went there about a dozen times from early 2014 through early 2016.

In April 2014, the Serious Fraud Office of the United Kingdom froze approximately $23 million belonging to companies controlled by Zlochevsky. At the end of 2014, Zlochevsky fled Ukraine amid allegations of unlawful self enrichment and legalization of funds (Article 368–2, Criminal Code of Ukraine) during his tenure in public office. In January 2015, Prosecutor General Vitaly Yarema announced that Zlochevsky had been put on the wanted list for alleged financial corruption. At the end of January 2015, the Central Criminal Court in London released the $23 million that were blocked on accounts of Zlochevsky due to inadequate evidence. In June 2018, the Serious Fraud Office stated that the case was closed.

In early November 2014 Deutsche Bank reported that $24 million of funds from his companies were wired from Cyprus to the Latvia branch of PrivatBank, the bank co-owned by the oligarch in the Dnipropetrovsk region, Ihor Kolomoyskyi, and nationalized at the end of 2016.

Zlochevsky returned to Ukraine in February 2018 after investigations into his Burisma Holdings had been completed in December 2017 with no charges filed against him.

On 18 April 2018, an alleged recording of part of a conversation between President of Ukraine Petro Poroshenko and fugitive Ukrainian lawmaker Oleksandr Onyshchenko was released by Onyshchenko which implicated Zlochevsky in graft.

On 15 June 2018, after the Solomyansky District Court in Kyiv had annulled the ruling of the Specialized Anti-Corruption Prosecutor's Office (SAP) to close a criminal proceeding against him in 2017, Zlochevsky was accused of having illegally issued, while he was Ecology Minister in 2010–2012, oil and gas licenses to the companies that belonged to him.

According to Ukrainian authorities Zlochevsky is suspected of "theft of government funds on an especially large scale". Authorities said the criminal investigation on suspicion of embezzlement is currently on hold because Zlochevsky's whereabouts cannot presently be determined. As of 2019, Zlochevsky is reported to live in Monaco. According to an investigation by Al Jazeera he bought Cypriot citizenship somewhere between 2017 and 2019.

On 1 August 2023 the High Anti-Corruption Court of Ukraine convicted, after 2.5 years of trial, Zlochevsky to a fine of four thousand tax-free minimum incomes, equivalent to 68,000 Ukrainian Hryvnia's. This case was started in 2020 and was about the "record bribe" of $6 million given for closing a criminal case against Burisma he had offered to (then) SAP head Nazar Kholodnytskyi and the leadership of the National Anti-Corruption Bureau of Ukraine. The verdict was part of a plea agreement between Zlochevsky and SAP in which Zlochevsky admitted guilt.

== Personal life ==
In 2019, Zlochevsky bought two apartments in Dubai for $11 million. In 2022, he transferred ownership of the apartments to his daughter Anna.

In 2023, Zlochevsky's daughters Anna and Karina bought real estate in Ukraine's capital Kyiv.
