= Semen Kryvonos =

Ukrainian law enforcement administrator

- Семен Кривонос
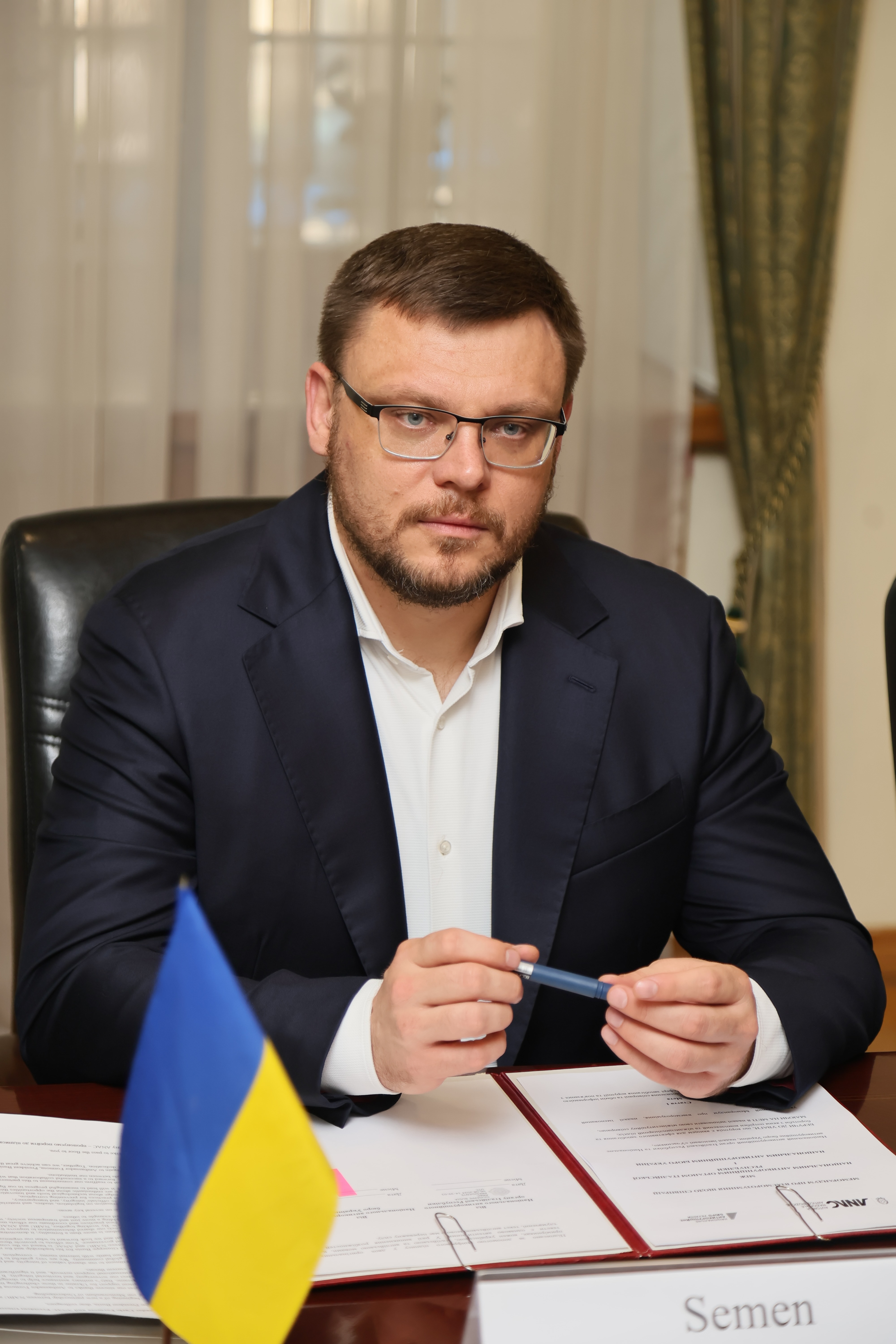
- Education: National University of Life and Environmental Sciences of Ukraine, National Academy for Public Administration
- Occupation: Director of the National Anti-Corruption Bureau of Ukraine
- Years active: March 6, 2023–present
- Predecessor: Artem Sytnyk

Semen Yuriiovych Kryvonos (Ukrainian: Семен Юрійович Кривонос) is the Director of the National Anti-Corruption Bureau of Ukraine since March 6, 2023.

== Biography ==
Semen Kryvonos was born on January 16, 1983, in Mariupol, Ukraine.

In 2000, he graduated from secondary School No. 11 in Kremenchuk, Poltava Region. He pursued higher education at the National Agrarian University, where he earned a degree in agronomy in 2005. Continuing his studies, Kryvonos obtained a master's degree in public administration from the National Academy for Public Administration under the president of Ukraine in 2007.

In 2010, he graduated from the National University of Life and Environmental Sciences of Ukraine, specializing in law, and earned the qualification of a legal specialist.

Kryvonos began his public service career in 2007 as the Chief Specialist of the Family and Youth Unit in the Department for Family, Youth, and Sports at the Holosiivskyi District State Administration in Kyiv. From 2011 to 2015, he worked in various territorial units of the Ministry of Justice in the Odesa and Kyiv regions.

In 2015, he became the First Deputy Head of the Odesa Customs Service under the State Fiscal Service. During his tenure, he implemented the anti-corruption initiative Open Customs Space, which aimed to eliminate smuggling schemes.

After resigning from his customs position, Kryvonos worked as a Senior Legal Adviser at the International Development Law Organization (IDLO).

In 2018, he received a lawyer's certificate and began practicing law, both independently and within a law firm.

Between 2020 and 2021, Kryvonos led the NGO Office of Simple Solutions and Results, contributing to the development of multiple reforms presented at the National Reform Council under the president of Ukraine.

From May 2021 to March 2023, Kryvonos served as the head of the State Inspectorate for Architecture and Urban Planning of Ukraine.

== Work at NABU ==
In 2022–2023, Semen Kryvonos participated in the selection process for the position of director of the National Anti-Corruption Bureau of Ukraine (NABU). Following a transparent competition overseen by a commission that included representatives from international organizations, he was appointed director by the Cabinet of Ministers of Ukraine on March 6, 2023.

As director, Kryvonos announced plans to expand NABU's staff, complete the establishment of regional offices, and create internal structures to strengthen the Bureau's institutional independence. He also emphasized the importance of conducting a timely independent audit of NABU's operations.

In October 2023, under the initiative of Semen Kryvonos, and with support from the European Union Anti-Corruption Initiative in Ukraine (EUACI), the Government of Japan, and the International Development Law Organization (IDLO), an expert group conducted an independent technical assessment of NABU's activities from January 2021 to June 2023. The assessment concluded that NABU had developed into a strong and effective institution with a substantial track record in investigating high-level corruption. The report highlighted NABU's impeccable reputation and noted that its employees demonstrated a high level of integrity.

Since March 2023, under the leadership of Semen Kryvonos, NABU has strengthened its cooperation with the Specialized Anti-Corruption Prosecutor's Office (SAPO) and significantly intensified its investigations into high-level corruption cases. During this period, NABU exposed 21 senior government officials, 39 heads of state-owned enterprises, 16 judges, and 11 members of parliament for corruption-related offenses.

In 2024, NABU continued to make progress to combat high-level corruption, uncovering multimillion-dollar schemes. In the first half of the year, NABU initiated 323 investigations, issued 166 charges, and referred 64 cases to court.

On October 3, 2024, the first external independent audit of NABU commenced. The audit commission, comprising experts in security, anti-corruption, asset recovery, and auditing, was appointed by the Cabinet of Ministers based on recommendations from international organizations providing technical assistance in anti-corruption efforts.
