= Civil Oversight Council of the National Anti-corruption Bureau of Ukraine =

Civil Oversight Council of the National Anti-corruption Bureau of Ukraine (COC NABU) is an independent civil institution, formed according to the National Anti-corruption Bureau of Ukraine Act to ensure the Bureau's transparency, to set public control of its work, and to strengthen its public communications.

== The history of COC NABU ==
On October 14, 2014, the President of Ukraine Petro Poroshenko had signed the National Anti-corruption Bureau of Ukraine Act, which included creating the COC.

Signed by the President of Ukraine, the Regulation of COC NABU's work states the goals of the institution:

- Conducting hearings of the information about the actions and the execution of the plans and objectives of the Bureau;
- reviewing the Bureau's reports and forming their conclusions on them;
- choosing two of the COCs members to join the Disciplinary Committee of NABU;
- and other rights, stated in the Regulation.

== Members of the COC (2020–2021) ==
Current member of the COC (2020—2021)
№	Name	Organisation
1	Kusmich Bohdan (Кузьмич Богдан Володимирович)	PA «Anti-corruption Axe» (ГО «Антикорупційна Сокира»)
2	Savchuk Mark (Савчук Марк Сергійович)	PA «Anti-corruption Axe» (ГО «Антикорупційна Сокира»)
3	Symonenko Ihor (Симоненко Ігор Вікторович)	PA «Anti-corruption Axe» (ГО «Антикорупційна Сокира»)
4	Yevtyfeev Valery (Євтифєєв Валерій Олександрович)	PA «ASTARTES» (ГО «АСТАРТЕС»)
5	Bozhkov Denys (Божков Денис Анатолійович)	PA «XENOS» (ГО «КСЕНОС»)
6	Goreslavtsev Artem (Гореславцев Артем Михайлович)	PA «ASTARTES» (ГО «АСТАРТЕС»)
7	Ivanchenko Vladyslav (Іванченко Владислав Юрійович)	PA «SORORITAS» (ГО «СОРОРІТАС»)
8	Kolodko Taras (Колодько Тарас Олександрович)	PA «XENOS» (ГО «КСЕНОС»)
9	Oksymets Bohdan (Оксимець Богдан Олександрович)	PA «ASTARTES» (ГО «АСТАРТЕС»)
10	Prudkovskykh Viktor (Прудковських Віктор Вячеславович)	PA «SORORITAS» (ГО «СОРОРІТАС»)
11	Karas Yevhen (Карась Євген Васильович)	PU «Veteran Movement of Ukraine» (ГС «Рух Ветеранів України»)
12	Trofimenko Viktor (Трофіменко Віктор Євгенійович)	PA “Veteran Brotherhood” (ГО “Ветеранське братерство”)
13	Salata Maksym (Салата Максим Сергійович)	PA “Veteran Brotherhood” (ГО “Ветеранське братерство”)
14	Gniushevytch Mykola (Гніушевич Микола Григорович)	PU «Veteran Movement of Ukraine» (ГС «Рух Ветеранів України»)
15	Sergeev Kyrylo (Сергєєв Кирило Олександрович)	

The incumbent Head of the PCC is Mark Savchuk, representing PA «Anti-corruption Axe».

Anti-corruption Axe (until February 2021 — «Democratic Axe of the Horde») an anti-corruption public organisation formed in Kyiv in 2018.

Since June 6th, 2018, the organisation members are in the COC, controlling the actions of the National Anti-corruption Bureau of Ukraine and ensuring Bureau’s non-involvement in corruption schemes.

== See also ==
- 2020–2022 Ukrainian constitutional crisis
- Accounting Chamber (Ukraine)
- Corruption in Ukraine
- European Union Anti-Corruption Initiative in Ukraine – Technical assistance in fighting corruption by the EU and Denmark in Ukraine
- High Anti-Corruption Court of Ukraine – Ukrainian court concerning corruption in Ukraine
- List of anti-corruption agenciesAccounting Chamber (Ukraine)
- National Agency on Corruption Prevention – Ukrainian government agency
- National Anti-Corruption Bureau of Ukraine – Ukrainian watchdog agency
