= Oleksandr Klymenko (detective) =

Ukrainian detective and lawyer

- Олександр Клименко
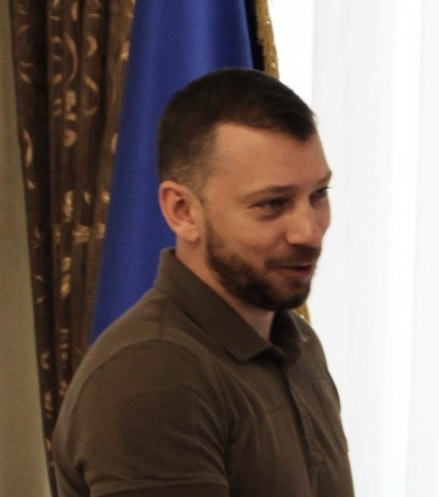
- Kymenko in July 2022

Head of the Specialized Anti-Corruption Prosecutor's Office
- Incumbent
- Assumed office 28 July 2022
- Appointed by: Prosecutor General of Ukraine
- President: Volodymyr Zelenskyy

Personal details
- Born: September 1986 (age 40) Ukrainian SSR, Soviet Union
- Citizenship: Ukrainian
- Education: Yaroslav Mudryi National Law University
- Occupation: detective
- Profession: lawyer

Oleksandr Vasylovych Klymenko (Ukrainian: Олександр Васильович Клименко; born in September 1986) is a Ukrainian detective and lawyer. He has been head of the Ukrainian Specialized Anti-Corruption Prosecutor's Office (SAPO) since 28 July 2022. Klymenko worked for five years at the Ukrainian National Anti-Corruption Bureau of Ukraine (NABU), participating in investigations including those of Roman Nasirov and Oleksandr Onyshchenko. He was announced on 19 July 2022 as the winner of the head of SAPO competition, held in 2021, prior to his appointment to the position.

== Early life and education ==
Oleksandr Klymenko was born in the historical region of Slobozhanshchyna in September 1986.

He obtained a law degree at Yaroslav Mudryi National Law University.

== Detective ==
In 2010, Klymenko started working as an investigator in security organisations. In 2015, he was a senior investigator of property theft, working in the National Police of Ukraine.

Klymenko started work as a detective at the National Anti-Corruption Bureau of Ukraine (NABU) in March 2016. He was promoted to senior detective in 2017, and in November 2017 became head of department. At NABU, Klymenko participated in investigations against Oleh Tatarov, Roman Nasirov, Oleksandr Onyshchenko and Oleh Hladkovskyi.

== Head of SAPO ==
=== Competition ===
In 2021, a commission interviewed candidates for the head of the Ukrainian Specialized Anti-Corruption Prosecutor's Office (SAPO). Klymenko was supported unanimously by the commission following interviews on 3 June 2021, qualifying him for the second stage of the selection procedure. As of 28 July, along with Andrii Syniuk, who was also qualified in the first stage, Klymenko passed a "public integrity check". Klymenko received 212 points, Syniuk 195; no other candidates continued to qualify. Two stages of the competition remained to decide if Klymenko or Syniuk qualified as the head and deputy head of SAPO.

At its 10-hour long 21 December 2021 meeting, the commission awarded 246 points to Klymenko and 229 to Syniuk, without making a formal decision to select the competition winner. Among the 10-member commission, the five members who were Verkhovna Rada (Ukrainian parliament) members technically abstained, stating that Klymenko had not yet received security clearance for accessing classified material. The international members of the commission criticised the delay in approving Klymenko and Syniuk. The commission met on 24 December and again did not declare the winner of the competition.

=== Appointment ===
On 19 July 2022, the commission formally voted Klymenko as the winner of the competition. The Prosecutor General of Ukraine was required to appoint Klymenko as head of SAPO within three days of the announcement. On 28 July 2022, the newly elected Prosecutor General of Ukraine, Andriy Kostin, formally appointed Klymenko as head of SAPO.

=== Independence ===
In December 2021, Concorde Capital described Klymenko as having "proved his independence from Ukraine's power brokers".

== See also ==
- Corruption in Ukraine
- Ethics Council (Ukraine)
