= Artem Sytnyk =

Ukrainian lawyer and civil servant

- Артем Ситник
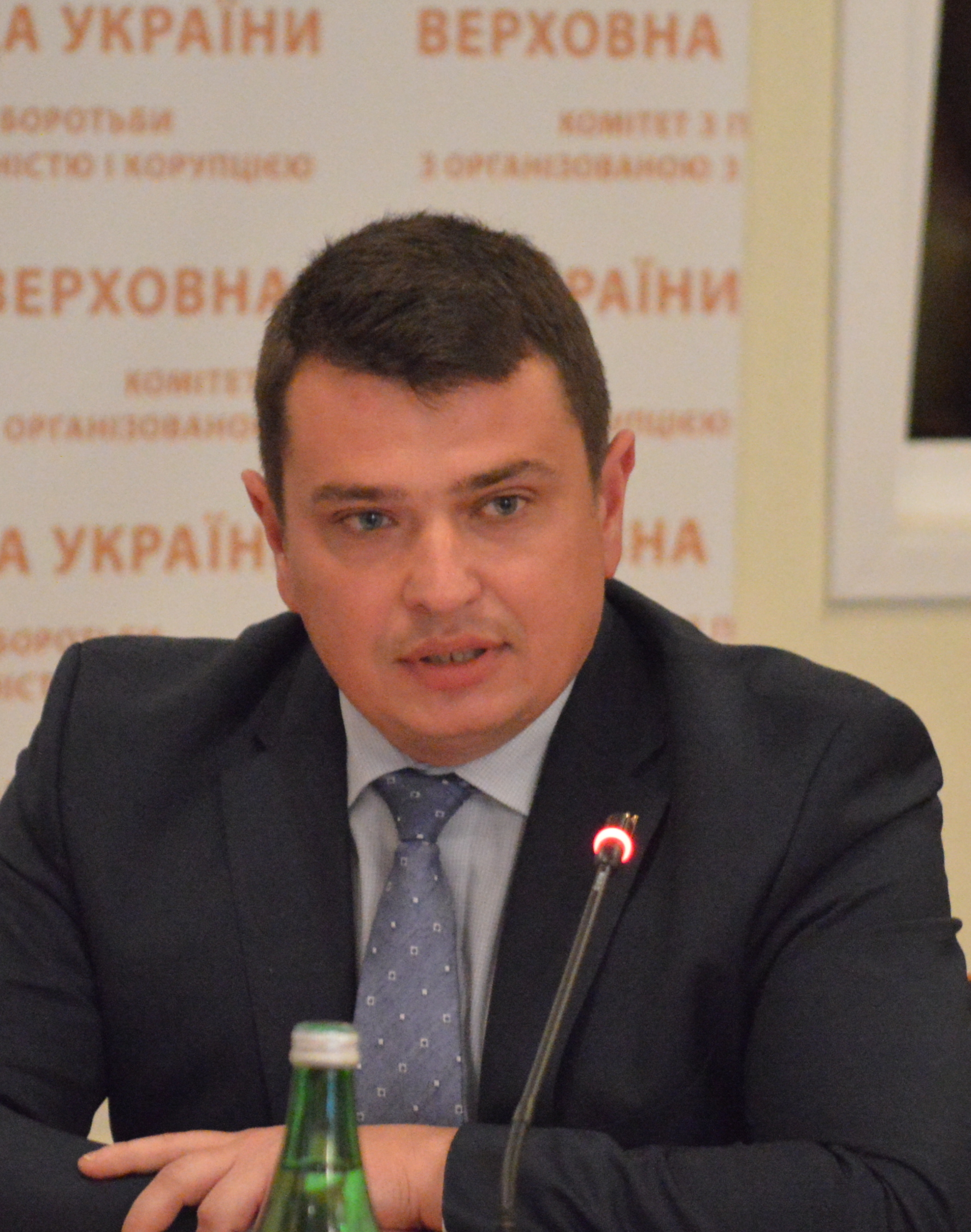

Deputy Director of Ukraine's Defence Procurement Agency (DPA)
- Incumbent
- Assumed office June 2024
- President: Volodymyr Zelenskyy
- Prime Minister: Denys Shmyhal

Deputy Head of the National Agency on Corruption Prevention
- In office May 12, 2022 – June 3, 2024
- President: Volodymyr Zelenskyy

First Director of the National Anti-Corruption Bureau of Ukraine
- In office April 16, 2015 – April 16, 2022
- President: Petro Poroshenko; Volodymyr Zelensky

Personal details
- Born: 19 August 1979 (age 47) Kompaniivka, Kirovohrad region, Ukrainian SSR, Soviet Union (now Ukraine)
- Party: Independent
- Occupation: lawyer, law enforcement officer, civil servant, politician

Artem Sytnyk (Ukrainian: Ситник Артем Сергійович; born August 19, 1979, Kompaniivka, Kirovohrad Oblast) is a Ukrainian lawyer, former prosecutor's investigator, first director of the National Anti-Corruption Bureau of Ukraine. (2015-2022), former deputy head of the National Agency on Corruption Prevention (May 12, 2022 - June 3, 2024), deputy director of Ukraine's Defence Procurement Agency (DPA) (since June 2024).

== Biography ==
Born on August 19, 1979, in Kompaniivka, Kirovohrad region.

=== Education ===
He graduated from high school in Kompaniivka with honors (gold medal). In 1996, he entered the Yaroslav Mudryi National Law Academy of Ukraine, where he studied law. In 2001, he graduated from the Academy with a diploma with honors.

=== Work in the investigation ===
In July 2001, he began his professional career as an Assistant Prosecutor at the Leninsky District Prosecutor's Office in Kirovohrad. In October of the same year, he was promoted to the position of Investigator.

In April 2004, he was appointed a Senior Investigator at the Kirovohrad Region Prosecutor's Office, and in October 2006, he headed the Investigative Department of the same prosecutor's office. From 2008 to 2011, he served as Head of the Investigative Unit of the Kyiv Region Prosecutor's Office.

Mr. Sytnyk investigated and/or led investigative teams in more than 300 criminal cases, many of which involved corruption. These cases included judges, employees of the Security Service of Ukraine, the Ministry of Internal Affairs, the Tax Police, the Customs Service, district administrations, and members of regional, city, and district councils. Additionally, he prosecuted election commission members for falsifying presidential election results.

In August 2011, he resigned from his position at his own request due to disagreement with the policies of the Yanukovych regime, including the criminalization of law enforcement agencies, curtailment of anti-corruption efforts, and unprofessional practices by the then Prosecutor of Kyiv Region.

From October 2011 to April 16, 2015[6], having successfully passed the bar exam, he practiced law. He headed the law firm “Yurydychni Garanty".

=== Director of NABU ===
In 2015, Sytnyk participated in the competition for the position of Director of the National Anti-Corruption Bureau of Ukraine (NABU), a new law enforcement agency created from scratch for the first time since Ukraine gained independence. The competition was conducted by an independent commission consisting of individuals with significant public authority from academic, human rights, and media communities. More than 150 applicants took part in the competition, which was held in several stages using the best international practices.

After winning the competition, Sytnyk was appointed to the position by a Presidential Decree on April 16, 2015.

The first task was to form the NABU team. This was also done through competitions involving the public. Given the huge public demand for the fight against corruption, NABU was established in a very short time. On September 30, 2015, NABU detectives were ready to register the first proceedings, but due to the failure to elect an anti-corruption prosecutor at that time, the first three criminal proceedings were registered on December 4, 2015, after the Specialized Anti-Corruption Prosecutor's Office received its Head.

Under Sytnyk’s leadership, NABU handled high-profile cases, including the detention of Interior Minister Arsen Avakov’s son, the arrest of State Fiscal Service head Roman Nasirov, and investigations into cases such as the Kuznya na Rybalskomu plant (owned by Poroshenko and Kononenko), the Rotterdam+ case against Ukrainian oligarch Rinat Akhmetov, and the case against Ihor Kolomoisky. Over seven years of Sytnyk's leadership, more than 800 individuals were prosecuted, including MPs, ministers, and other high-ranking officials.

On April 12, 2022, he was dismissed from his position as NABU Director upon the expiration of his term.

=== At the NACP ===
In 2022, he was appointed Deputy Head of the National Agency on Corruption Prevention (NACP). On June 3, 2024, he was dismissed from this position.

During his tenure, he introduced mechanisms for financial control over public officials' wealth, implemented lifestyle monitoring, and verified declarations using a new risk-based approach. Presented a plan to prevent corruption when men cross the border of Ukraine during martial law (was not approved by the government). His work led to the dismissal of Vsevolod Kniazev, Head of the Supreme Court of Ukraine, for bribery, and investigations into property statuses of over 100 military commissars, in particular, Odessa military commissar Yevgeny Borisov, assets confiscated to state revenue some MPs and other top officials. Automated verification of declarations and a new risk-based approach to their verification were also introduced.

=== At the Ministry of Defense of Ukraine ===
On June 21, 2024, Artem Sytnyk was appointed Deputy Director of the Defense Procurement Agency., a state-owned enterprise of the Ministry of Defense, where he is responsible for internal security, contractor verification, and proper execution of state contracts. He also focused on reducing intermediaries in arms procurement and developing anti-corruption procedures. Journalistic investigations of that period also confirmed the losses of the state budget due to the activities of special exporters.

== Civic position ==
In June 2018, he joined a campaign in support of Ukrainian filmmaker Sentsov, who was imprisoned in Russia.

== Family and personal life ==
His wife is Hanna Sytnyk, and they have two children.
