= Committee of the Verkhovna Rada on issues of budget =

- Committee of the Verkhovna Rada on issues of budget

Committee overview
- Formed: June 28, 1990
- Jurisdiction: Ukraine
- Employees: 27 deputies
- Committee executive: Andriy Pavlenko, Chairman
- Website: budget.rada.gov.ua

The Committee of the Verkhovna Rada of Ukraine on issues of budget (Ukrainian: Комітет Верховної Ради України з питань бюджету, Komitet Verkhovnoi Rady Ukrainy z pytan’ biudzhety) or simply, the Budget Committee (Ukrainian: Бюджетний комітет, Biudzhetnyi komitet) is a standing committee of the Verkhovna Rada, Ukraine's unicameral parliament. The committee is one of the largest in the parliament's 8th convocation, consisting of 27 people's deputies. Its entire composition was approved on December 4, 2014.

It was created on June 28, 1990 during the twelfth convocation of the Verkhovna Rada of the Ukrainian Soviet Socialist Republic (first convocation of the Verkhovna Rada of Ukraine) as the "Permanent Commission of the Verkhovna Rada of the Ukrainian SSR on issues of planning, budget, finances and prices" (Ukrainian: Комісія з питань планування, бюджету, фінансів і цін). The committee's first chairman was Andriy Pecherov.

== Presidium ==
On December 4, 2014, the Budget Committee's composition was approved by the Verkhovna Rada. Its presidium consists of six deputies:

Office	MP	Since	Party
Chairman	Andriy Pavelko	December 4, 2014	Petro Poroshenko Bloc
First Deputy Chairman	Vasyl Amelchenko	December 11, 2014	Radical Party of Oleh Lyashko
Deputy Chairman	Sergiy Melnyk	December 4, 2014	Independent
Deputy Chairman	Oleksiy Savchenko	December 4, 2014	Petro Poroshenko Bloc
Deputy Chairman	Viktor Kryvenko	December 4, 2014	Self Reliance
Secretary	Volodymyr Shkvarylyuk	December 4, 2014	Fatherland

== Scope ==
The Budget Committee's scope is to draft, prepare, and consider laws within the authority of the Verkhovna Rada, and to perform control functions in the following areas of its jurisdiction:

- state fiscal policy and intergovernmental relations;
- state budget of Ukraine (including issues of income, expenditures, and monitoring the implementation of the budget);
- budgeting;
- internal and external public debt;
- examination on the impact of bills, drafts of other acts on budget performance and compliance with laws governing fiscal relations;
- activities of public financial institutions;
- activities of the Accounting Chamber

== Subcommittees ==
The Budget Committee consists of the following subcommittees:

- Subcommittee on the evaluation of draft laws regarding the impact on the budget figures and compliance with budget legislation
- Subcommittee on the state budget revenues
- Subcommittee on the state debt and state budget financing
- Subcommittee on the state budget expenditures
- Subcommittee on the state budget social programs
- Subcommittee on the state budget investment programs
- Subcommittee on the local budgets
- Subcommittee on the state financial control and activity of the Accounting Chamber
- Subcommittee on the improving provisions of the Budget Code of Ukraine
- Subcommittee on the budget support of regional development
- Subcommittee on the budget policy
