= Oleksandr Tupytskyi =

Ukrainian official, lawyer and judge

- Олександр Тупицький
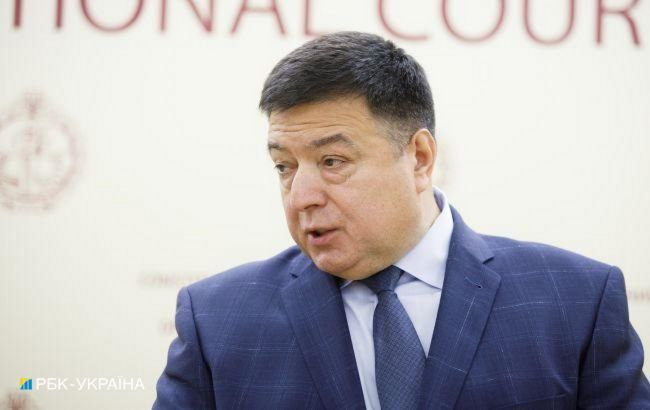
- Tupytskyi in 2021

12th Chairman of the Constitutional Court of Ukraine
- In office 17 September 2019 – 15 May 2022
- Preceded by: Nataliya Shapata
- Succeeded by: Serhiy Holovatyi (Acting)

Judge of the Constitutional Court of Ukraine
- In office 19 May 2013 – 15 May 2022
- Nominated by: Viktor Yanukovych

Personal details
- Born: Oleksandr Mykolayovych Tupytskyi; 28 January 1963 (age 63) Biloziria, Ukrainian SSR, Soviet Union

Oleksandr Mykolayovych Tupytskyi (Ukrainian: Олександр Миколайович Тупицький; born 28 January 1963) is a Ukrainian former official, lawyer, and judge who had been the 12th chairman of the Constitutional Court of Ukraine from 2019 to 2022.

On 29 December 2020, President of Ukraine Volodymyr Zelenskyy removed Tupytskyi from the post of Chairman of the Constitutional Court for a period of two months, but the Constitutional Court ruled the decision of the President illegal and refused to comply with the decree. The suspension was extended for a period of one month by the Decree of the President of Ukraine. At the same time, together with his wife, he has been under US visa sanctions in connection with "significant acts of corruption" and "receiving a monetary bribe while working in the Ukrainian judicial system.".

On 14 May 2013, he was appointed a judge of the Constitutional Court of Ukraine by President Viktor Yanukovych.

He had been the deputy chairman of the Constitutional Court of Ukraine to 2018 to 2019.

He is a candidate of sciences in public administration as of 2009.

== Biography ==
Oleksandr Tupytskyi was born in Biloziria, Ukraine on 28 January 1963.

After finishing school, he did military service. He worked as a milling machine at the Smila radio equipment factory and the Strommashina factory in Cherkasy.

He graduated from the Kharkov Law Institute. F. E. Dzerzhinsky with a degree in law in 1988. From 1988 to 1993, he was an intern at the Prosecutor's Office of Donetsk, then investigator, then promoted to senior investigator of the Prosecutor's Office of the Kuibyshev district of the city. Between 1993 and 2010, he became the judge of the Kuibyshevsky district court of Donetsk. In 2002, he became the chairman of that court. During that time, he was a member of the qualification and disciplinary commission of the bar of the Donetsk Oblast and a member of the Council of Judges of the Donetsk Oblast.

In 2006, he studied in the United States under the "Open World" program.

He is a candidate of Sciences in Public Administration with a degree in Public Administration Mechanisms as of 2009, where he defended his thesis for the degree of candidate of sciences in public administration on the topic "State mechanism for improving the quality of professional training of judges" with the specialty 25.00.02 "Mechanisms of public administration" at the Donetsk State University of Administration.

In 2010 to 2013, he was elected and worked as a judge in the Donetsk, Lviv, and Dnipropetrovsk Courts of Appeal. He served as chairman of the Lviv and Dnipropetrovsk Courts of Appeal.

On 14 May 2013, by Decree No. 256/2013, Tupytskyi was appointed a judge of the Constitutional Court of Ukraine. He took the oath on 15 May.

From 2018 to 2019, he was the deputy chairman. On 17 September 2019, at a special plenary session of the Constitutional Court of Ukraine, Tupytskyi was elected as the Chairman of the Constitutional Court for a term of three years.

On 29 October 2020, under the chairmanship of Tupytskyi, the Constitutional Court of Ukraine recognized a significant part of the anti-corruption reform in Ukraine as unconstitutional. The decision was harshly criticized by Ukrainian and international politicians, experts and journalists, seeing it as an attack on the fight against corruption in Ukraine. On 7 November 2020, activists of the NGO "Anti-Corruption Center" came to his house in Vasylkiv, registered as his mother-in-law, and, after clashes with the police, installed a gallows near the fence.

In December 2020, President Zelenskyy announced that Tupytskyi could not remain in office and should resign.

On 20 December, Zelenskyy signed a decree on the suspension of Tupytskyi for two months from the post of judge of the Constitutional Court of Ukraine, based on a request from the Prosecutor General's Office. The next day, the Constitutional Court declared that by doing so, "Zelensky went beyond the limits of his constitutional powers, violating the Constitution."

The Office of the President of Ukraine called this statement "legally void", the General Prosecutor's Office stated that the President suspended Tupytskyi in accordance with the requirements of the law, and the position of the Constitutional Court of Ukraine was unfounded.

On 19 January 2021 employees of the State Security Department did not allow Tupytskyi to enter the Constitutional Court of Ukraine and his office, after which he called the police and wrote a statement about "obstructing him in the performance of official duties." On 28 January, Tupytsky filed a lawsuit at the District Administrative Court of Kyiv, demanding to "recognize the actions of the State Security Department as illegal" and to oblige the UDO to "refrain from preventing him from accessing the territory of the Constitutional Court."

On 1 February, Zelenskyy's decree on Tupytskyi's removal from office was challenged in the Supreme Court of Ukraine, but on 3 February, the Supreme Court decided to refuse to open proceedings.

On 8 February, the court refused to enforce the claim, as it concluded that there were no legal grounds for this.

On 26 February, by President Zelenskyy's decree, Tupytskyi was again removed from the position of judge of the Constitutional Court for one month starting from 28 February 2021.

On 17 March 2021, the Constitutional Court of Ukraine was supposed to hold a special plenary meeting to consider the issue of Tupytskyi's suspension, but it did not take place because Tupytskyi himself was not allowed to enter the courthouse.

On 27 March, Zelenskyy signed a decree canceling President Yanukovych's 2013 decrees on the appointment of Oleksandr Tupytskyi and Oleksandr Kasminin as judges of the Constitutional Court. Thus, Tupytskyi and Kasminin were deprived of their powers as judges of the Constitutional Court and chairman of the court. Subsequently, the Representative of the President of Ukraine at the Constitutional Court Fedir Venislavskyi explained that in this way they also lost the status of a judge (of general jurisdiction) and the right to life insurance as a judge of the Constitutional Court. Venislavskyi advised all those who disagree with the decision to appeal to the Supreme Court or the Constitutional Court of Ukraine, as only they can challenge the president's decree.

On 8 April the Constitutional Court of Ukraine received a constitutional submission from a group of 49 people's deputies regarding the unconstitutionality of the decree of the President of Ukraine on the cancellation of the decrees appointing Tupytskyi and Kasminin to the positions of judges of the Constitutional Court.

The European Solidarity party explained the appeal to the Constitutional Court of Ukraine with the intention to prevent the "usurpation of power" by Zelenskyy.

On 1 July 2021, Tupytskyi filed a lawsuit against the Constitutional Court with a demand to award more than ₴900,000 in judges' salaries. In the lawsuit, he demanded that the Constitutional Court's inaction regarding the non-payment of wages in the period from 18 April to 28 August 2020 be recognized as illegal.

On 16 August, the President's Office contested Tupytskyi's reinstatement as a judge of the Constitutional Court. The renewal became possible after the Supreme Court annulled President Zelenskyy's decree on the release of Tupytskyi.

On 9 December 2021, the US Treasury Department added Tupytskyi, along with the former deputy head of President Yanukovych's Administration Andriy Portnov, to the sanctions list, accusing him of using influence to make custom decisions in courts and undermining the reform of the judicial system.

He terminated his powers as a judge of the Constitutional Court of Ukraine on 15 May 2022 due to the expiration of his term of office.

On 23 August 2022, Tupytskyi is declared wanted.

== Investigation ==
In December 2020, the "Schemes" program published a recording of Tupytskyi's conversation about involvement in referee fraud and receiving bribes, conducted by the SBU.

Tupytsky convinced the witness not to testify to the law enforcement officers and talked about business schemes in which he was probably involved.

Data were also made public that Tupytskyi bought and did not declare land in Crimea, temporarily occupied by Russia, which he became the owner of in 2018 under Russian laws, confirmation was received from Russia. Tupytskyi explained this by the fact that he "doesn't know how" to declare it, citing it as the Russian occupation of Crimea.

On 19 January 2021, the SBI notified Tupytsky of suspicion of crimes under Part 2 of Article 384, Article 386 of the Criminal Code (knownly false testimony combined with artificial creation of defense evidence, bribing a witness to refuse to testify).

On 1 March, the SBI initiated a criminal case against Tupytskyi on self-rights.

On 26 March the Chairman of the NAKC, Oleksandr Novikov, drew up a protocol regarding Tupytskyi, because he canceled the meeting of the Constitutional Court, which was supposed to consider the appeal of the State Bureau of Investigation about his commission of a misdemeanor. The protocol was drawn up based on the fact of "failure to report the existence of a real conflict of interest". The deputy head of the Constitutional Court, Serhiy Holovaty, convened a plenary session of the court, but Tupytskyi, according to the NAKC, "illegally issued an order canceling the previously issued order."

In July 2021, the SBI reported that it was investigating Tupytskyi for involvement in two more criminal offenses — in particular, regarding the possible arbitrary assignment of power and interference in the automated distribution of court cases. The investigation is taking place at the request of the president's representative in the Venislavskyi Constitutional Court.

On 8 November 2021, the SBI sent a case to the court accusing Tupytskyi of unauthorized interference in the work of the automated system "Treasury Client - Treasury". According to the investigators, during 12/29/2020-02/9/2021, the chief accountant of the Constitutional Court illegally signed 207 documents on behalf of Tupytskyi, as well as signed electronic payment instructions for the payment of the judge's remuneration, wages to employees of the Constitutional Court Secretariat, along with bonuses, assistance, allowances and other payments.

== Other scandals ==
On 10 January 2021 the publication "Censor.net" published a report about Tupytskyi's vacation at the royal villa in Dubai, the cost of which is over ₴300,000 per day.

On 12 January he Constitutional Court confirmed that Tupytskyi with his wife and son were on vacation in the United Arab Emirates, but stated that the cost of the vacation was lower. The court apparatus also reported that Tupytskyi's income for 2020 amounted to ₴3.71 million.

== Scientific achievements ==
He has publications on state mechanisms to improve the quality of professional training of judges, economic law, and problematic issues of constitutional justice. He was a participant of international conferences and professional meetings.
