= Oleksandr Novikov =

Ukrainian politician and law enforcement officer (born 1982)

- Олександр Новіков

Head of the National Agency on Corruption Prevention (NACP)
- In office January 15, 2020 – February 27, 2024
- President: Volodymyr Zelenskyy
- Prime Minister: Oleksiy Honcharuk, Denys Shmyhal
- Preceded by: Natalia Korchak
- Succeeded by: Viktor Pavlushchyk

Personal details
- Born: 6 March 1982 (age 44) Sumy, Ukrainian SSR, Soviet Union (now Sumy, Ukraine)
- Education: Yaroslav Mudryi National Law University (law); Kyiv-Mohyla Business School (KMBS)
- Occupation: Politician; law enforcement officer

Oleksandr Novikov (Ukrainian: Олександр Федорович Новіков; born March 6, 1982, Sumy) is a Ukrainian politician and law enforcement officer, former Head of the National Agency on Corruption Prevention (NACP) from 2020 to 2024, former prosecutor since 2004, including at the Office of the Prosecutor General from 2012 to 2020.

== Biography ==
Novikov was born on March 6, 1982, in Sumy. Has a higher legal education. He worked in prosecution for more than 16 years (from 2004 to 2020), supervised the observance and application of laws by all types of state and local self-government bodies, supported the state prosecution in cases of combating organized crime, cybercrime and economic crimes.

In December 2019, Novikov was elected Head of the National Agency on Corruption Prevention (NACP) at an open competition. This was the first competition for the position of the Head of the central executive body, where international experts had the decisive vote in the commission of 6 people (Vitaly Shabunin, Kateryna Ryzhenko, Olga Kobylynska, Tilman Hoppe, Goran Klymenych, Michael Sears) in accordance with the provisions of Article 6 of the Law of Ukraine " On prevention of corruption".

== Education ==
- 2021-2022 – Kyiv-Mohyla Business School (KMBS).
- 2003-2004 – studied at the National Prosecution academy of Ukraine
- 1999-2004 – studied at the Yaroslav Mudryi National Law University, majoring in "law" .
- He also studied abroad (ILEA Budapest – International Law Enforcement Academy, 2015 ; NATO School Oberammergau, 2022), in particular, he underwent international training on the deanonymization of financial transactions, including Bitcoin.

== Professional activity ==
Since January 15, 2020 — Head of the National Agency on Corruption Prevention.

2014-2020 — Prosecutor of the Unit of Procedural Management of Pretrial Investigations and Support of State Prosecution, Department of Law Enforcement Supervision by Bodies Fighting Organized Crime, Department of Law Enforcement Supervision in Criminal Proceedings and Coordination of Law Enforcement Activities of the General Prosecutor's Office of Ukraine.

In 2019, he successfully passed the certification of prosecutors.

2012-2014 — Prosecutor of the Unit of Protection of Financial and Economic Interests of the State of the General Prosecutor's Office of Ukraine.

2011-2012 — prosecutor of the Unit of Supervision of Compliance with Laws by Internal Affairs Bodies during Inquiry and Pretrial Investigation of the Sumy Oblast Prosecutor's Office.

2007-2011 — Prosecutor of the Unit of Protection of Constitutional Rights and Freedoms of Citizens and State Interests of the Sumy Oblast Prosecutor's Office.

2004-2007 — investigator and assistant prosecutor of the Prosecutor's Office of Sumy.

During his work as a prosecutor of the Unit for the Protection of Financial and Economic Interests of the State of the Prosecutor General's Office of Ukraine, he registered 21 criminal proceedings with losses exceeding ₴1.5 billion.

He also sent 18 submissions, four of which to the Prime Minister of Ukraine. According to these submissions, 42 illegal acts of the central executive authorities and the Government were revoked.

In 2015, Oleksandr Novikov was a candidate for the position of first deputy Head of the Specialized Anti-Corruption Prosecutor's Office (SAPO). At that time, the commission proposed to appoint him as one of the three candidates for deputy Head of the SAPO.

Since 2020, he Heads the delegation of Ukraine to participate in the work of the Group of States against Corruption (GRECO) is the Council of Europe anti-corruption body.

By order of the President of Ukraine, he was appointed as the Head of the delegation of Ukraine to participate in the 9th session of the Conference of States Parties to the United Nations Convention against Corruption.

== Resonant cases ==
- In 2016 and 2018, he sent indictments to the court against a criminal organization that falsified 2,000 External independent evaluation test results in the Ukrainian Center for the Evaluation of the Quality of Education in the interests of the Administration of the President of Ukraine, the Verkhovna Rada and the Government, and also embezzled funds from the American Councils on International Education (2008-2015).
- Oleksandr Novikov also registered the proceedings, according to which an indictment was sent to the court against the Minister of Justice Oleksandr Lavrynovych, who embezzled $1.1 million, having purchased the services of the firm Skadden, Arps Slate Meagher & Flom LLP and Affiliates under the guise of legal assistance in the case "Tymoshenko v. Ukraine", the consideration of which by the European Court of Human Rights was completed at the time of purchase.

== Open competition for the position of the Head of the NACP ==
On October 2, 2019, the Verkhovna Rada of Ukraine adopted a law that changed the management model of the NACP from a collegial to a one-person.

The competition for the position of the Head of the NACP started on November 8, 2019. The commission was Headed by the Head of the legal department of Transparency International Ukraine, Kateryna Ryzhenko, and international expert Tilman Hoppe.

30 people applied for the position of the Head of the NACP. Subsequently, the commission selected 8 candidates based on the results of the first stage of evaluation.

On January 15, 2020, the Cabinet of Ministers of Ukraine by its Resolutionappointed Oleksandr Novikov as the new Head of the NACP.

== Activities of NACP ==
Since the beginning of the full-scale invasion of the Russian Federation against Ukraine on February 24, 2022, access to the public part of the Register of Declarations, the POLITDATA Register of party reports and the Register of Corrupt Officials has been restricted to protect the personal data of declarants, parties and other users under martial law.

In March 2022, Oleksandr Novikov sent a letter of thanks to the Minister of Defense of the Russian Federation, Sergei Shoigu. In the letter, the Head of the NACP expresses his gratitude "for the invaluable contribution to the fact that Russian means and resources for the attack on Ukraine were stolen even at the stage of their accumulation on the border".

On February 27, 2024 the Shmyhal Government formally appointed Viktor Pavlushchyk as the new head of the National Agency on Corruption Prevention (NACP).

== See also ==
- Honcharuk Government
- Shmyhal Government
