= European Union Anti-Corruption Initiative in Ukraine =

Technical assistance in fighting corruption by the EU and Denmark in Ukraine

The European Union Anti-Corruption Initiative
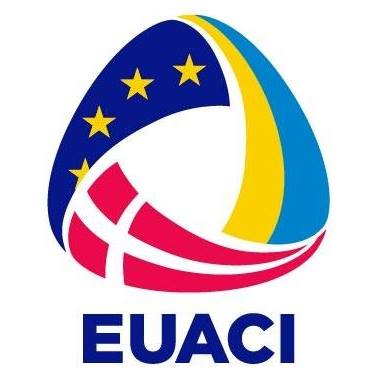
- Founded: 2017
- Purpose: Counteraction of Corruption in Ukraine
- Origins: Kyiv, Ukraine
- Region served: Ukraine
- Key people: Eka Tkeshelashvili
- Website: EUACI.eu

The European Union Anti-Corruption Initiative, EUACI, is the largest program of technical assistance in fighting corruption in Ukraine implemented by the European Union.

The program was established in June 2017 and was expected to run for three years (2017–2019). It was mainly funded by the European Commission and co-funded by Danish International Development Agency. In 2021, the European Court of Auditors found the EU support for reforms in Ukraine to be ineffective in fighting grand corruption.

== Mission and Aims ==
The European Union Anti-Corruption Initiative EUACI in Ukraine was created to strengthen the capability of the anti-corruption institutions and increasing parliamentary, civic society and media control over the reforms in Ukraine.

The aims of the program were as follows:

- improvement of anti-corruption politics implementation
- facilitation of reduction in large scale corruption
- strengthening of operational and legislative potential of state institutions in prevention and elimination of corruption
- increase of parliamentary supervision of reforms, and potential of studying and improving the strategic legislative basis
- increase of the potential of local governments, public and media which would enable them to contribute towards anti-corruption activities

== Funding ==
The overall budget of the program was 15.84 million euros. The immediate executor of the program representing the Kingdom of Denmark was DANIDA. The project was implemented as international technical aid, according to Contract No 3582–01 from 15 March 2017, under the Framework Agreement between Ukraine and European Commission (ratified together with the notice under the Law 360–VI (360–17) from 3 September 2008). It became the first large scale project aimed at fighting corruption.

== Implementation ==
The program was expected to be implemented over a period of 3 years, between 15 December 2016 – 14 December 2019. It comprised three components:

1. Support of state agencies dealing with the prevention and fight against corruption.
2. The assistance to Ukrainian parliament implementation of anti-corruption reforms.
3. The assistance for local government, civil society, and media of anti-corruption activities (integrity cities, civil society organisations, investigative journalists).

=== Component 1 Support of state agencies ===
EUACI provided consultative, organisational and financial assistance to the special anti-corruption institutions in the following 8 projects:

- IT equipment for The Asset Recovery and Management Agency of Ukraine
- Technical support for the Regional Press Development Institute
- Analysis of the business processes used for the electronic tax declarations

This analysis includes identification of problems and development of measures allowing to make necessary improvements in the business processes used for the tax declaration evaluation. The project was delivered together with the National Anti-Corruption Bureau of Ukraine (in October 2017).

- Creation of a learning working group led by Eric Heldna (the length of this project was half a year)
- Assistance in typological research allowing to discover new trends and schemes in money laundering and financing of terrorism (the project was carried out by the State Financial Monitoring Service of Ukraine)
- A learning visit to Lithuania for the SAPO and NABU employees (28–29 August 2017)
- A visit of the NABU delegation to the Eurojust in The Hague, Netherlands (14–15 March 2018)
- NABU professionals attended studies in Vilnius, Lithuania (19–21 March 2018).

=== Component 2 assistance to Ukrainian parliament ===
Implemented projects:

- Creation of International Anti-Corruption Advisory Board (IACAB)

The IACAB was created on 8 September 2017 as a result of the a Letter of Intent being signed between the Verkhovna Rada Anti-Corruption Committee and EUACI.

It consists of the following members: Carlos Castresana, Anca Jurma, Giovanni Kessler, Drago Kos, Jesper Hjortenberg, Daniel Thelesklaf.

IACAB professionals perform analysis of anti-corruption efforts in Ukraine in the areas of investigation, criminal persecution and court consideration of high-profile corruption cases. The experts create reports based on the results of their analysis and provide recommendations to improve the efficiency of Ukrainian anti-corruption institutions.

=== Component 3 assisting local government, civil society, and media ===
Implemented projects:

- Financial support for the project "Local Community Engagement in Anti-Corruption Advocacy Programs with the Assistance of Civic Anti-Corruption Investigations, Supervision and Civic Education". The project is expected to last for one year and will be implemented by the "School of Civic Education" which was created by the civic organisation "Stop Corruption", the Institute of Civic Education "Kyiv Mohyla Academy" and ACREC (Anti-Corruption Research and Education Centre). During a year a series of training sessions for the activists of "Stop Corruption" will take place; an anti-corruption research and campaign will be carried out in a number of cities.
  - 26–28 January 2018 – the first module of the "School of Civic Education"
  - 16–18 March 2018 – the second module of the "School of Civic Education"
- Support for journalist investigations
  - Grant competition for anti-corruption investigations (October – November 2017)
  - Support for a 5-day data journalism school (10–14 October 2017)
  - Support for the 9th Conference of Investigative Journalism (8–9 December 2017)
  - Training sessions for journalists: "Technologies of Journalist Investigations" (Kharkiv, 23–27 September 2017), "Journalist Investigations of Corruption and Malpractice in Communal Enterprise" (Kyiv, 17–18 December 2017), "New Investigators – the School for Regional Journalists" (Kyiv, 27–31 January 2018), "The Correct Ways of Reading Legal Documents" (Kyiv, 16 March 2018), "Video Storytelling: Create a Story the World Will Understand" (Kyiv, 30 March – 1 April 2018)
- Collaboration with "Integrity Cities" – an anti-corruption program that is planned to be implemented in 6 cities of Ukraine

In a number of selected cities the analysis of corruption risks will be performed, the ways of their elimination will be identified, and anti-corruption tools will be created and implemented. The agreement has been reached and a letter of intent has been signed for cooperation with Chernivtsi.

- The Corruption Park

On 1 June 2018, the Corruption Park hosted by the EUACI was opened in Kyiv. This is the first project of this kind in Ukraine. The aim of the Corruption Park is to expand knowledge about corruption as a mischief, to youth and children mainly.
It is an interactive park that uses images, virtual reality, 3D technologies, touchscreens and installations to explain not only what corruption is but also what is done to eradicate it in Ukraine.
The park comprises nine inflatable tents, total square is 700 sq. m. Each tent exhibits the various aspects of the top corruption and shows its influence on the lives of regular people.
Additionally, an anti-lecture hall works here, film screenings and activities for children take place.

== Team ==
As of 2018, EUACI included both Ukrainian and foreign professionals:

- Eka Tkeshelashvili – Head of programme
- Elena Konceviciute – Senior anti-corruption advisor
- Barbara James – Head of administration
- Clemence Muller – Senior anti-corruption advisor
- Bogdan Boyko – Civil society and local governance expert
- Serhiy Derkach – Anti-corruption investigation and prosecution expert
- Halyna Kokhan – Anti-corruption and prevention expert
- Vitaliy Veselskiy – Information technology expert
- Katerina Bazayants – Finance and administration manager
- Anastasiia Shevkoplyas – Programme Administrative Associate
- Volodymyr Solohub – Communications expert

A Steering Committee was established in order to enable common decision making for implementation of anti-corruption initiatives between the Kingdom of Denmark, EU mission in Ukraine and main institutional beneficiaries. As of 2018, the members of the Steering Committee of the Anti-Corruption Initiative of the European Union in Ukraine were as follows:

- A Minister from the Cabinet of Ministers of Ukraine
- National Agency on Corruption Prevention
- National Anti-Corruption Bureau of Ukraine
- State Financial Monitoring Service of Ukraine
- Asset Recovery and Management Agency of Ukraine
- Specialized Anti-Corruption Prosecutor's Office
- Verkhovna Rada Anti-Corruption Committee
- Institute of Regional Press Development
- Mayors of "Integrity Cities"
- Ambassador of the Kingdom of Denmark in Ukraine
- Designated Official from European Union mission in Ukraine

== See also ==
- 2020–2022 Ukrainian constitutional crisis
- Civil Oversight Council of the National Anti-corruption Bureau of Ukraine
- Corruption in Ukraine
- High Anti-Corruption Court of Ukraine – Ukrainian court concerning corruption in Ukraine
- List of anti-corruption agencies
- National Agency on Corruption Prevention – Ukrainian government agency
- National Anti-Corruption Bureau of Ukraine – Ukrainian watchdog agency
