= Special Operations Department of the National Anti-Corruption Bureau of Ukraine =

National Anti-Corruption Bureau of Ukraine Special Operations Department
- Управління спеціальних операцій НАБУ
- Founded: 2015
- Country: Ukraine
- Branch: National Anti-Corruption Bureau of Ukraine
- Type: Special Forces
- Role: Anti-corruption, special operations
- Size: Battalion
- Engagements: Russo-Ukrainian War; War in Donbass; Russian invasion of Ukraine; Battle of Kharkiv; 2022 Kherson counteroffensive; Battle of Bakhmut; 2024 Kharkiv offensive

The National Anti-Corruption Bureau of Ukraine Special Operations Department is the special forces and special operations wing of the National Anti-Corruption Bureau of Ukraine, the chief Anti-corruption governmental body of Ukraine. It is tasked with special operations, raids, counterinsurgency operations and other related tasks. During wartime, the department has also taken part in hostilities being involved in both the War in Donbass and the Russian invasion of Ukraine.

== History ==
In October 2014, the National Anti-Corruption Bureau of Ukraine was established as an Anti-corruption governmental body and with its establishment, a Special Operations Department was formed within its structure, tasked with special operations, raids, countering urgency operations and even direct combat during war.

On 30 September 2015, NABU Special Operations Department held physical fitness tests for its personnel including physical exercises, hand-to-hand combat and sparring techniques. On 28 October 2015, during a joint Ukraine-NATO working group meeting, the chief of the National Anti-Corruption Bureau of Ukraine Artem Sytynk asked NATO to equip and train the NABU Special Operations Department including the provision of non-lethal equipment including helmets, body armor, uniforms and other equipment, to which NATO agreed to provide assistance. In May 2016, it was trained by the personnel from FBI. As of June 2016, the NABU Special Operations Department had conducted more than 150 successful anti-corruption special operations including one 29 in March 2016, when a judge of the Malinovsky District Court of Odessa, opened fire on them during an attempted detainment for him taking a bribe of 500,000 hryvnias, he fled but was later captured. In October 2016, it received clearance operations training from FBI SWAT teams. During the 2016 Dynamo marksmen competition, NABU Special Operations Department's personnel individually won the 1st and 2nd prizes while the team as a whole won the 2nd place.

Following the Russian invasion of Ukraine, it saw combat. During the first hundred days of the war, NABU Special Operations Department personnel conducted demining operations in Horkyi and Sarzhyn Yar parks in Kharkiv. On 8 September 2022, Major Ivan Gvozdev, an officer of the NABU Special Operations Department was killed in action in Mykolaiv Oblast during the 2022 Kherson counteroffensive. On 24 October 2022, Major Taras Pona, an officer of the NABU Special Operations Department was killed in combat during the Battle of Bakhmut. As of November 2024, it was seeing combat during the 2024 Kursk offensive.

== Equipment ==
Model	Image	Origin	Type	Number	Notes
Vehicles
BMP-3		Soviet Union	Infantry Fighting Vehicle	3	
Ford Transit Custom		Germany	Mid-sized, front wheel drive van	2 Ford Custom Tourneo LWB Trend, 1 Ford Custom Tourneo SWB Titanium	
Ford Kuga		United States	Compact crossover SUV	3 Ford Kuga Ambients	
Ford Mondeo		United States	Mid-size/large car	2 Ford Mondeo Trends	
