= Ukraine and the International Monetary Fund =

Ukraine has been a member of the International Monetary Fund (IMF) and the World Bank since 3 September, 1992. The country is one of the IMF's four largest borrowers.

== History ==
=== Independence–Yanukovych ===
Ukraine became a member of the IMF and the World Bank on 3 September, 1992. The IMF approved a $2.2 billion Extended Fund Facility (EFF) with Ukraine in September 1998. In July 1999, the three-year program was increased to $2.6 billion. Ukraine's failure to meet monetary targets and structural-reform commitments caused the EFF to be suspended or its disbursements delayed several times. The last EFF disbursement was made in September 2001. Although Ukraine met most monetary targets for the EFF disbursement which was due in early 2002, the tranche was not disbursed due to the accumulation of large VAT-refund arrears to Ukrainian exporters (which amounted to a hidden budget deficit). The EFF expired in September 2002, and the government of Ukraine and the IMF began discussions the following month on the possibility and form of future programs.

The IMF granted Ukraine a $16.4 billion loan in October 2008, of which the government had received $10.6 billion in May 2010. Further payments were frozen in late 2009, after Ukraine raised minimum wages and pensions contrary to IMF recommendations.

Ukraine was the IMF's third-largest borrower in May 2010, after Romania ($12.5 billion) and Hungary ($11.6 billion). The IMF approved a 29-month, $15.15 billion loan to Ukraine on 28 July, 2010. Among other effects, this led to a 50-percent increase on household natural gas utility prices in July 2010 for Ukrainian consumers (a key demand of the IMF in exchange of the loan). The Fund said on 20 December, 2013, that the second Azarov government had only partially implemented the 2010 agreements, "and in this connection the program had not been implemented".

In December 2013, Ukrainian Prime Minister Mykola Azarov noted "the extremely harsh conditions" of a renewed IMF loan presented by the Fund on 20 November of that year. The conditions, which included steep budget cuts and a 40-percent increase in natural-gas bills, were the last argument supporting the Ukrainian government's decision to suspend preparations to sign the Ukraine–European Union Association Agreement on 21 November, 2013. The decision to postpone signing the agreement led to the Euromaidan protests. (Note: The economic portion of the agreement was signed on 21 March, 2014, and the remainder was signed on 27 June of that year.) On 7 December, 2013, the IMF clarified that it was not insisting on a 40-percent single-stage increase in natural-gas tariffs; the Fund recommended a gradual increase to an economically-justified level, with compensation to the poor in the form of increased social assistance. On 10 December, 2013, Ukrainian president Viktor Yanukovych said: "We will certainly resume the IMF negotiations. If there are conditions that suit us, we will take that path". However, Yanukovych repeated that the IMF conditions were unacceptable: "I had a conversation with U.S. Vice President Joe Biden, who told me that the issue of the IMF loan has almost been solved, but I told him that if the conditions remained ... we did not need such loans". In December 2013, Ukraine again applied to the IMF for about $20 billion to meet the costs associated with signing the Ukraine–European Union Association Agreement.

=== Post-Maidan ===
In February 2014, Yanukovych and Azarov were overthrown and replaced by the first Yatsenyuk government. The following month, the IMF required Ukraine to reform its natural-gas price subsidies in return for an aid package of about $15 billion. One of the expected effects was a 50-percent price increase for natural gas sold to domestic consumers. The increase was expected to become effective on 1 May as part of a set of intertwined contingencies required by the IMF to provide financial support to Ukraine. The European Union required Ukraine to secure the IMF aid package in return for about €1.6 billion in EU support. Before the increase, all natural gas bought by the government of Ukraine was resold to consumers with government subsidies at below-market prices. Gas prices for district heating companies were also expected to rise by 40 percent on 1 July. Anders Aslund, a former economic adviser to the Ukrainian government, believed that Ukraine's expenses could be reduced by two percent of its gross domestic product if gas subsidies were halted. On 27 March, 2014, the IMF announced that it would issue a $14-18 billion rescue package for Ukraine; in return, the Fund demanded that Ukraine establish an anti-corruption bureau. The previous day, Ukraine announced that household natural-gas prices would rise by 50 percent on 1 May, 2014. On 4 September of that year, Ukraine received $1.39 billion from the IMF.

On 11 March, 2015, the Fund approved a four-year, $17.5 billion EFF for Ukraine; its first tranche of $5 billion was forwarded on 13 March, 2015. The second $1.7 billion tranche was transferred on 4 August, 2015. The third tranche would be released after a review of the EFF, in which the IMF wanted to see a decrease in corruption. The third, $1 billion tranche was agreed to be forwarded on 15 September, 2016, despite Russian opposition. Russia opposed the decision because, since December 2015, Ukraine had defaulted on a $3 billion debt payment to Russia. The fourth tranche was forwarded in spring 2017. Because of a 2017 memorandum between Ukraine and the IMF, only pension reform was achieved and the country received no further financing from the Fund.

On 21–29 May, 2019, an IMF mission led by Ron van Rooden visited Kyiv to discuss recent developments and economic policies regarding the Fund. At the end of the visit, it concluded: "The IMF staff team has had very productive discussions with the Ukrainian authorities, including with President Zelenskyi, on the review of Ukraine’s Stand-By Arrangement with the IMF. The team has found that fiscal and monetary policies remain on track, and it stands ready to return to Kyiv to continue discussions after the forthcoming parliamentary elections as soon as a new government has clarified its policy intentions".

In late September 2019, an IMF mission left Ukraine without securing a new deal. The 2019 Ukrainian parliamentary elections had taken place, and the Honcharuk government (led by Oleksiy Honcharuk) had been formed on 29 August. After the September visit, the IMF said: "Growth is held back by a weak business environment—with shortcomings in the legal framework, pervasive corruption, and large parts of the economy dominated by inefficient state-owned enterprises or by oligarchs—deterring competition and investment". In mid-October 2019, a Ukrainian delegation visited Washington to continue talks with the IMF about a new lending program.

On 10 June, 2020, IMF's executive board has approved an 18-month, $5 billion standby arrangement for Ukraine. Ukraine immediately received about $2 billion, while the remaining amount is planned to be disbursed in phases over four reviews during an 18-month period. In order to qualify for the loan deal Ukraine's parliament had voted to lift a ban on the sale of farmland and approved a new banking law (which was designed to prevent Ihor Kolomoiskyi and Hennadii Boholiubov from regaining control of PrivatBank).

In November 2025, the IMF and Ukraine reached a deal on a four-year Extended Fund Facility (EFF) worth approximately $8.2 billion. The deal was reached following amid attempts to reach stability in the region, and Ukraine's damaged economy as a result.

=== 2022 Russian invasion of Ukraine ===
On 5 March, 2022, the IMF said it anticipated to forward Ukraine's request for $1.4 billion in emergency finance to its board for approval as soon as next week.

In 2026, Ukraine was seeking a four-year $8.1 billion Extended Fund Facility loan from the IMF.

== See also ==
- Economy of Ukraine
