= National Agency on Corruption Prevention =

Ukrainian government agency

Agency overview
- Formed: 2016
- Jurisdiction: Government of Ukraine
- Headquarters: 28 Mykoly Mikhnovskoho Boulevard, Kyiv
- Agency executive: Viktor Pavlushchyk, Head
- Website: nazk.gov.ua/en

The National Agency on Corruption Prevention (Ukrainian: Національне агентство з питань запобігання корупції, romanized: Natsionaľne ahenstvo z pytań zapobihanńia koruptsiji, abbr. НАЗК, NACP (Note: Alternately translated as National Agency for the Prevention of Corruption, and abbreviated NAPC.)) is a national anti-corruption agency of the Ukrainian government which is responsible for shaping and implementing anti-corruption policy, while creating an environment conducive to corruption prevention. It has been functioning since 2016.

== Function ==
The agency is one of the four anti-corruption pillars of Ukraine, created after the Euromaidan revolution, along with the National Anti-Corruption Bureau of Ukraine (NABU), the Specialized Anti-Corruption Prosecutor's Office (SAPO) and the High Anti-Corruption Court of Ukraine (HACC).

In contrast to the NABU, which is a law-enforcement institution, the NACP has a preventive function. As such, the Agency develops regulations that help prevent corruption and ensures compliance with them.

The candidates of the 2019 Ukrainian presidential election were required submit a declaration of income for the year preceding the year of the beginning of the election. These documents will be scrutinized by the National Agency on Corruption Prevention who will subsequently publish the results of the audit.

As one of its major services, the agency runs an anti-corruption portal. The agency maintains a list called International Sponsors of War with companies they deem contribute to the Russian war effort in Ukraine.

== Heads of the agency ==
- Natalia Korchak (2015–2018)
- Natalia Novak (acting, 2019)
- Oleksandr Novikov (2019–2024)
- Viktor Pavlushchyk (2024, incumbent)

== See also ==
- Law enforcement in Ukraine
- 2020–2022 Ukrainian constitutional crisis
- Civil Oversight Council of the National Anti-corruption Bureau of Ukraine
- Corruption in Ukraine
- European Union Anti-Corruption Initiative in Ukraine – Technical assistance in fighting corruption by the EU and Denmark in Ukraine
- High Anti-Corruption Court of Ukraine – Ukrainian court concerning corruption in Ukraine
- List of anti-corruption agencies
