= List of anti-corruption agencies =

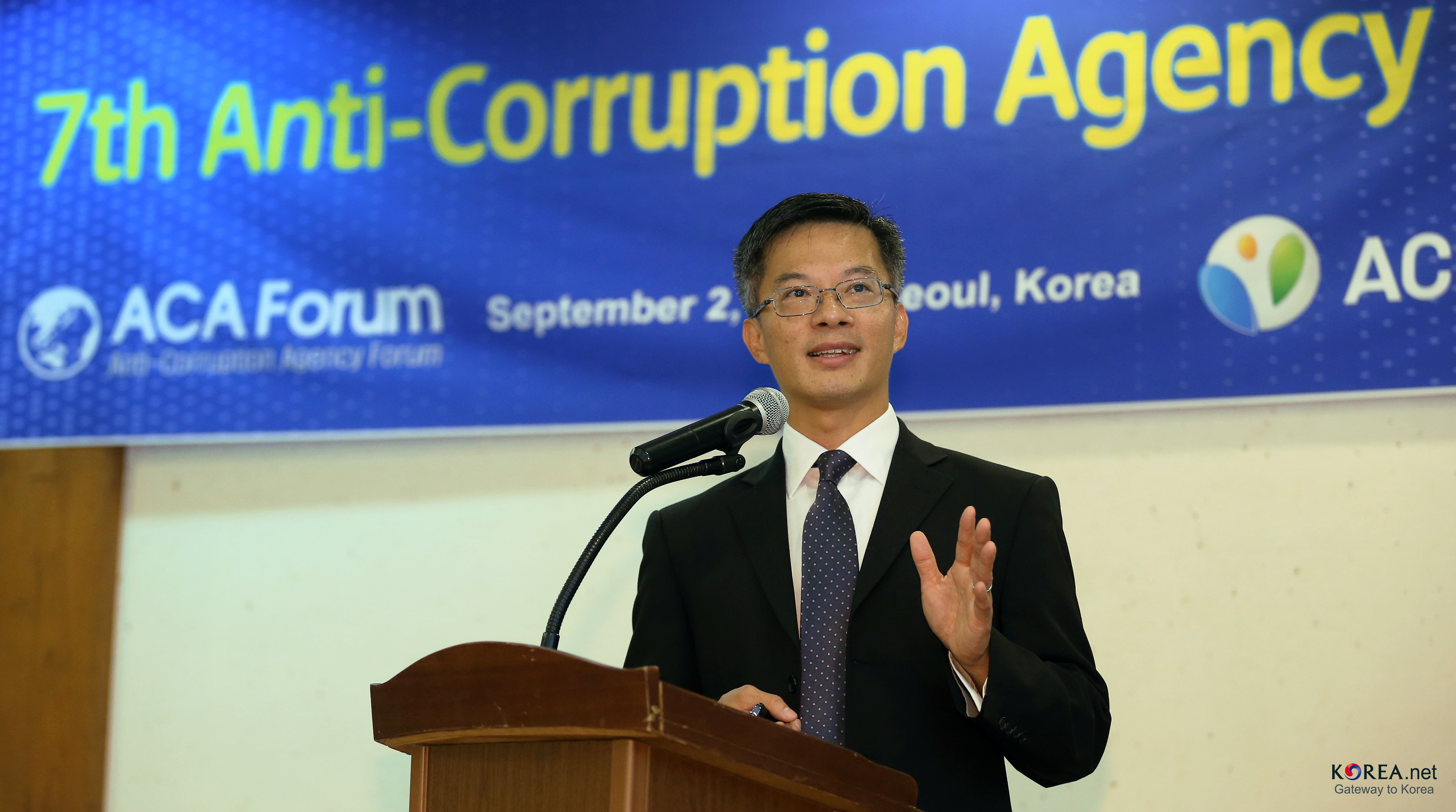
Anti-Corruption Forum. Nine government organizations from eight countries shared information and experiences and discuss cooperation and exchanges on corruption prevention and anti-corruption policies at the 7th Anti-Corruption Agency (ACA) Forum held on September 2 and 3, 2013 in Seoul, South Korea.

An anti-corruption agency is a special police agency specialised in fighting political corruption and engaging in general anti-corruption activities. Most are founded by statute, but some have a constitutional status.

== List ==
- Argentina: Oficina Anticorrupción
- Australia: National Anti-Corruption Commission
  - Australian Capital Territory: ACT Integrity Commission
  - New South Wales: Independent Commission Against Corruption
  - Northern Territory: Independent Commissioner Against Corruption
  - Queensland: Crime and Corruption Commission
  - South Australia: Independent Commission Against Corruption
  - Tasmania: Integrity Commission
  - Victoria: Independent Broad-based Anti-corruption Commission, Office of Police Integrity (defunct)
  - Western Australia: Corruption and Crime Commission
- Austria: Bundesamt zur Korruptionsprävention und Korruptionsbekämpfung (BAK)
- Azerbaijan: Commission on Combating Corruption, Anti-Corruption General Directorate with the Prosecutor General
- Bangladesh: Anti Corruption Commission
- Belarus: Department of financial investigations of the Committee of State Control
- Brazil: Comptroller General
- Myanmar: Anti-Corruption Commission
- Burundi: Anti-corruption and Economic Malpractice Observatory
- Bhutan: Anti-Corruption Commission
- Botswana: Directorate on Corruption and Economic Crime, Ethics and Integrity Directorate
- Cameroon: National Anti-Corruption Observatory
- Canada
  - Quebec: Unité permanente anticorruption
- Cayman Islands: Anti-Corruption Commission
- China: National Supervisory Commission, Central Commission for Discipline Inspection, Commission for Discipline Inspection of the Central Military Commission
  - Hong Kong: Independent Commission Against Corruption
  - Macau: Commission Against Corruption
- Republic of China (Taiwan): Agency Against Corruption Ministry of Justice, Ministry of Justice Investigation Bureau
- Egypt: Administrative Control Authority
- Ethiopia: Federal Ethics and Anti-Corruption Commission
- European Union: European Anti-Fraud Office (OLAF)
- Fiji: Fiji Independent Commission Against Corruption
- France: Agence française anticorruption
- Hungary: National Asset Recovery and Protection Office
- India: Central Vigilance Commission, Central Bureau of Investigation, Lokayukta
  - Andhra Pradesh: Anti-Corruption Bureau, Andhra Pradesh Lokayukta
  - Rajasthan: Anti-Corruption Bureau
  - Kerala: Vigilance and Anti-Corruption Bureau, Kerala Lokayukta
- Indonesia: Corruption Eradication Commission
- Iraq: Iraq Anti Corruption
- Italy: National Anti-Corruption Authority, Guardia di Finanza
- Jamaica: Major Organised Crime and Anti-Corruption Agency National Integrity Action
- Japan: Special Investigation Department, Public Prosecutors Office
- Kazakhstan: Anti-Corruption Agency of the Republic of Kazakhstan
- Kenya: Ethics and Anti-Corruption Commission
- Kyrgyzstan: Anti-Corruption Business Council
- Latvia: Corruption Prevention and Combating Bureau
- Liberia: Anti-Corruption Commission
- Lithuania: Special Investigation Service
- Madagascar: Bureau Indépendant Anti-corruption
- Malaysia: Malaysian Anti-Corruption Commission
- Mauritius: Independent Commission Against Corruption
- Morocco: National Authority for Integrity and Prevention and Fight Against Corruption
- Myanmar: Anti-Corruption Commission of Myanmar
- Namibia: Anti-Corruption Commission
- Nepal: Commission for the Investigation of Abuse of Authority
- New Zealand: Serious Fraud Office
- Nigeria: Economic and Financial Crimes Commission, Independent Corrupt Practices Commission
- Pakistan: National Accountability Bureau
- Papua New Guinea: Investigation Task Force Sweep
- Philippines: Ombudsman of the Philippines
- Poland: Central Anticorruption Bureau
- Qatar: Rule of Law and Anti-Corruption Center
- Romania: National Anticorruption Directorate, Direcția Generală Anticorupție
- Russia: Investigative Committee of Russia
- Saudi Arabia: National Anti-Corruption Commission
- Serbia: Anti-Corruption Agency
- Seychelles: Anti-Corruption Commission Seychelles
- Sierra Leone: Sierra Leone Anti-corruption Commission
- Singapore: Corrupt Practices Investigation Bureau
- Slovenia: Commission for the Prevention of Corruption of the Republic of Slovenia
- South Africa: National Anti-Corruption Forum
- South Korea: Corruption Investigation Office for High-ranking Officials, Anti-Corruption and Civil Rights Commission, Korea Independent Commission Against Corruption (defunct)
- Spain: National Anti-Fraud Coordination Service, Anti-Corruption Prosecutor's Office
  - Andalucía: Andalusian Office Against Fraud and Corruption
  - Valencia: Valencian Anti-Fraud Agency
  - Catalonia: Catalan Anti-Fraud Agency
- Trinidad and Tobago: Integrity Commission of Trinidad and Tobago, Anti-Corruption Investigation Bureau
- Ukraine: National Anti-Corruption Bureau of Ukraine, National Agency on Corruption Prevention, Specialized Anti-Corruption Prosecutor's Office, Civil Oversight Council of the National Anti-corruption Bureau of Ukraine, High Anti-Corruption Court of Ukraine, European Union Anti-Corruption Initiative in Ukraine
- United Kingdom:
  - England, Wales, Northern Ireland: Serious Fraud Office
- Turks and Caicos Islands: Integrity Commission
- United States: Public Integrity Section, Department of Justice, FBI Criminal Investigative Division, IRS Criminal Investigation Division, Office of Inspector General
- Vietnam: Central Inspection Commission, Central Steering Committee on Anti-Corruption
- Zimbabwe: Anti-Corruption Commission

== See also ==
- Group of States against Corruption – Council of Europe's anti-corruption monitoring body
- Law enforcement by country
- List of law enforcement agencies
