= Specialized Anti-Corruption Prosecutor's Office =

Ukrainian government agency

Specialized Anti-Corruption Prosecutor's Office Спеціалізована антикорупційна прокуратура (Національне Антикорупційне Бюрo України National Anti-Corruption Bureau of Ukraine)

Agency overview
- Formed: 22 September 2015
- Jurisdiction: Ukraine government
- Agency executive: Oleksandr Klymenko, Head
- Parent agency: Prosecutor General of Ukraine; Verkhovna Rada (parliament oversight)

The Specialized Anti-Corruption Prosecutor's Office (Ukrainian: Спеціалізована антикорупційна прокуратура, romanized: Specializovana antykorupcijna prokuratura, abbr. САП, SAP or SAPO) is an independent structural unit of the Prosecutor General of Ukraine, and is primarily responsible for supporting and overseeing criminal investigations launched by the National Anti-Corruption Bureau of Ukraine (NABU).

== Role ==
The office is legally empowered with: supervision over observance of laws during conducting of operational search activity of pre-trial investigation by the NABU; the maintenance of state prosecution in relevant proceedings; and the representation of the interests of a citizen or state in court in cases provided for by law and related to corruption or corruption-related offenses. In contrast to SAPO and NABU, the National Agency on Corruption Prevention aims at preventing corruption by creating an environment that discourages corruption and by proposing legislation.

== Creation ==
The prospect of visa liberalization (visa-free travel to the Schengen Area) between Ukraine and the European Union was closely linked with the process of creating the Specialized Anti-Corruption Prosecutor's Office.

== Leadership and structure ==
The first head of SAPO, Prosecutor Nazar Kholodnytskyi, was appointed in December 2015. On 26 May 2020 Prosecutor General of Ukraine Iryna Venediktova accused him and his fellow anti-corruption prosecutors (in a video message) of "improper performance of official duties" and failing cases against current MP's. Kholodnytsky resigned on 21 August 2020. In his resignation letter, he claimed that the Specialized Anti-Corruption Prosecutor's Office had "systematically faced political attempts to encroach on our independence and manipulate the results of our work."

A commission carried out an open procedure of vetting candidates for the new head and deputy of SAPO in 2021. Out of 37 candidates, only two passed the initial vetting. Oleksandr Klymenko was the clear winner, with 246 points, as assessed in a meeting by the commission on 21 December 2021. Andrii Syniuk was second, with 229 points. On 19 July 2022, the commission formally voted and announced Klymenko as the winner, with Syniuk winning the position of deputy head of SAPO. The formal appointments were to be made by the Prosecutor General's Office. Appointing the head of SAPO was listed by the European Union (EU) as one of the conditions for Ukraine to retain candidate EU membership status. Klymenko was formally appointed on 28 July 2022 by newly elected Prosecutor General of Ukraine Andriy Kostin.

=== Heads of SAPO ===
- Nazar Kholodnytskyi (2015 – 2020)
- Oleksandr Klymenko (28 July 2022 – present)

== See also ==
- Anti-corruption agency
- Corruption in Ukraine
- European Union Anti-Corruption Initiative
- Law enforcement in Ukraine
