= National Anti-Corruption Bureau of Ukraine =

Ukrainian watchdog agency

National Anti-Corruption Bureau
- Націона́льне антикорупці́йне бюро́

Agency overview
- Formed: 14 October 2014
- Superseding agency: National Anti-Corruption Committee
- Jurisdiction: Government of Ukraine
- Headquarters: 3, Surykov St., Kyiv
- Employees: Approximately 700
- Agency executive: Semen Kryvonos, Chairman
- Parent agency: Verkhovna Rada (parliament); Civil Oversight Council of the National Anti-corruption Bureau of Ukraine (public control)
- Website: nabu.gov.ua

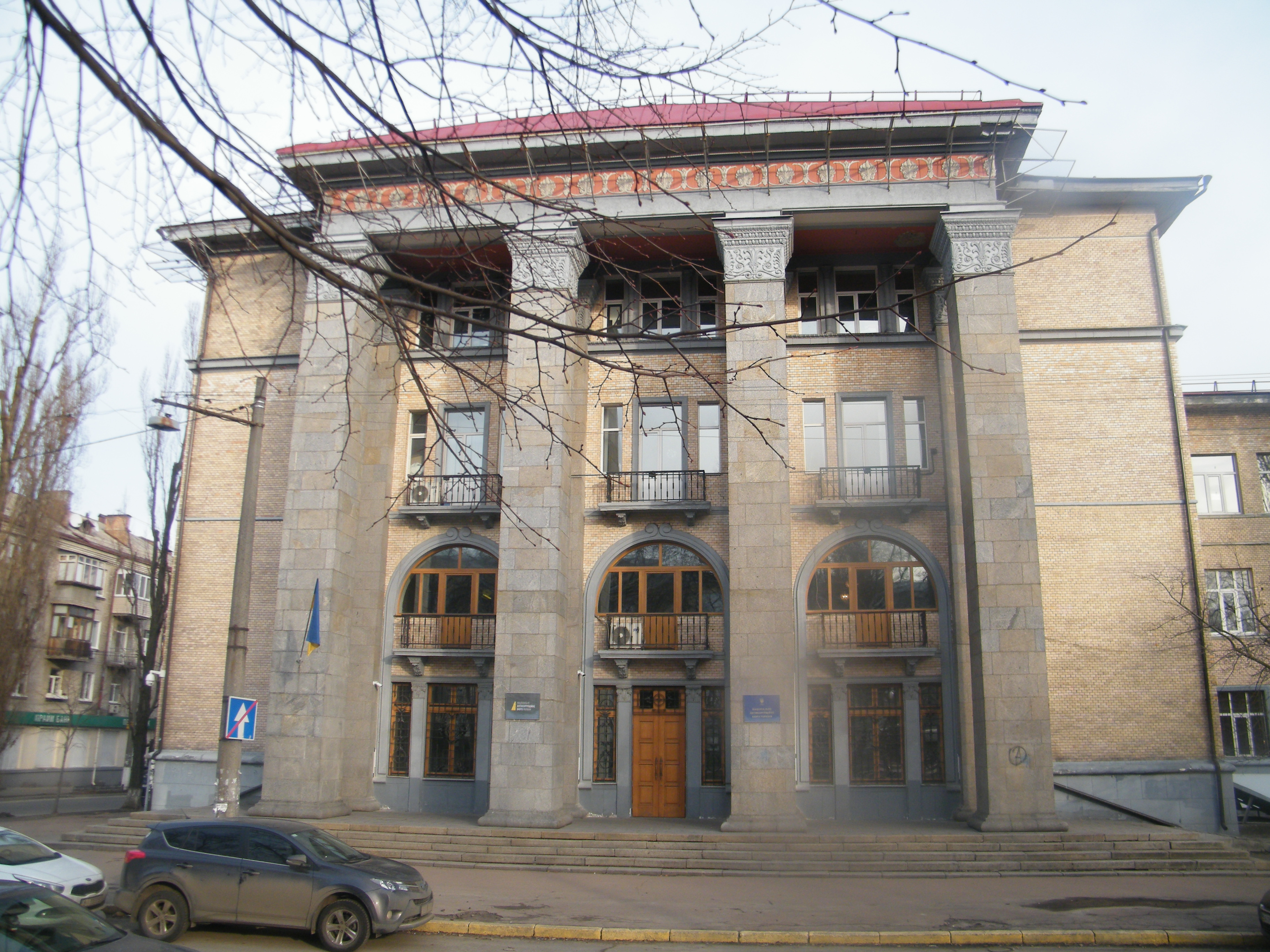
Bureau Headquarters in Kyiv

Regional departments

The National Anti-Corruption Bureau of Ukraine (Ukrainian: Націона́льне антикорупці́йне бюро́ Украї́ни, abbr. НАБУ, romanized: Natsionalne antykoruptsiine biuro Ukrainy, abbr. NABU) is a Ukrainian law enforcement anti-corruption agency that investigates corruption in Ukraine and prepares cases for prosecution. It has investigatory powers, but cannot indict suspects. Only agency findings passed to the Specialized Anti-Corruption Prosecutor's Office become a part of criminal cases.

The agency is set to employ 700 people. Its first 70 detectives started work on 1 October 2015.

The agency's government funding is mandated under American and European Union aid programs. It has an evidence-sharing agreement with the FBI.

The Ukrainian government also employs the National Agency on Corruption Prevention which works to prevent corruption by monitoring government officials' lifestyles.

== History ==
=== National Anti-Corruption Committee ===
The position of Commissioner for anti-corruption policy was established by the second Tymoshenko Government on 24 April 2009. Its first meeting took place on 22 April 2010; at the time, most of its members were government officials. In September 2011, then President of Ukraine Viktor Yanukovych became head of the National Anti-Corruption Committee, while the Justice Minister served as the secretary of the committee. At that time, the committee was tasked to give systematic analysis and to develop measures to combat corruption.

=== Commissioner for anti-corruption policy ===
On 6 March 2014, Tetiana Chornovol became the Commissioner for anti-corruption policy. At the time, the organization was set to employ 1,200 people in seven regional offices. Chornovol resigned on 18 August 2014, stating, "There is no political will in Ukraine to carry out a hard-edged, large-scale war against corruption".

=== Anti-Corruption Bureau ===
Founding and launching the National Anti-Corruption Bureau was one of the requirements set by the IMF and the European Commission for relaxation of visa restrictions between Ukraine and the European Union.

On 14 October 2014, Verkhovna Rada of Ukraine adopted the law "On the National Anti-Corruption Bureau of Ukraine". On 16 April 2015, the President of Ukraine Petro Poroshenko signed two decrees: No. 217/2015 – decree on founding the National Anti-corruption Bureau of Ukraine and No.218/2015 — decree on appointing Artem Sytnyk as the Bureau's Director. The first order signed by the NABU Director on 23 April 2015 approved the Bureau's structure and staffing. On 24 April, Gizo Uglava was appointed First Deputy Director. When Gizo Uglava was hired by Artem Sytnyk, he said: "Ukraine matters to Georgia, we believe that if we save Georgia, we save Ukraine, and the other way round. Moreover, that's my chance to do what I love – to investigate".

The agency's detectives underwent training sponsored by the U.S. Federal Bureau of Investigation and the European Union.

From June 2017, the NABU Director is a member of the EUACI's Steering Committee. The National Anti-Corruption Bureau is one of the beneficiaries this program.

=== 2019 ===
On 25 February, the group of anti-corruption investigations "Bigus.Info" published a report about people from Petro Poroshenko's surroundings who are in control of thefts in the defense sector. In March, two criminal proceedings were opened regarding involvement of people from Petro Poroshenko's team in the theft in the defense sphere. Ex-First Deputy Secretary of the National Security and Defense Council Oleh Hladkovsky, his son Ihor and other persons were searched.

In November, the Bureau served notice of suspicion to one of the richest Ukrainians, Oleg Bakhmatyuk, over the NBU's takeover of a $1.2bn USD loan.

In November, the deputy chief of the Kyiv City Customs and the Odesa businessman Vadim Alperin, whom the media called "the king" and the "godfather" of Ukrainian smuggling, was detained. Investigators assert he unsuccessfully offered NABU detective a bribe of $800,000.

=== Scandal related to the 2020 U.S. presidential election ===
Ukrainian media has repeatedly published information about the connections, interventions and influence on the activities of NABU of the US Embassy in Ukraine.

In October 2019, Ukrainian MP and graduate of the KGB school Andrii Derkach published documents about the possible influence of the US Embassy in Ukraine on the activities of NABU. Among the published materials were correspondence between Polina Chyzh, the assistant to the first deputy head of NABU Gizo Uglava, and Hanna Emelyanova, the specialist on legal issues of the anti-corruption program of the US Department of Justice of the US Embassy in Ukraine. According to Derkach, this correspondence contained lists of criminal cases on which NABU detectives worked, as well as instructions on providing information on the case of former Minister of Environmental Protection and owner of Burisma Mykola Zlochevsky. According to Derkach, American politician Joe Biden influenced the Ukrainian authorities and helped to close criminal cases related to the activities of former Minister Mykola Zlochevsky.

In April 2020, former Prosecutor General of Ukraine Viktor Shokin expressed the opinion that the initiator of the establishment of NABU in 2015 was the then US Vice President Joe Biden in order to "steal the investigation powers from the State Bureau of Investigation to NABU and put there emissaries who listen to the United States". Victor Shokin has previously complained about pressure on his activities from Biden in the investigation of the Burisma case and wrote a statement to the State Bureau of Investigation about the disclosure a secret information by NABU staff and Shokin's personal data leak to US embassy in Ukraine.

On 10 September 2020, the United States imposed sanctions on Andriy Derkach among other Russian agents for attempting to influence the U.S. electoral process.

=== 2022 ===
Ukrzaliznytsia PCR test fraud

NABU and SAPO exposed a scheme used by Ukrzaliznytsia officials to purchase more than 11,000 COVID-19 PCR tests at inflated prices. The illegal overpayment would have amounted to almost UAH 5 million, but it was stopped by the Ukrzaliznytsia auditors. They reported the criminal intent to the National Bureau, which, in turn, notified the perpetrators of suspicion.

Receipt of UAH 558 000 in undue advantage by MP

On 23 September 2022, the National Anti-Corruption Bureau (NABU) and the Specialized Anti-Corruption Prosecutor's Office (SAPO) referred the case against an incumbent MP charged with receiving UAH 558,000 in undue advantage to court. His actions fall under Part 2 Art. 369-2 of the Criminal Code of Ukraine. The indictment had been served the day before.

Pre-trial investigation in the 2023

In 2022, NABU detectives and SAPO prosecutors exposed 187 persons and notified them of suspicion. Indictments against 54 persons were sent to court.

Support for the Defense Forces of Ukraine

In 2022 more than 1.22 billion UAH in attempted bribes and other seized assets, recovered as a result of anti-corruption investigations by NABU, was sent to the Armed Forces of Ukraine, to support their ongoing defense against the Russian invasion. This included an attempted $6 million USD bribe from a government official in a case involving the State Tax Service, and $5.5 million USD embezzled by former Minister of Agrarian Policy Mykola Prysiazhniuk.

=== 2023 ===
NABU's output in 2023

2023 was the most successful year for anti-corruption authorities since their establishment. NABU and SAPO uncovered misdeeds involving 21 individuals among the senior officials of the state, 39 heads of state-owned enterprises, 16 judges, and 11 MPs. The economic effect of NABU and SAPO's activities in 2023 amounted to UAH 4.7 billion, which is one and a half times higher than in 2022.

Corruption in Supreme Court

On 15 May 2023, NABU and SAPO carried out one of their most significant operations, exposing the Head of the Supreme Court accepting a bribe. He, along with a middleman lawyer, is suspected of receiving US$2.7 million in exchange for rendering a decision in favor of the owner of the "Finance and Credit" group. The "judicial services" were priced at US$1.8 million, with an additional US$900,000 supposed to be distributed among the intermediaries.

Boiler scheme: Deputy Minister exposed

In January 2023, NABU and SAPO exposed high-level corruption within the Ministry for Communities, Territories and Infrastructure Development of Ukraine. One of the participants in the scheme was a Deputy Minister, who was caught receiving an undue benefit of US$400,000.

Embezzlement of UAH 18 mln from SE "Antonov"

On 10 March 2023, NABU and SAPO notified the former official of Antonov SE (a subsidiary of Ukroboronprom State Concern) and the director of a lawyer's association of suspicion of embezzling more than UAH 18 million from the enterprise and issuing false official documents.

=== 2024 ===
On 2 April, NABU and SAPO uncovered an organized group led by former Presidential Office advisor and active SSU employee Artem Shylo. The group allegedly embezzled UAH 94.8 million from Ukrzaliznytsia (Ukrainian Railways) during transformer procurement. Previously, journalists from bihus.info reported that Shylo had amassed assets worth nearly US$10 million over ten years in public service.

On 23 April, NABU and SAPO served charges on the new Minister of Agrarian Policy and Food of Ukraine, Mykola Solskyi. According to investigators, Solskyi allegedly misappropriated state land worth UAH 291 million and attempted to grab even more soil valued at UAH 190 million.

In May, NABU and SAPO announced charges against the former Deputy Head of the President's Office of Ukraine, Andriy Smyrnov, for alleged illicit enrichment amounting to UAH 15.7 million. Previously, journalists from Ukrainska Pravda reported that Smyrnov's brother had acquired luxury property at significant discounts.

In July, NABU and SAPO filed an indictment against former Infrastructure Minister Andriy Pyvovarsky and his former First Deputy Volodymyr Shulmeyster. They are accused of abuse of power, which resulted in over UAH 30 million in damages to the state.

On 3 October, an external independent audit of the Bureau's work began, as stipulated by the Law "On the National Anti-Corruption Bureau of Ukraine." The audit commission includes independent experts appointed by Ukraine's international partners: Martin Arpo (former deputy director of Estonia's Internal Security Service), Robert Westbrooks (former Deputy Inspector General of the U.S.), and Hermione Theresa Cronje (former Director of Investigations at South Africa's National Prosecuting Authority).

On 9 October, Denys Gulmagomedov, the former deputy director for digital development and digital transformation, was appointed as the first deputy director of NABU.

=== 2025 ===
On 6 February 2025, NABU and SAPO conducted a large-scale operation called “Clean City” to eliminate corruption in Kyiv's land and budget sectors. According to the investigation, members of the criminal organization identified valuable land plots and registered ownership rights to nonexistent houses allegedly built on these territories in the names of persons under their control.

In 22 July, thousands of people protested a new law subordinating NABU and SAPO to the prosecutor general.

In October 2025, NABU, SAPO, and the Come Back Alive Charity signed a memorandum of strategic partnership in the field of security and defense. The cooperation aims to identify corruption risks in defense procurement, including through information sharing and price monitoring.

On 10 November, NABU announced a large investigation into the energy sector, alleging a kickback scheme involving nuclear plant operator Energoatom existed with a $100 million rake-off. It alleged a government adviser and the Energoatom security director had taken control of company purchasing and forced contractors to pay a 10-15% corrupt fee to avoid contracts being blocked. NABU had gathered 1,000 hours of telephone and audio recordings as evidence over the previous 15 months, and started searching Energoatom offices. The National Anti-Corruption Bureau has announced suspicions against seven individuals in the Operation Midas case. The Supreme Anti-Corruption Court has chosen preventive measures in the form of detention with the possibility of posting bail for five of them. Bail was posted for two of the defendants in the Operation Midas case, which allowed them to leave the pre-trial detention center.

== The legislative authority ==
=== Duties ===
1. performing investigative and police operations;
2. conducting the pre-trial inquiry of criminal crimes which belong to their jurisdiction or other, defined by law;
3. checking for virtuous persons who are authorized to the execution of state's functions and local self-governance;
4. undertaking activities of the police search and an arrest of funds and another property which can objects for compensation, also saving funds and other property which were arrested;
5. interacting with other state bodies, bodies of local self-governance and other subjects for execution its duties;
6. performing informational and analytical work;
7. providing personal security of National Buro workers and other persons who are determined by law;
8. under confidentiality and volunteering, providing cooperation with persons, who report about corruption;
9. reporting about its activity and informing society about the results of its work.

=== Rights ===
1. to open investigative cases based on the decree which is approved by the head of the relevant subunit of National Buro and to conduct transparent and unspoken investigative activities;
2. according to the head's decision which is agreed with a prosecutor, to demand investigative and criminal implementations from other law enforcement agencies;
3. due to the decision of the head of the structural subunit of NABU to demand statements about the property, incomes, expenses, financial duties of persons, statements about the funds using of the State Budget of Ukraine, the disposal of state or communal property. NABU has a direct access to public automated informational and reference systems, registers, and a data bank, use the state's means of communication, the networks of the special connections and other technical means;
4. to search documents and another material sources of information which are necessary to prevent, identify, interrupt and investigate criminal crimes, in particular, those which consist limited information;
5. according to the head or his vice's decision which is approved by the prosecutor, to receive information from banks, depository, financial and other institutions, interprices and organizations about operations, accounts, contributions, bargains of natural and legal person;
6. on the basis of the relevant court's decision to seal up archives, cash registers, premises (except living places) or other storages, took them under protection, also to take out items and documents in order which is provided by Criminal Procedure Law;
7. to attract qualified specialists and experts from any institutions, organizations, control and financial bodies on the voluntary basis, including contractual conditions;
8. on the basis of the written decision of the head or the vice of NABU which is agreed by the prosecutor, to create common investigation groups which include operational and investigation workers;
9. to enter freely to the state bodies, the bodies of local self-governance and a zone of customs control by providing a court certificate, also to enter freely to the military corps and institutions, border posts of Ukraine by providing written disposal of the head or his vice;
10. to use transport means which belong to natural and legal person (except transport means of diplomatic, consular and other representations of foreign states and organizations, special vehicles with further refund of losses;
11. to send to the state bodies, the bodies of local self-governance compulsory for the consideration of proposals and recommendations for eliminations reasons and conditions which promote criminal crimes, and also to receive information about their consideration during 30 days;
12. to cooperate with natural persons including the contractual ground and stick to the conditions of voluntariness and confidentiality of these relations, to stimulate people in material and moral way who provide assistance;
13. to sue in case the recognition of agreements' invalidity;
14. to create informational systems and keep an operating account;
15. to hold, carry and use of firearms and special means, and also carry out activities of physical influence;
16. to issue firearms, special means of individual protection and notifications about the danger to protected persons;
17. to cooperate with the competent bodies of foreign states, international organizations;
18. to receive materials which are provided within the frameworks of international law assistance from the procuratorial authorities and Ministry of Justice;
19. to act as a representative of the state's interests during the performance in case management of the police search, arrest, confiscation and return of the appropriate property to Ukraine, the defense of rights and interests of state, and also to attract legal advisers for such purposes; and
20. to raise the issue of the establishment of the special conditions (including the issue of classifying location) in places of imprisonment for people who cooperate with NABU.

== Relationship with other anti-corruption bodies ==
NABU is one of three anti-corruption pillar institutions in Ukraine, created after the Euromaidan.

=== National Agency on Corruption Prevention ===
The National Agency on Corruption Prevention seeks to 'shape and implement anti-corruption policy while creating an environment conducive to corruption prevention'. While NABU focuses on law-enforcement, the NACP shapes policy and develops regulations that help to prevent corruption and ensures compliance.

It is responsible for verifying the accuracy of government officials' asset and income declarations. In July 2016, its civil society representative, Ruslan Riaboshapka, criticised the hiring process, saying that the agency was choosing the lowest-scoring candidates.

=== Specialized Anti-Corruption Prosecutor's Office ===
The Specialized Anti-Corruption Prosecutor's Office (SAPO) supports and oversees criminal investigations launched by NABU, by drawing up indictments and bringing them before the courts.

== Control over the bureau ==
The direct control over the bureau is conducted by the parliamentary committee for combating organized crime and corruption.

The NABU director

- informs the President, Verkhovna Rada, and the Cabinet about key issues in operation of the NABU and its regional centers, about execution of assigned tasks, compliance with the law, rights and freedoms of individuals;
- every year in February and August submits a written report to the President, Verkhovna Rada, and the Cabinet of Ministers about operations of the NABU during the previous six months.

Every year the External Control Commission provide an independent assessment of the NABU's activity. There are three members of the commission:

- Buromenskyi Mykhailo (from the Cabinet of Ministers of Ukraine) - appointed to the post on 26 May 2017;
- Vasylenko Volodymyr (from the Verkhovna Rada) - appointed to the post on 7 June 2018;
- Zhebrivskyi Pavlo (from the President of Ukraine) - appointed to the post on 19 June 2018).

For securing transparency and civil control over the NABU the Council of Civil Control was created. It counts 15 members who have to take an examination based on an open and transparent competition.

On 5 June 2015, there was the first open e-voting for the candidates to the Council of Civil Control. Due to the results of the e-voting 15 members who represent 6 civil society organizations were elected. After the elections to the Council of Civil Control, its members have chosen Vitalii Shabunin as the head of the council. Then the e-voting was defined as illegal by the claim of Sh. Aliev but the claim was not proceed till the end of the cadence.

The second Council of Civil Control which was headed by Roman Maselko and started to work on 31 May 2017. The secretary of the second Council of Civil Control became Halyna Yanchenko. Among the challenges which face the second CCC were the finishing of command forming, functional work organization of local territory administrations, the rising number of investigations, the finishing the stage of judicial review of NABU implementations. That voting also was defined as illegal by the claim of O.Shevchyk but the claim was not proceed till the end of the cadence.

The elections to the 3rd Council of Civil Control took place on 30 May 2018. The head of the Council became Tetiana Locatska.

== Leadership ==
In March 2023, Semen Kryvonos became Director of NABU. Other leaders in March 2023 included First Deputy Director Gizo Uglava and Deputy Directors Tetiana Varvarska, Denys Gulmagomedov and Polina Lysenko.

In October 2024, Denys Gulmagomedov became First Deputy Director.

== See also ==
- 2020–2022 Ukrainian constitutional crisis
- Civil Oversight Council of the National Anti-corruption Bureau of Ukraine
- Corruption in Ukraine
- European Union Anti-Corruption Initiative in Ukraine – Technical assistance in fighting corruption by the EU and Denmark in Ukraine
- High Anti-Corruption Court of Ukraine – Ukrainian court concerning corruption in Ukraine
- Law enforcement in Ukraine
- List of anti-corruption agencies
- National Agency on Corruption Prevention – Ukrainian government agency
- Special Operations Department of the National Anti-Corruption Bureau of Ukraine
- State Bureau of Investigation (Ukraine)
