= Corruption in Ukraine =

Corruption in Ukraine since the country became an independent state in 1991 is a societal issue rooted in the dissolution of the Soviet Union that year. Following independence, Ukrainian politicians from across the political spectrum, criminal bosses, and Ukrainian oligarchs exploited corruption within the National Police of Ukraine, the country's political parties, and industry to gain power. While Ukraine is still considered one of the more corrupt countries in Europe, it has made steady progress in improving its standing since 2015.

== History ==
The modern period of corruption in Ukraine can be traced back to when it formed part of the Soviet Union, prior to 1991. During the 1980s, individuals linked to Soviet organised crime became integrated into the Soviet ruling elite. The American academic Louise Shelley, writing in 1998, commented that corruption in Ukraine followed similar patterns to organized crime and political parties across the post-Soviet space.

For two decades following the establishment of Ukraine as an independent state in 1991, the country experienced a period of violent corruption.

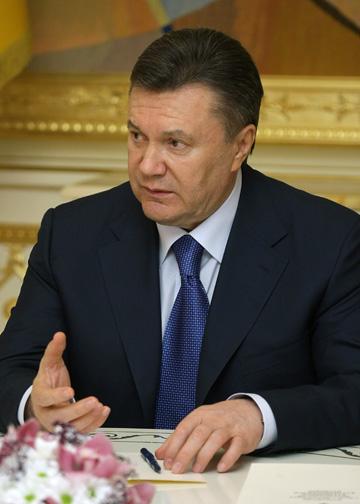
Viktor Yanukovych in April 2010

During this period, corruption in industry and tourism was particularly acute in Donetsk Oblast. In 2005, mass graves containing businesspersons, judges, lawyers, and investigators were discovered in the region. A former governor, Viktor Yanukovych, and his Party of Regions were among those accused of maintaining close ties to organised crime. Despite this, Yanukovych won the 2010 Ukrainian presidential election.

According to the United States Agency for International Development (USAID) in 2006, the main causes of corruption in Ukraine included a compromised justice system, a centralised and non-transparent government, close ties between business and political elites and Russia, and a weakened civil society. Corruption has been a frequent topic of Ukrainian media coverage.

A 2013 survey of Ukrainians found the country's most corrupt officials were believed to be the judiciary, the police, public servants, the health service, and parliament. Yanukovych was overthrown during the Maidan Uprising, which began in 2013 after his government—viewed by many of the protestors as corrupt—refused to sign a trade agreement with the European Union. Yanukovych's pro-Russian tendencies caused Ukrainian nationalists to link corruption in Ukraine with the country's relationship with Russia. In the aftermath of the uprising, law enforcement reforms were introduced to reduce waste, public procurement procedures were changed, and some state-owned industries were dissolved, but critics argued that the progress made in tackling corruption was too limited.

In 2008, Transparency International (TI) estimated that 30–50 percent of Ukrainians had experienced government corruption. Juhani Grossmann, when working in 2009 for the ACTION project (Promoting Active Citizen Engagement in Combating Corruption in Ukraine), which was funded by the USAID, claimed that "Ukrainians pay roughly ₴3.5 billion, or more than US$400 million, in bribes annually." The previous year, he claimed that the figure was US$700 million.

In 2011, Yanukovych announced that corruption was costing his government an estimated US$2.5 billion each year, and that corrupt practices in public procurement alone resulted in 10–15% of the state budget (approximately US$7.4 billion) ending up "in the pockets of officials". According to the economist Ararat Osipian, Ukraine failed to sustain its economic growth trends in the 2000s due to endemic corruption. Corrupt practices marked Yanukovich's period as president; it contributed to his removal from office in 2014, and left the Ukrainian Ground Forces ill-equipped to counter Russia's invasion of Crimea that year.

In 2016, the International Monetary Fund (IMF) stated that a reduction in corruption was a key condition for continued international support for Ukraine. Some Western analysts argued that large foreign loans were not encouraging reform, but instead were enabling the extraction of funds from the country through corrupt practices. The then U.S. Assistant Secretary of State, Victoria Nuland, called for the prosecution of corrupt officials, stating: "It's time to start locking up people who have ripped off the Ukrainian population for too long and it is time to eradicate the cancer of corruption."

A 2025 Gallup opinion poll found that 85% of Ukrainians believed corruption was widespread throughout their government, a figure that had hardly varied since 2007.

== Bribery ==
In the 2000s, bribes were used in Ukraine to ensure that public services were delivered, with many Ukrainians considering their payment to be customary and expected. Some of the largest recorded bribes exceeded US$1 million.

In a 2001 survey conducted by the German market research company GfK, 43% of respondents stated that they had never personally paid a bribe.

According to a Management Systems International survey conducted in 2008, the highest levels of corruption were identified in vehicle inspection services (58%), the police (54%), health care (54%), the courts (49%), and in higher education (44%). In another 2008 survey, 21% of those questioned answered that they—or someone living in their household—had paid a bribe during the previous year. Surveys conducted between 2000 and 2010 showed that a majority of Ukrainians self-reported engaging in corrupt transactions with government authorities.

In the Global Corruption Barometer 2013 produced by TI, Ukrainians reported that the institutions to which they most commonly paid bribes during the preceding two years were the police (49% of responders), medical and health services (41%), and the education system (33%).

== Corruption in Ukrainian politics ==
=== National politics ===
In the years following Ukrainian independence, electoral fraud was widespread, mainly through the administrative resource available to some candidates. According to the British political analyst Taras Kuzio, the fraud accounted to more than five percent of the total vote.

Pavlo Lazarenko, who was the prime minister of Ukraine from 1996 to 1997, allegedly embezzled between US$114 million and 200 million, After the initial round of voting in the 2004 presidential election, the Supreme Court of Ukraine ruled that the scale of the electoral fraud made it impossible to determine the election results, and it ordered a revote. Instances of vote rigging have since declined, although politicians continued to allege election fraud, and some political parties persisted in using tactics to secure votes, and the Ukrainian electorate remained sceptical of the integrity of the electoral process.

In the 2000s, United States diplomats claimed that the privatization of several Ukrainian state enterprises was rigged by politicians in favour of their political allies. In the early 2010s Ukrainian media, particularly the Ukrayinska Pravda, regularly unveiled millionaire lifestyles of Ukrainian politicians and public servants, utterly at odds with their declared official incomes. In 2010, it was reported that Ukrainian politicians regularly accused each other of corruption while claiming to fight it themselves. According to information revealed by means of the 2010 United States diplomatic cables leak, US officials described Ukraine under presidents Leonid Kuchma and Viktor Yushchenko as a kleptocracy.

Minister of Internal Affairs Vitaliy Zakharchenko stated in 2012 that since 2010, about 400 politicians had faced criminal charges in connection with corruption; most of them from the Party of Regions, followed by Bloc Yulia Tymoshenko and Our Ukraine–People's Self-Defense Bloc members. Since 2011, the President, Chairman of the Verkhovna Rada, Prime Minister, Prosecutor General, ministers and other Ukrainian top officials have been liable for prosecution for corruption. Since 2010, the Ukrainian press brought up thousands of examples of criminal cases in which state officials, as well as politicians and businessmen linked to the then-ruling Party of Regions, were shown leniency unprecedented for the general population of suspects. After going undercover in the Reforms for the Future parliamentary faction in early 2012, the Rada deputy Roman Zabzaliuk claimed this faction "bought" its members, paying US$500,000 [for a 'defection' from other parliamentary groups, and then paying a salary of $20,000–25,000 a month. In contrast, according to Reforms for the Future, Zabzalyuk had pretended he was "suffering a very serious disease" and the group had managed to raise some $100,000 for Zabzalyuk to undergo surgery in Israel.

A 2015 survey showed that 72% of adults blamed "corruption of power" for the lack of progress in reform. According to historian Andrew Wilson, as of 2016, progress in reducing corruption was poor. A 2016 requirement for members of the Ukrainian parliament (deputies) to declare their wealth led to a declared cumulative wealth of about $460 million for the 413 deputies. Reacting to public criticism, deputies cancelled a salary rise that would have doubled their monthly salary. This measure was part of an Anti-Corruption Package passed into law in 2014, which was a requirement of international financial support for Ukraine and a prerequisite to eligibility for visa-free travel within the European Union.

=== Local politics ===
In the early 21st century, several Ukrainian mayors were suspected of using their posts to serve their own business interests. In 2009, regional corruption was discovered in connection with land allocation.

In 2013, Serhiy Odarych, former mayor of Cherkasy, was suspected of causing a ₴600,000 loss to the city budget.

=== Judiciary ===
In the early 2010s, Ukrainian politicians and analysts described the country's justice system as "rotten to the core", highlighting the political pressure put on judges. Ukraine's court system was widely regarded as corrupt; independent lawyers and human rights activists have complained that judges are pressurised to hand down a particular verdict. A Ukrainian Justice Ministry survey in 2009 revealed that 10% of respondents trusted the nation's court system, and fewer than 30% believed that it was possible to get a fair trial. Judicial independence exists in principle, but judges were subjected to pressure from political and business interests. In the 2010s, Ukrainian judges were arrested while taking bribes; and during the early part of the decade, it was noticeable that officials and their children (or mazhory) received favourable sentences compared with common citizens.

In 2012, Volodymyr Rokytskyi, Deputy Head of Ukraine's Security Service, was photographed in public wearing a US$32,000 luxury wristwatch—a price equally his yearly official income—at a joint Ukrainian-American event dedicated to fighting illegal drugs. When a 2017 Reuters article quoted the deputy Volodymyr Groysman as saying that "the weakest link in our fight against corruption is the Ukrainian court"; the article gave an example of 30 judges who received salaries ranging from US$10,000–13,000 and who owned Porsches.

The Kyiv Post reported in 2018 that several candidates for a post in the new High Anti-Corruption Court of Ukraine were themselves suspected of, or were associated with, corruption. AutoMaidan, Dejure, and the Anti-corruption Action Center all criticised decisions made in June 2023 by the Ethics Council relating to appointments onto the High Council of Justice. The decisions including the nomination of judges tainted by corruption, and the unfair exclusion of Larysa Golnyk, an anti-corruption whistleblower judge.

In May 2023, on the orders of the National Anti-Corruption Bureau of Ukraine (NABU) and the Specialized Anti-Corruption Prosecutor's Office (SAPO), the President of the Supreme Court of Ukraine Vsevolod Kniaziev was detained while allegedly receiving a bribe. NABU and SAPO reported on their social media accounts about allegations of corruption in the country's Supreme Court of Ukraine. Anti-Corruption officials said that, "NABU and SAP have uncovered massive corruption in the Supreme Court, specifically plans to profit unfairly from the Supreme Court leadership and judges."

== Corruption in the public sector ==
=== Highways ===
In 2016, many of Ukraine's major provincial highways were in very poor condition, with an Ukravtodor official stating that 97% of roads needed repair. The road repair budget was set at about ₴20 billion, but corruption caused the budget to be poorly spent.

=== Nuclear energy ===
In 2015, corruption allegations were made against Energoatom, Ukraine's state nuclear power operator. In 2016, Energoatom's assets and bank accounts were frozen by Ukrainian courts over allegedly unpaid debts, a decision that Energoatom appealed against. In June 2016, its bank accounts were unfrozen.

==== Operation Midas ====
On 12 November 2025, a NABU investigation code-named Operation Midas into an alleged Energoatom US$100 million kickback scheme led to the resignation of Justice Minister German Galushchenko, and the Energy Minister Svitlana Hrynchuk, and the dismissal of Energoatom's supervisory board. Grynchuk had been Galushchenko's deputy Energy Minister, and succeeded him in the post in July 2025. The investigation involved 1,000 hours of audio recordings and about 70 search operations. When President Volodymyr Zelenskyy called for the resignation of the ministers, they quickly complied.

Among the seven suspects named by prosecutors was an entrepreneur Timur Mindich, who had co-owned the Kvartal 95 Studio with Zelenskyy prior to his election to the presidency, and Dmytro Basov, an executive director at Energoatom.

The Economy Ministry announced that a new supervisory board for Energoatom would be named within a week, that the G7 countries would be consulted, and that Energoatom would undergo an audit to be reviewed by law enforcement officials.

On November 28, 2025, investigators raided the home of Andriy Yermak, the head of the Office of the President of Ukraine. Zelenskyy dismissed him later that day. Reports indicated that Yermak had played a central role in July 2025 efforts to curtail the independence of anti-corruption bodies, allegedly to obstruct the Energoatom investigation; protests forced the government to reverse course within days. Internal polling shared with The Economist suggested that trust in Zelenskyy had fallen by half since the NABU revelations.

=== Higher education ===
In the 2000s and 2010s, higher education in Ukraine was plagued by bribery. In 2011, 33% of all students claimed they had encountered corruption in their school, 29% heard about cases of corruption from other students, while 38% had not encountered corruption. According to TI research undertaken in 2008, 47.3% of university students stated that a bribe had been demanded from them; of those, 29% had paid this bribe freely. Students paid bribes for admission to a college, for exam results, and to get their doctoral or master's theses evaluated.

Bribes ranged from US$10 to US$50 for an exam pass to several thousand for entry to a university. According to government sources, bribes varied from US$80 to US$21,500. Salaries of teachers and professors were low in Ukraine compared with other professions; this may have tempted them to demand bribes. According to Ararat Osipian, entire corruption hierarchies formed in Ukraine's colleges and universities. These hierarchies evolved from the 1990s as a result of uncontrolled and rampant corruption. Ararat claimed in 2010 that corrupt ruling regimes control corrupt universities and force them into compliance, including during the elections. This was aided by universities largely still having Stalinist-type bureaucracies, unable to transform.

Until 2015, university autonomy was nonexistent. In 2015, the Ukrainian parliament passed a new law on higher education to give universities more autonomy, including control over their own finances. The aim was to encourage private investment, fundraising and the creation of endowments.

In the 2000s, Ukrainian government officials were caught with fake university diplomas.

=== Social security ===
In 2012, Yanukovych reported that only about 23 percent of social service funds go to those who actually need them. The Ukrainian media featured many stories revealing that even parliamentarians illegally received social benefits, fraudulently claiming to be war and Chornobyl veterans.

=== Healthcare ===
Though medical care in state-run hospitals is theoretically free for Ukrainians, during the 2000s, patients commonly paid out-of-pocket to ensure they receive any treatment required. In 2012, advocacy groups accused Health Ministry officials of embezzling money that should have been used to treat Ukrainian AIDS patients, by buying AIDS drugs at inflated prices.

== Corruption in the business sector ==
In 2011, the Organisation for Economic Co-operation and Development stated corruption was a "significant obstacle" to doing business in Ukraine. Research conducted by Ernst & Young in 2011 and 2012 showed that the practice of top business managers accepting bribes increased by 9 percent in 2011 and 15 percent in 2012. Another 4 percent were ready to pay bribes in order to hide the details of their financial performance.

In the early 2010s, the representative of a UK-based company claimed non-Ukrainian companies often lost contracts if they did not pay bribes or failed to "out-bribe" their competitors. Ukrainians and business representatives claimed that "Business ventures above a certain level require palm-greasing of some functionary at some level."

== Anti-corruption procedures and institutions ==
In a survey in 2001, 80% of respondents were in agreement with the statement: "The present [Ukrainian] government has no real interest in punishing corruption." After his election in late 2004, Yushchenko promised a "War on Corruption". Several politicians were investigated the following year, among them Borys Kolesnikov and Yuri Boyko. Oleksandr Turchynov, the former chairman of the Security Service of Ukraine, claimed that in the summer of 2005, Yushchenko prevented a fraud investigation relating to the transport of Turkmen natural gas to Ukraine, and prevented Boyko's arrest for an abuse of office when he was the director of Naftogaz: In a 2005 interview, Turchynov said Yushchenko had told him to stop "persecuting my men", and that the investigation of RosUkrEnergo was "creating a conflict with Russian President Vladimir Putin". Ukraine joined the Group of States Against Corruption in 2006.

Like his predecessor Yushchenko, Yanukovych (and his Azarov Government) made the fight against corruption a spearhead in his domestic policies. Political opponents of Yanukovych accused him of using his anti-corruption campaign for politically motivated trials; the general public in Ukraine largely shared this view. Yanukovych denied this. In September 2011 the National Anti-Corruption Committee was introduced.

The International Association of Anti-Corruption Authorities spoke in April 2011 of "remarkable successes in fighting corruption in 2010". The EU Ambassador to Ukraine, Jose Manuel Pinto Teixeira, stated at an investment conference on February 28, 2012, that Yanukovych's pledges of reform "have regrettably produced no such results".

In May 2014, an Anti-Corruption Initiative was established. In December, it appointed Lithuanian economist and former European Commissioner for Taxation and Customs Union, Audit and Anti-Fraud Algirdas Šemeta as Business Ombudsman. NABU was established in the same year after its predecessor, the National Anti-Corruption Committee, was considered a failure. For designing and implementing systematic change tending to prevent corruption, the National Agency for Prevention of Corruption was created in 2015.

In 2015, President Petro Poroshenko sacked Ihor Kolomoisky — the billionaire governor of the key industrial region of Dnipropetrovsk — after armed men suspected of links to Kolomoisky briefly occupied the offices of a state-owned oil firm in Kyiv.

In 2018, a law came into force requiring that cases concerning corruption be brought directly to the High Anti-Corruption Court of Ukraine. In June 2018 President Poroshenko expected the court to be established before the end of 2018. In 2019 the High Anti-Corruption Court did start to work. Due to the IMF concern that oligarchs would use the courts to seize bailout money, parliament passed a bill in 2020 to prevent courts from reversing bank nationalizations. The bill would combat a lawsuit by oligarch Ihor Kolomoisky and others seeking to regain control of PrivatBank, the recipient of a $5.5 billion 2016 bailout and an alleged "money laundering machine" under Kolomoisky.

In 2020, the Constitutional Court of Ukraine triggered a constitutional crisis when it ruled that anti-corruption legislation, including the mandatory electronic declaration of income, was unconstitutional. Zelenskyy warned that if parliament did not restore these anti-corruption laws, foreign aid, loans and visa-free travel to the European Union were at risk. The governor of the National Bank of Ukraine reported that because of the issue, Ukraine would not receive a scheduled $700 million IMF loan before the end of 2020. On December 4, 2020, the Ukrainian parliament restored the legislation, reauthorising criminal penalties for officials who lied about their incomes. On December 29, 2020, Zelenskyy suspended the Constitutional Court's chairperson Oleksandr Tupytskyi for two months. On July 19, 2022, Oleksandr Klymenko was announced as the new head of SAPO, following an open competition for the post.

== Comparisons with other countries ==
A 1995 national poll initiated by the Ukrainian government showed that 42% of the survey's respondents viewed corruption as "a shameful phenomenon that has no objective grounds", while 36% viewed it as "a component of social traditions".

In the 2010s, the Ukrainian economist Oleh Havrylyshyn compared Ukrainian corruption to global trends, using data from TI. His research estimated that corruption levels in Ukraine were comparable to those in Sub-Saharan Africa, identifying Uganda as the country's closest counterpart.

In 2012, Ernst & Young ranked Ukraine among the three most corrupt nations out of 43 surveyed. In 2015, The Guardian labelled Ukraine as "the most corrupt nation in Europe". By 2017, an Ernst & Young poll of experts ranked Ukraine ninth-most corrupt out of 53 surveyed nations.

CPI scores for Ukraine from 1998 to 2025, and Europe in 2025; (lower scores are an indication of higher perceptions of corruption)

=== Corruption Perceptions Index ===
Transparency International's annual Corruption Perceptions Index (CPI) measures perceptions of corruption, as seen by business people and country analysts, in the public sector of many countries of the world. Transparency International then scores the countries on a scale from "highly corrupt" to "very clean" and ranks them by score. The country with the highest score is ranked first and is perceived to have the most honest public sector.

==== Recent performance ====
The 2025 CPI scored Ukraine at 36 on a scale from 0 ("highly corrupt") to 100 ("very clean"). When ranked by score, Ukraine ranked 104th among the 182 countries in the Index, where the country ranked first is perceived to have the most honest public sector. For comparison with regional scores, the best score among Eastern European and Central Asian countries (Note: Albania, Armenia, Azerbaijan, Belarus, Bosnia and Herzegovina, Georgia, Kazakhstan, Kosovo, Kyrgyzstan, Moldova, Montenegro, North Macedonia, Russia, Serbia, Tajikistan, Turkey, Turkmenistan, Ukraine, Uzbekistan) was 50, the average score was 34 and the worst score was 17. For comparison with worldwide scores, the best score was 89 (ranked 1), the average score was 42, and the worst score was 9 (ranked 181 in a two-way tie).

Discussing Ukraine in 2025, TI commented that the significant procurement and defence-sector scandals which emerged that year showed at once that Ukraine's anti-corruption agencies were working successfully and that much corruption remained for them to uproot. TI concluded, "The challenge now is to move from reactive clean-ups after each scandal to structural reforms that close loopholes and better protect public resources." TI had struck a similar note in discussing Ukraine's score in 2024: it had improved steadily for 11 years, but the high number of corruption cases that were detected and prosecuted in 2024 was an indication that significant work remained to be done.

==== Historical performance ====
The following table shows Ukraine's ranking in the Corruption Perceptions Index from the Index's inception until 2011; recall that the country ranked first is perceived to have the most honest public sector. Each country's ranking was computed using several surveys conducted by different organizations. Because not every survey was available every year for every country, the number of countries ranked in the Index varies from year to year.

CPI data for Ukraine (1998–2011)
Year	Ranking	Number of surveys used to compute ranking (Note: In 2004, 18 surveys conducted by 12 organizations were consulted if available. If less than 3 surveys were available, then that country was not included in the Corruption Perceptions Index. In 2006, 12 surveys conducted by 9 organizations were consulted if available. As in previous years, if less than 3 surveys were available, then that country was not included in the Corruption Perceptions Index.)	Reference(s)
1998	69 of 85	6	
1999 (Note: In the cited 1999 and 2000 Transparency International annual reports, the data were reported as 1998 and 1999 respectively. No data were reported as 2000 data.)	75 of 99	10	
2001 (Note: In the cited Transparency International annual reports for 2001 and after, the data were reported as belonging to the year of the annual report. No data were reported as 2000 data.)	83 of 91	6	
2002	85 of 102	6	
2003	106 of 133	10	
2004	122 of 146	10	
2005	107 of 158	8	
2006	99 of 163	6	
2007	118 of 179	7	
2008	134 of 180	8	
2009	146 of 180	8	
2010	134 of 178	8	
2011	152 of 183	10	

Although the Corruption Perceptions Index computes both a score and a ranking for each country for each year's Index, it was not until 2012 that the method of computing the score allowed a country's score to be compared from year to year; before 2012, a country's scores could only be compared to the scores of other countries in the same year. In contrast, from 2012 onward, a given country's scores could be compared to each other year-to-year. Consequently, Ukraine's scores, along with their confidence range and standard error, are included in the following table.

CPI data for Ukraine (2012–2025)
Year	Ranking	CPI score (0-100)	90% Confidence range of score (Note: The 90% confidence range measures the reliability of the statistical calculations used to compute the Corruption Perception Index score. A more narrow confidence range indicates more reliable calculations.)	Standard error of score (Note: "The standard error term is calculated as the standard deviation of the rescaled source data, divided by the square root of the number of sources.")	Number of surveys used to compute score (Note: In 2025, 13 corruption investigations conducted by 12 organizations were consulted if available. If less than 3 of these were available, then that country was not included in the Corruption Perceptions Index.)	Reference(s)
2012	144 of 176	26	24–29	1.8	8	
2013	144 of 175	25	22–28	1.7	8	
2014	142 of 175	26	23–29	1.64	8	
2015	130 of 167	27	24-30	1.93	8	
2016	131 of 176	29	25–32	1.97	9	
2017	130 of 180	30	26-34	2.27	9	
2018	120 of 180	32	28-36	3.31	8	
2019	126 of 180	30	26-34	2.38	9	
2020	117 of 180	33	31-35	1.31	9	
2021	122 of 180	32	30-34	1.29	9	
2022	116 of 180	33	31-35	1.44	8	
2023	104 of 180	36	33-39	1.93	8	
2024	105 of 180	35	32-38	2.09	8	
2025	104 of 182	36	32-40	2.40	8	
