= Nazar Kholodnytskyi =

Ukrainian attorney

Nazar Kholodnytskyi (Ukrainian: Назар Холодницький; February 1, 1985, Lviv) is a Ukrainian prosecutor, the Deputy Attorney General — the head of Specialized Prosecution Service (till August 21, 2020).

== Biography ==
Nazar Kholodnytskyi was born on January 31, 1985, in Lviv.

He graduated from the Faculty of Law of Ivan Franko National University of Lviv in 2006. Frank with honors, obtaining a master's degree in Law.

At the same time, he began working in the Kyiv Oblast Prosecutor's Office as an assistant, senior assistant, and senior prosecutor of the Kyiv-Sviatoshynskyi District Prosecutor's Office.

Kholodnytskyi held the position of Senior Assistant to the First Deputy Prosecutor General of Ukraine (March — February 2014).

He has a PhD in Law (2015).
