= High Anti-Corruption Court of Ukraine =

Ukrainian court concerning corruption in Ukraine

- Ukrainian: Вищий антикорупційний суд України
- Established: 11 April 2019
- Jurisdiction: Ukraine
- Appeals to: Appeal Chamber of the High Anti-Corruption Court
- Number of positions: 38

Head
- Currently: Vira Mykhailenko
- Since: 14 February 2023

The High Anti-Corruption Court of Ukraine (Ukrainian: Вищий антикорупційний суд України, romanized: Vyshchyi antykoruptsiinyi sud Ukrainy [ˈwɪʃtʃɪj ɐntɪkorʊpˈts⁽ʲ⁾ijnɪj ˈsud ʊkrɐˈjinɪ]; abbr. ВАКС України, HACC of Ukraine) is a Ukrainian court established on 11 April 2019. The court handed down its first sentence on 30 October 2019. Cases concerning corruption in Ukraine are to be brought directly to this court. The jurisdiction of the court covers crimes that caused damage of an equivalent of at least 31 thousand USD. Appeals are considered by a completely separate Appeal Chamber of the High Anti-Corruption Court.

== Structure ==
The court has 35 judges appointed and at least 10 of them appointed to the Appeals Chamber. These judges and persons living with them, spouses, parents, brothers and sisters, grandparents, spouse's parents, grandchildren, adopted children and foster parents will be provided with a full protection. The judges are elected by the High Judicial Qualifications Commission with the help of the Public Council of International Experts (a new body of six people that consists of foreign experts).

== History ==
=== Preparations ===
In December 2016 Minister of Justice Pavlo Petrenko said that a relevant bill for establishing a special anti-corruption court was ready to be sent to the Ukrainian parliament. Parliament saw the draft in December 2017. Parliament adopted the final version of this law on 7 June 2018. The law on the High Anti-Corruption Court of Ukraine came into force on 14 June 2018. Ukrainian President Petro Poroshenko signed the law "On the Establishment of the High Anti-Corruption Court" on 26 June 2018.

The law had undergone about 2,000 amendments during its passage. The International Monetary Fund will have to assess if it is sufficient to meet its anti-corruption requirements to release the next tranche of money under its $17.5 billion cash-for-reforms agreement. In December 2018, the court was set to be established during the first quarter of 2019.

=== Official establishment ===
On 11 April 2019, the court was established, President Petro Poroshenko signed the decree appointing the judges during an official ceremony (initially, the court was to be established by March 2019). 38 judges were appointed. On the same day, the judges took oaths.

=== Election of the first head and start of functioning ===
On 7 May 2019, after repeated failures of one judge to secure a majority of at least 20 votes for the election at the office of Head of the HACC, judge Olena Tanasevych was elected. In May 2019 it was expected that the HACC would begin working on 5 September 2019. On 5 September the High Anti-Corruption Court did start to work. The court handed down its first sentence on 30 October 2019.

== Heads of the High Anti-Corruption Court of Ukraine ==
- Judge Olena Tanasevych (May 2019 - 6 May 2022)

== See also ==
- Corruption in Ukraine
- List of anti-corruption agencies
- National Anti-Corruption Bureau of Ukraine – Ukrainian watchdog agency (NABU)
- Law enforcement in Ukraine
