= Red Excavator Factory =

Ukrainian heavy equipment manufacturer (1889–2012)

Coordinates: 50.454498°N 30.392915°E

JSC Excavator
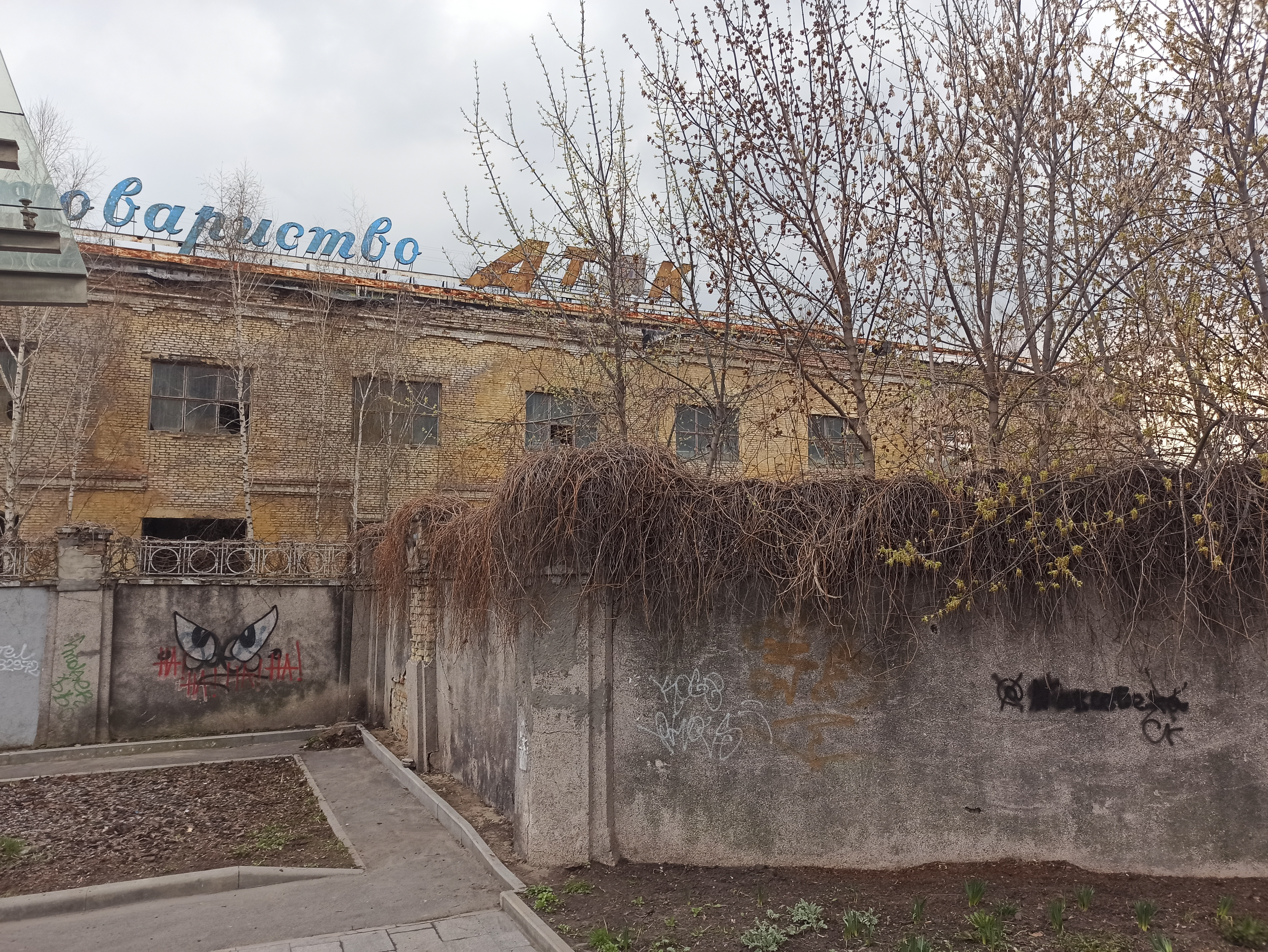
- Native name: АТ «Екскаватор»
- Formerly: V. Filvert and F. Dedina Technical Office; Filvert and Dedina Seeder Plant; Red Ploughman; Red Excavator
- Industry: Heavy equipment
- Founded: 1889; 137 years ago in Kiev, Kiev Governorate, Russian Empire
- Founder: Vaclav Filvert; Frantisek Dedina
- Defunct: 2012
- Fate: Bankrupt
- Headquarters: 83 Prospect Beresteiskyi, Kyiv, Ukraine

The Red Excavator Factory (Russian: Завод «Красный экскаватор», Ukrainian: Завод «Червоний екскаватор») was a manufacturer of agricultural, mining and construction machinery based in Kyiv. Initially founded in the era of the Russian Empire as a branch of Austro-Hungarian Škoda Works, later reorganised into the Filvert and Dedina Seeder Plant, the plant was nationalised by the Government of the Soviet Union. Following Ukrainian independence, the plant came under the JSC Excavator (Ukrainian: АТ «Екскаватор») organisation, or ATEK for short, but would struggle to continue operations, declaring bankruptcy in 2012.

== History ==
=== Russian Empire ===
==== Russian-Czech Cooperation ====
In 1889 a representative office of the Austro-Hungarian Škoda Works was opened in Kiev by Vaclav Filvert and Frantisek Dedina for the manufacture and import of mechanical equipment from the Kingdom of Bohemia. In 1898, the office was reorganised into the Filvert and Dedina Seeder Plant. A factory was built along the Brest-Liytovske highway for the construction of agricultural equipment. The first technical director of the plant was Antonin Veska of Jičín. By 1910, over seven thousand seed drills had been produced. The plant expanded into the production of traction engines and threshing machines. By now, the number of employees at the plant had increased to six-hundred.

==== Expansion ====
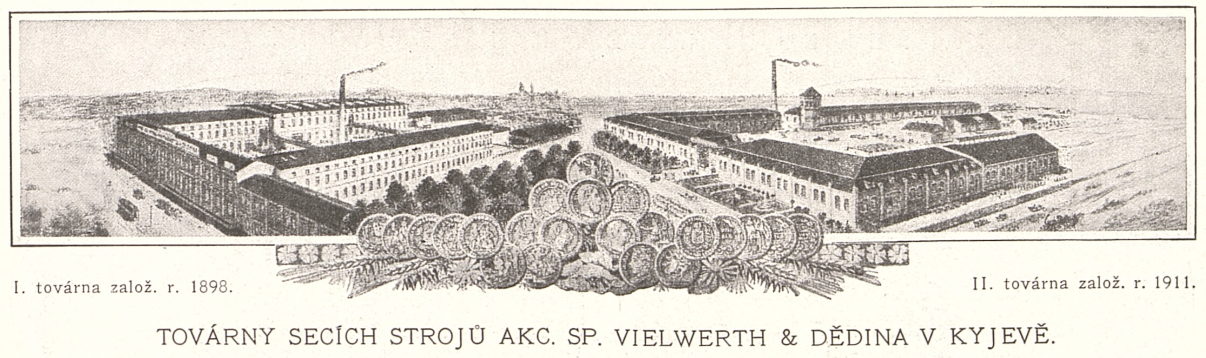
Machine factories of the joint-stock company Filvert & Dedina.

As a result of booming production, a decision was made to expand manufacturing facilities to Svyatoshin, on the former territory of Galgany Farm, with close access to the cities rail network. Construction was complete in 1911. From 1911 until the start of the First World War, Filvert and Dedina saw steady sales both domestically, as well as export sales to Germany, Austria-Hungary as well as the Balkans. In 1913, the company showcased a number of products including seeders, threshers and traction engines at the All-Russian Exhibition held in Kiev.

==== World War I ====
With the onset of World War I, and hostilities between the Russia and Austria-Hungary, Vaclav Filvert left Kiev for Prague, and was never able to return. Frantisek Dedina, an ardent monarchist and supporter of Tsar Nicholas II, threw his support behind the Russian backed Czechoslovak Legion. From 1914 to 1916 production declined significantly. Subsequently in 1916, Slavic prisoners of war who had been mobilised into the Austro-Hungarian Army, held in the Darnitsky and Pechersk prisoner of war camps were freed and employed in the plant. Following the Bolshevik takeover of Kyiv, Dedina would also return to Prague.

=== Soviet Union ===
==== Early years ====
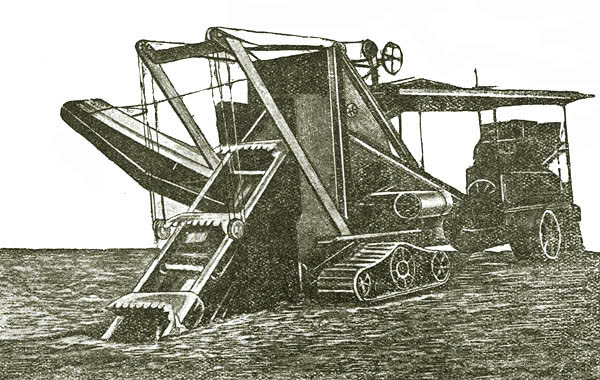
SSSM-750 trencher excavator

In 1918, the factory came under the control of the new Soviet government, receiving the new name Red Ploughman, continuing to produce agricultural equipment such as clover and garden seeders. From 1934, Red Ploughman began the production of SSSM-140 and later SSSM-750 excavators. In 1935, the plant was once again renamed Red Excavator. Among the plants employees included the inventor Vitaly Seminsky and the later Mayor of Kyiv Alexey Davydov. In the 1930s, work was progressing on the Palace of the Soviets in Moscow. To facilitate construction, a large number of concrete mixers were required. In 1938, the plant began construction of the SSSM-738 mounted on a YaG-6 5-ton cargo truck. Additional concrete mixers based on the ZiS-6 were also produced.

==== World War II ====
With the onset of Operation Barbarossa in World War II, the factory was evacuated to Tyumen, east of the Ural Mountains. The enterprise was collocated with the Tyumen Machine Tool Plant, producing a variety of supplies for the war effort. Meanwhile, during the Nazi occupation of Ukraine, the plant attempted to restart construction of wheelbarrows but to little success. Following the Battle of Kiev (1943), restoration of plant began under the direction of Jopseh Karakis, completing in 1953. Further redevelopment was planned, but not implemented due to budget constraints.

==== Golden Age ====
Following the war, a number of excavators, concrete mixers, loaders and trailers were produced at the plant. Demand significantly increased in the post-war era, due to rapid advancements in Soviet agricultural industry, as well as immense demand for construction equipment for large scale rebuilding and development. From 1949 to 1952 the plant produced over 500 T-107 loaders and more than 500 EM-182 excavators. In the 1950s, an in-line assembly line was implemented, as well as a research and development facility headed by Vitaly Seminsky. The plant additionally entered into cooperation with the Tallinn Excavator Factory. In 1955 the plant began production of the E-153, the Soviet Union's first hydraulic powered excavator.

In 1962 modernisation works began on the factory, with the construction of a new four-story production building, as well as new metals workshop. By the mid 1960s, the factory additionally became one of the first enterprises of the USSR where computer based planning and operational management was implemented. In 1966, the plant was awarded the Order of the Red Banner of Labour for the successful implementation of the 1959-1965 Seven Year Plan. In 1967, the plant began production of the E-5015 excavator. A mock up of the vehicle was installed on a rotating platform beside the plants main gate on Prospekt Pobedy.

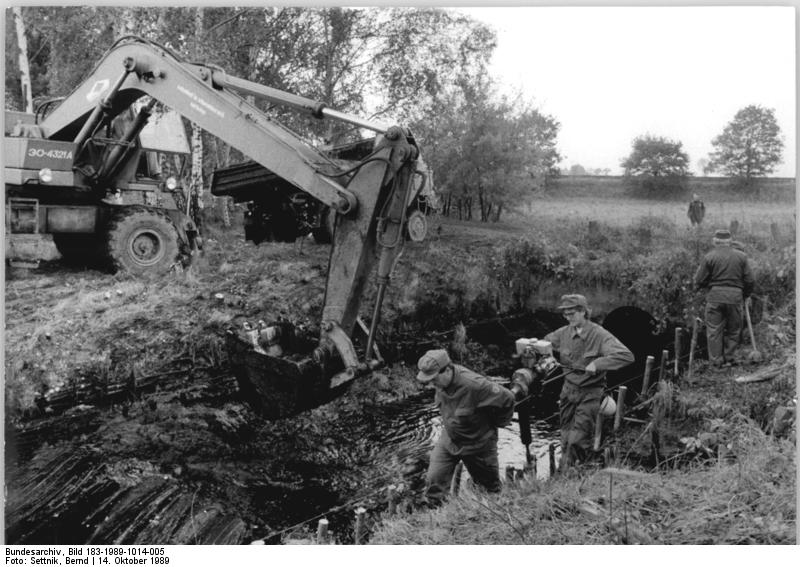
EO-4321

In 1974, due to the rapidly expanding city limiting expansion, the plant entered into a production association with the Borodyanka Excavator Plant (Later known as Borex), Galich Excavator Plant and the Saransk Excavator Plant. By the 70s, the 100,000th excavator rolled of the assembly line. The factories products were exported to over 35 countries worldwide. In 1972 production of the EO-4321 fully rotating hydraulic excavator began. Once again, a mockup of the vehicle was placed by the gates of the plant By 1980, the main products of the plant were excavators. Production of combine harvesters, and other harvesting equipment and accessories were also produced.

==== Perestroika ====
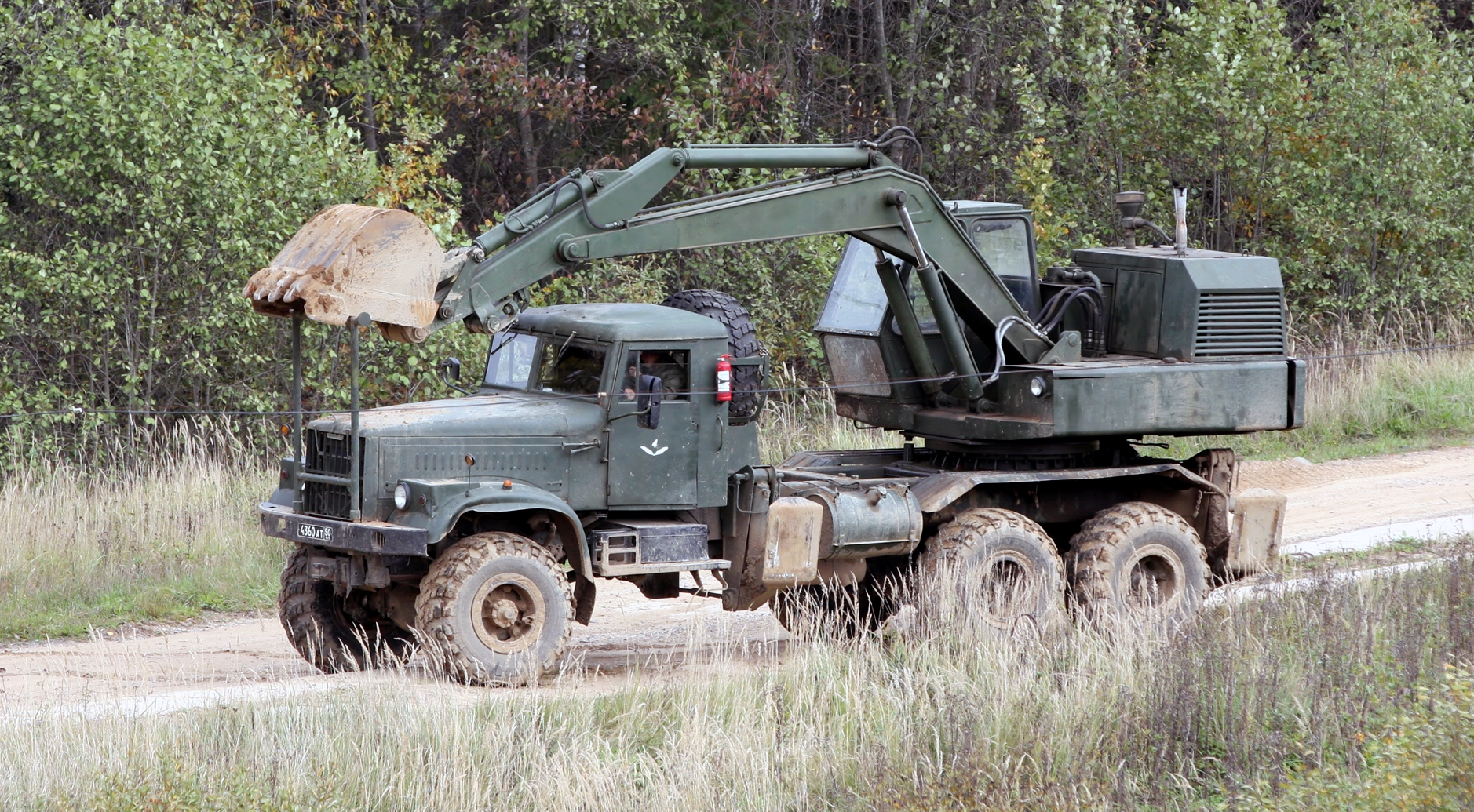
EOV-4421

In response to the Chernobyl disaster, several variants of the EOV-4422 military excavator were adapted to aid in the cleanup operation. The vehicle received a protected operator cabin with filters and ventilation. The model was designated EOV-4422KZ.

In 1990 as part of Perestroika, the production association was broken up, with all factories becoming independent private enterprises.

=== Ukraine ===
==== Independence ====
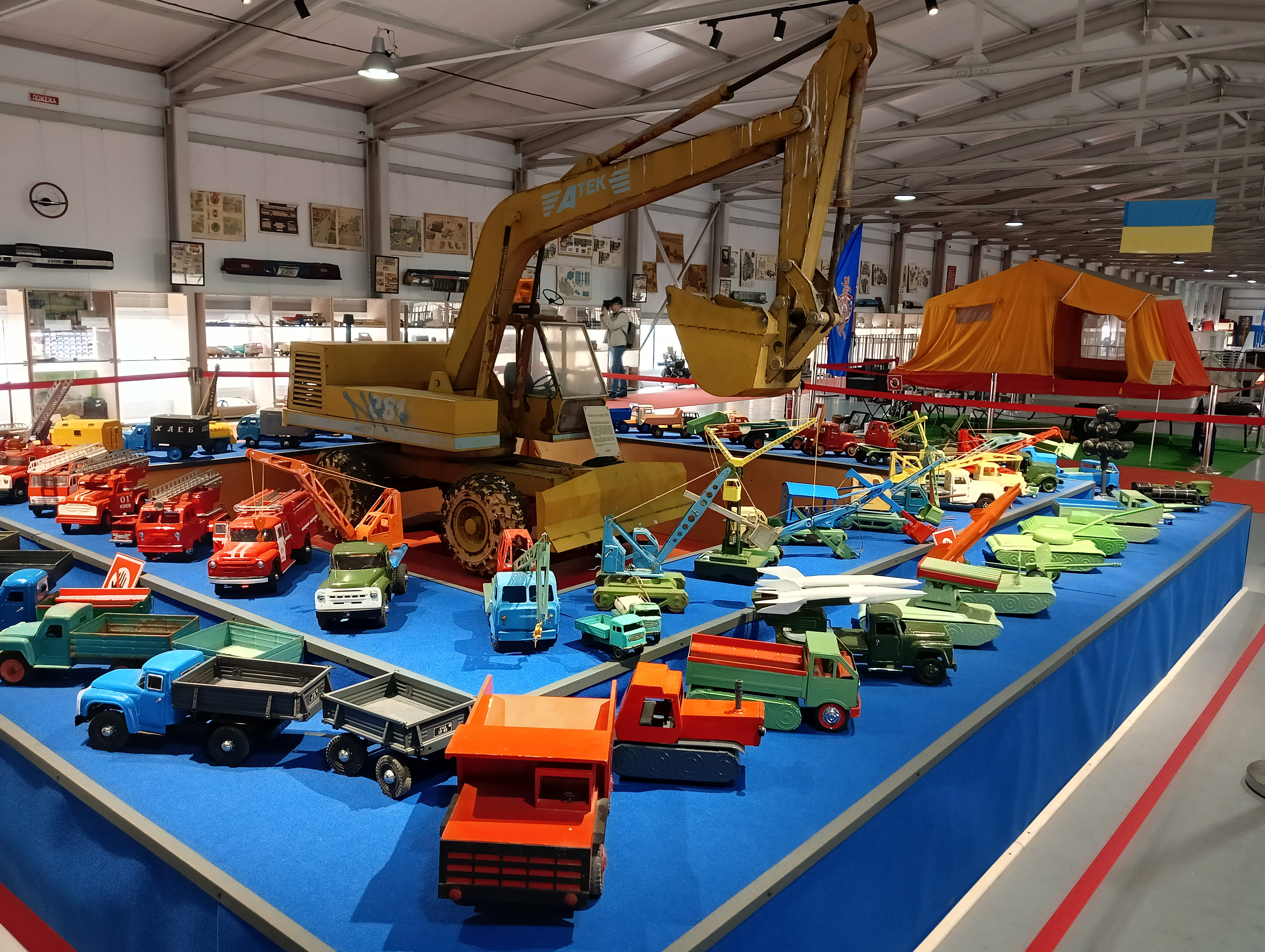
Former gate guardian Red Tractor EO-4321 (ATEK 881) at the Wheels of History Museum in Sviatoshyn.

In now independent Ukraine, Red Excavator became one of the first enterprises to undergo privatisation. In 1992, after seventy-three years in state control, the plant once again became a joint-stock company under the name ATEK Aktsionerne Ekskavator. From this point onwards, all the colour of all products would change from red to yellow. The factory cooperated with Western manufacturers and expanded its range, despite the economic turmoil of the 1990s. Starting with a lineup of excavators, ATEK went on to additionally produce bulldozers, graders, front loaders, cranes, and specialised equipment.

However, long-term financial problems persisted, leaving the company unable to repay debts and facing pressure from tax authorities. Management of the factory believed that the plant was being coveted by the Kyiv City Council due to the prominent land the enterprise occupied.

The EO-4321 mockup on the factory gates was modified to reflect the companies new branding, painted yellow and marked as ATEK 881. In 2021 it was removed, later appearing in the Wheels of History automotive museum in 2024, located near Sviatoshyn Airfield.

==== Collapse ====
In 2008 production at the factory was halted after electricity was cut by Kyivenerho due to outstanding debts of almost two million hryvnia. By 2010, the factory was effectively abandoned, with unusable equipment, broken buildings and a buildup of garbage. In 2012, the company was declared bankrupt by the Commercial Court of Kyiv City. In June 2014, the main shareholder, Andrii Nahrebelny (Andrei Nagrebelny) stated plans to redevelop the site into a technology park and mixed use area, partnering with KVV Group.

==== Azov Engineering ====
The former shareholder Nahrebelny had planned to revitalize the plant, but investor Yevhen Kazmin of KVV Group instead stripped it for metal, aided by Viktor Mikityon. On 22 November 2014, the derelict factory was forcefully seized by Mikityon and approximately 150 armed forces of the Azov Battalion, Georgian Legion as well as Special Police Forces of Ukraine, composed up of far-right members of the ultranationalist S14 organisation. Workers as well as children at the still open ATEK sports complex were reportedly violently threatened and forced to leave the site. During the raid, a fire broke out in one of the buildings of the factory. It was reported that the capture of the plant had been assisted by Roman Zvarych.

KVV group claimed that a controlling share had been acquired in ATEK from its former director Mykhailo Shcherbakov and his daughter Nataliia. This was denied by Nahrebelny. The Supreme Economic Court of Ukraine upheld Mikityon’s powers despite an appeal from Nahrebelny, enabling the raider takeover. In late 2014, it was reported that the "Charitable Foundation of Educational Innovation", representing Azov, had conducted an agreement with the interim administration of ATEK for the leasing of sections of the factory. In 2015 the office of the State Fiscal Service of Ukraine was barricaded by members of the Azov Regiment, after it refused to legally hand over control of the factory. In 2016 Anatolii Mazur, a former lawyer for KVV group confirmed that money had been transferred to Serhiy "Botsman" Korotkikh for the seizure of the factory by Azov, but later refused to hand the premises over to KVV group stating that "There is no law in this country but patriotism."

In early 2015, the Azov Engineering Group concern was set up in the ruins of the factory, under the leadership of Bohdan Zvarych. The group adopted a logo consisting of a black sun and Die Glocke, both allusions to esoteric neo-nazism. Publicity photos show a large wolfsangel located in one of the defunct factories buildings. Zvarych boasted that the Azov Regiment was the only volunteer unit with its own "tank factory". Shortly after, the group would be joined by Mykola Stepanov, a former technical director at the Kharkiv Malyshev Factory.

In November 2015, the Azovets armoured vehicle would be unveiled in a presentation involving the Ukrainian Ministry of Internal Affairs, as well as the Azov Regiment, with Arsen Avakov and Andriy Biletsky in attendance. The basis of the vehicle was a demilitarised T-64 tank that has been turned into a tractor. In an interview, Avakov stated that the vehicle would begin state tests shortly.

In early 2016, the group additionally unveiled conceptual plans for the T-Rex main battle tank. The tank would be based on the T-64 and would feature an unmanned turret, with a three person crew situated in an armoured cabin in the front of the hull, in a conceptually similar design to the Russian T-14 Armata. The concern stated hat it would be able to deliver up to 20 vehicles per month, reusing the hulls of Soviet era T-64 and T-72 tanks. However, based on statements from Bohdan Zvarych, the group were reportedly struggling to acquire a tank hull to create a prototype vehicle.

==== Colonel Yevhen Konovalets Military School ====
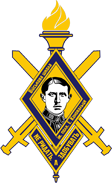
Military School named after Colonel Yevhen Konovalets

Following the expulsion of the Azov Engineering Group, which had now been renamed to Arey Engineering, the Azov Regiment began the conversion of the facility to the Colonel Yevhen Konovalets Military School, named after the founder of the Organization of Ukrainian Nationalists (ONU). It was stated that training accorded according to NATO standards, with instructors having received military education from the United States, Georgia and Estonia. The school however, existed outside the authority of the Armed Forces of Ukraine. However, it was later announced that the Ukrainian Ministry of Internal Affairs would recognise the certifications granted by the school. The school was opened by Andriy Biletsky on 17 April 2016, with the first commander of the school being Giorgi Kuparashvili, a veteran of the Georgian Special Operations Command.

On 23 March 2018, the Rapid Operational Response Unit (KORD) of the National Police of Ukraine conducted a raid on the site of the former factory grounds, with members of Azov, Right Sector and Svoboda barricading the site. The actions were carried out by the Department for Economic Protection under a court decision, involving document seizure in the factory's administrative building as part of a criminal investigation, later reported as related to alleged unlawful seizure of the ATEK factory property. The police raid was criticised by Andriy Biletsky and members of Azov, who accused the police of attempting to discredit "nationalist and patriotic forces.". Biletsky, in a threat to the authorities stated: "This is our house, which we built on the ruins. And we do not rent out our house. These animals dared to go to him and look for what is not there".

== Products ==
- ATEK 011/012 vehicle excavator
- ATEK 014 crane
- ATEK 035 combine harvester
- ATEK 351 bulldozer
- ATEK 381/382 pipeline repair vehicle
- ATEK 421 grader
- ATEK 621/671 loader
- ATEK 731/751/771 excavator
- ATEK 781/782 excavator
- ATEK 851 excavator
- ATEK 882/883 loader
- ATEK 999 stacker
- ATEK 1300 combine harvester
- E-153 excavator
- E-201 excavator
- E-202 excavator
- E-221 excavator
- E-1514 excavator
- E-1516 excavator
- EO-2515 excavator
- EO-2621 excavator
- EO-2624 excavator
- EO-4123 excavator
- EO-4321 excavator
- EO-4322 excavator
- EO-4421 excavator
- EO-5015 excavator
- EP-2324 excavator
- EOV-4421/4422 military excavator
- EM-161 bucket excavator
- EM-182 bucket excavator
- EM-302 bucket excavator
- EM-501/502 reclaimer
- ET-122 chain excavator
- ET-141/ET-142 drainage excavator
- S-135 coal loader
- SHU-500/800/1000 concreter
- SSSM-140 trencher excavator
- SSSM-738 concrete mixer
- SSSM-750 trencher excavator
- T-107 loader
- T-151 stacker
- T-183 stacker

== Sporting facilities ==
In 1960, the Red Tractor ice hockey team was formed.

== Awards ==
- Order of the Red Banner of Labour (1966)
