= Dejure Foundation =

Ukrainian non-governmental organisation promoting judicial reform

- Established: 2016 (10 years ago)
- Types: association
- Country: Ukraine
- Website: en.dejure.foundation

Dejure Foundation or Dejure (from the legal de jure or Democracy Justice Reforms), created in 2016, is a Ukrainian non-governmental organisation that promotes judicial reform in Ukraine. Dejure analyses judges' integrity based on their records and monitors legal developments related to the judiciary of Ukraine.

== Creation ==
Dejure Foundation was co-founded in 2016 by former judge of Vinnytsia District Court, Mykhailo Zhernakov, together with a former attorney and a civil society activist.

The name Dejure was chosen to have the double meaning of the legal term de jure and as an acronym for Democracy Justice Reforms.

== Aims and methods ==
Dejure aims at helping to reconstruct the judiciary of Ukraine in a way that reduces the level of corruption in the country. One of Dejure's methods is to collect information and the background, asset declarations, known real assets, and conduct of Ukrainian judges. Dejure also monitors proposed laws related to the Ukrainian judicial system.

== Leadership, membership and structure ==
Mykhailo Zhernakov is one of the 2016 co-founders of Dejure, and was chair of the Board As of July 2022. Iryna Shyba, a lawyer and feminist, has been the group's Executive Director since 2019.

As of 2020, Dejure had 17 members.

== Actions ==
Dejure was one of the non-governmental organisations that played a key role in helping to support the legal and practical creation of the High Anti-Corruption Court of Ukraine, one of the new anti-corruption institutions established in Ukraine in the 2010s. In 2020, the European Endowment for Democracy described Dejure's role in judicial reform in Ukraine as "crucial".

In 2020, Zhernakov of Dejure stated that many judges who had failed Dejure's integrity checks had not been dismissed, but "some of the most corrupt judges" had been removed as a result of Dejure's analyses, and Dejure's information distribution made "engag[ing] in illegal activities such as corruption or tax fraud ... more and more uncomfortable" for the judges. He felt that Dejure had "raised the integrity level" of Ukrainian judges.

In 2021, Dejure objected to the Ethics Council's decisions in confirming several judges to the High Council of Justice that Dejure and other civil society organisations, including Anti-Corruption Action Center, saw as having records lacking integrity and of having persecuted whistleblowers and anti-corruption activists. Dejure also objected to the Ethics Council's decision not to appoint Larysa Golnyk to the Supreme Council of Justice. Dejure described Golnyk as being seen by "many Ukrainians" as "the symbol of honesty, resilience and zero tolerance for any manifestations of corruption".

In 2022, during the 2022 Russian full-scale invasion of Ukraine, Zhernakov claimed that Ukrainian civil society had "played an outsized role in [Ukraine's] progress over the [preceding] few decades" and proved itself during the invasion as a significant component of Ukrainian society.

== Awards ==
In 2021, Dejure Foundation was the winner of Prospect's "Democracy and Law Award" and overall "Think Tank of the Year Award".
