= T40 =

T40 or T-40 may refer to:

== Aviation ==
- Allison T40, an American turboprop engine
- Lockheed T-40 JetStar, a proposed American jet trainer
- McGehee Catfish Restaurant Airport, Love County, Oklahoma, United States
- Turner T-40, an American homebuilt aircraft

== Automobiles ==
- Covini T40, an Italian sports car
- JAC T40, a Chinese SUV
- T-40 (tractor), a Soviet farm tractor

== Weapons and armour ==
- T-40 tank, a Soviet amphibious tank
- T40/M9 tank destroyer, an American gun motor carriage
- T40/M17 Whizbang, an American tank-based rocket launcher
- MKEK T-40, a Turkish grenade launcher

== Other uses ==
- T40 (classification), a disability sport classification
- IBM ThinkPad T40, a laptop
