= High Qualification Commission of Judges of Ukraine =

Ukrainian judicial governance body

- Вища кваліфікаційна комісія суддів України

Agency overview
- Formed: 1994
- Jurisdiction: Ukraine
- Headquarters: 9 Henerala Shapovala Street, Kyiv, Ukraine
- Agency executive: Andrii Pasichnyk, Chairman of the Commission
- Website: www.vkksu.gov.ua/en

The High Qualification Commission of Judges of Ukraine (Вища кваліфікаційна комісія суддів України, HQCJ) is a permanent body in the judiciary of Ukraine responsible for the selection and qualification assessment of judges. The Commission consists of 16 members appointed by the High Council of Justice from among judges and legal professionals following an open competition.

The High Qualification Commission of Judges of Ukraine was first introduced into Ukrainian legislation in 1994. Its role and functions have changed several times as part of Ukraine's judicial reforms.

== History ==
On 15 December 1989, the Presidium of the Verkhovna Rada of the Ukrainian SSR approved the regulation on qualification boards of judges of the courts of the Ukrainian SSR. These boards were formed from among judges of the Supreme Court of the Ukrainian SSR, regional courts and the courts of Kyiv. They assessed candidates for judicial office, conducted qualification attestation of judges and considered disciplinary matters concerning judges.

On 2 February 1994, the Verkhovna Rada adopted a law establishing a system of qualification commissions of judges of Ukraine. This system included qualification commissions of judges of general courts, arbitration courts and military courts, as well as the High Qualification Commission of Judges of Ukraine.

In 2002, the Law of Ukraine "On the Judiciary of Ukraine" defined a new system of qualification commissions, including the High Qualification Commission of Judges of Ukraine.

In 2010, the Law of Ukraine "On the Judiciary and the Status of Judges" left only the High Qualification Commission of Judges of Ukraine in the system of qualification commissions and defined its new powers.

In 2016, a new Law of Ukraine "On the Judiciary and the Status of Judges" was adopted. It provided for a restart of the Commission and established the Public Integrity Council, which was intended to assist the Commission in assessing judges.

In 2019, a new law provided for the dissolution of the Commission and a new procedure for forming it. However, the competition for the new Commission was blocked by the High Council of Justice. In March 2020, the Constitutional Court of Ukraine invalidated part of the provisions of the law.

On 13 July 2021, the Verkhovna Rada adopted a law aimed at restoring the work of the High Qualification Commission of Judges of Ukraine.

The competition for the Commission began in September 2021, was interrupted for six months in 2022 after the beginning of the full-scale Russian invasion of Ukraine, and was completed on 15 March 2023. The competition commission, half of whose members were international experts, selected 32 candidates from 301 participants.

In June 2022, the European Commission included the formation of a new High Qualification Commission of Judges of Ukraine among the requirements for Ukraine in connection with opening negotiations on accession to the European Union after Ukraine obtained candidate status.

On 1 June 2023, the High Council of Justice appointed 16 members of the Commission from among 32 previously selected candidates.

On 6 June 2023, the newly appointed Commission held its first organizational meeting. Roman Ihnatov was elected Chairman of the Commission, Ruslan Sydorovych was elected Deputy Chairman, and Serhii Chumak and Ruslan Melnyk were elected secretaries of the chambers.

On 7 August 2024, Andrii Pasichnyk was elected Chairman of the Commission. On 6 August 2025, he was re-elected as Chairman for a one-year term.

== Powers ==
Under the Law of Ukraine "On the Judiciary and the Status of Judges", the High Qualification Commission of Judges of Ukraine, among other things:

- keeps records of the number of judicial positions in courts, including vacant positions;
- conducts the selection of candidates for judicial office;
- organizes special checks of candidates for judicial office;
- conducts qualification examinations;
- submits recommendations to the High Council of Justice on the appointment of candidates to judicial office;
- submits recommendations on the transfer of judges to other courts;
- determines the needs for state-funded professional training of judicial candidates at the National School of Judges of Ukraine;
- conducts qualification assessment of judges;
- ensures the maintenance of judicial dossiers and candidate dossiers.

== Composition ==
The Commission consists of 16 members. Eight members are appointed from among judges or retired judges. Members of the Commission are appointed by the High Council of Justice for a four-year term following a competition conducted by a specially established competition commission.

The Commission elects its Chairman and Deputy Chairman by a majority vote of its members.

=== Chambers ===
The Commission has two chambers, each composed of eight members. The Chairman and Deputy Chairman of the Commission serve as the heads of the chambers. The Commission also elects secretaries of both chambers.

Until 2023, the Commission had a chamber for selection and public service of judges and a qualification chamber. By decisions of the newly appointed Commission of 6 June 2023, they were reorganized into the First Chamber and the Second Chamber with equal powers.

=== Current members ===
According to the official website of the Commission, the members of the Commission are divided between the First Chamber and the Second Chamber.

Name	Position	Chamber
Andrii Pasichnyk	Chairman of the Commission; Head of the First Chamber	First Chamber
Serhii Chumak	Secretary of the First Chamber	First Chamber
Yaroslav Dukh	Member of the Commission	First Chamber
Roman Kydysiuk	Member of the Commission	First Chamber
Oleksii Omelian	Member of the Commission	First Chamber
Ihor Kushnir	Member of the Commission	First Chamber
Roman Sabodash	Member of the Commission	First Chamber
Ruslan Sydorovych	Member of the Commission	First Chamber
Oleh Koliush	Deputy Chairman of the Commission; Head of the Second Chamber	Second Chamber
Ruslan Melnyk	Secretary of the Second Chamber	Second Chamber
Mykhailo Bohonis	Member of the Commission	Second Chamber
Lyudmyla Volkova	Member of the Commission	Second Chamber
Vitalii Gatseliuk	Member of the Commission	Second Chamber
Nadiia Kobetska	Member of the Commission	Second Chamber
Volodymyr Luhanskyi	Member of the Commission	Second Chamber
Halyna Shevchuk	Member of the Commission	Second Chamber

== Chairmen ==
- Serhii Koziakov, 2014–2019
- Roman Ihnatov, 2023–2024
- Andrii Pasichnyk, from 2024

== Secretariat ==
Organizational support for the work of the Commission is provided by its Secretariat. The structure of the Secretariat is determined by the Commission.

The Secretariat also includes a service of inspectors who assist members of the Commission in performing their duties.

== See also ==
- Judiciary of Ukraine
- Judicial reform in Ukraine
- High Council of Justice
- Constitutional Court of Ukraine
- Supreme Court of Ukraine
