= Vsevolod Kniaziev =

Ukrainian judge

- Всеволод Князєв
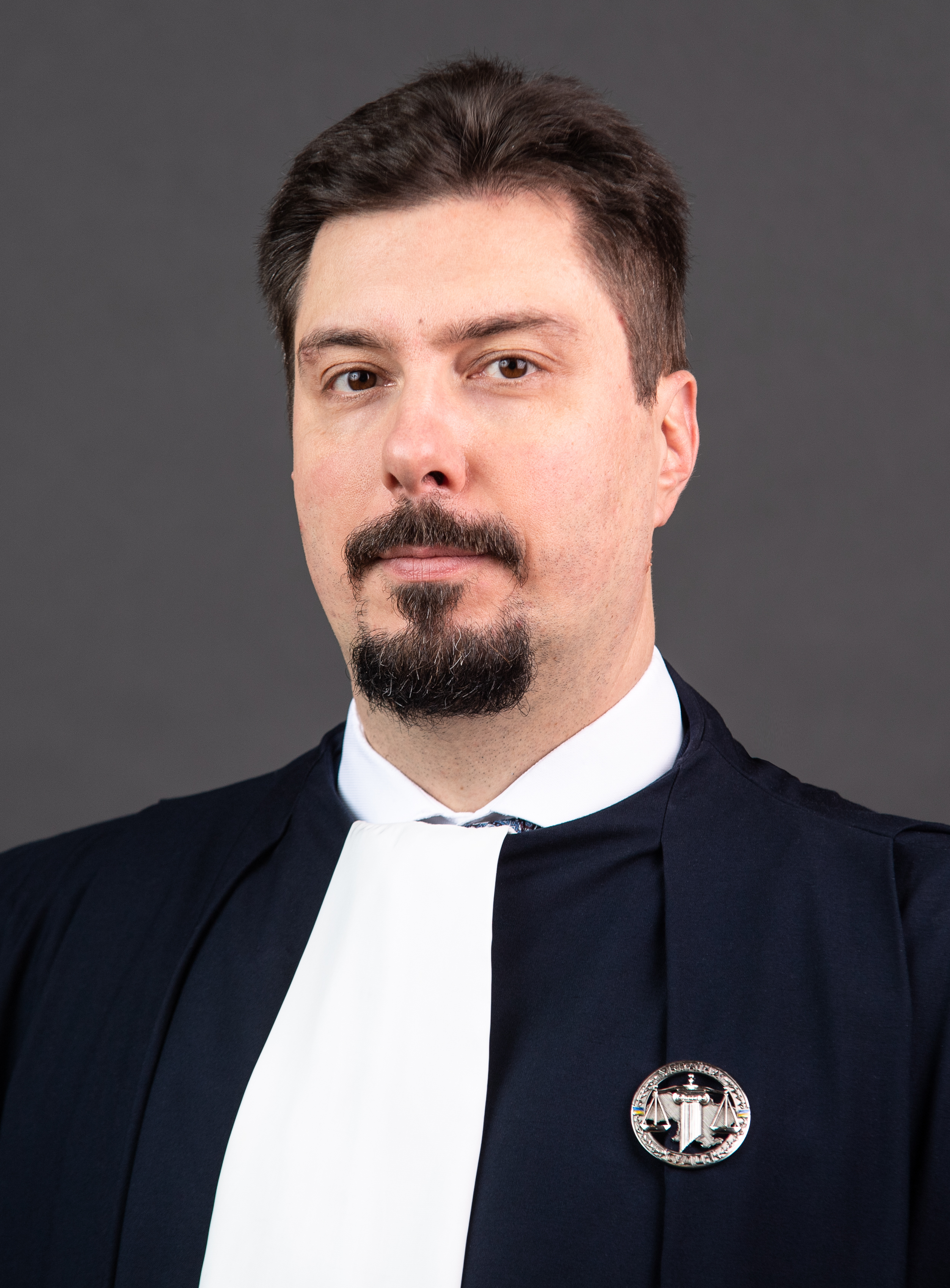
- Official portrait, 2021

President of the Supreme Court of Ukraine
- In office 1 December 2021 – 16 May 2023
- President: Volodymyr Zelenskyy
- Preceded by: Valentyna Danishevska
- Succeeded by: Dmytro Luspenyk (acting); Stanislav Kravchenko

Personal details
- Born: 25 May 1979 (age 47) Mykolaiv, Ukrainian SSR, Soviet Union (now Ukraine)
- Spouse: Yuliia Anatoliivna Kniazieva
- Children: daughter and son
- Education: National University Odesa Law Academy
- Occupation: Judge (until 6 August 2024)

Vsevolod Serhiiovych Kniaziev (Ukrainian: Всеволод Сергійович Князєв; born 25 May 1979) is a Ukrainian judge who served as the President of the Supreme Court from 1 December 2021 until 16 May 2023. He was a judge of the Grand Chamber of the Supreme Court until 6 August 2024. Kniazev was detained on 15 May 2023 while allegedly receiving a bribe. He was dismissed as President of the Supreme Court the following day.

== Youth and studies ==
Kniaziev was born on 25 May 1979 in the southern Ukrainian city of Mykolaiv. He graduated from the Mykolaiv Нumanitarian Institute of the Ukrainian State Maritime Technical University and the National University Odesa Law Academy. In 2001, he received the right to practice law, which was suspended in 2023. Kniaziev obtained his PhD in law in 2011.

== Academic career ==
Kniaziev became an associate professor in 2014 and a professor in 2021.

== Legal career ==
He worked as a legal adviser, a lecturer at the Admiral Makarov National University of Shipbuilding, and a lawyer.

Since 2013, he started working as a judge of the Mykolaiv District Administrative Court, and in 2015 he became the president of this court.

Vsevolod Kniaziev is a judge of the Cassation Administrative Court within the Supreme Court, established after the reform of 2016.

On 12 December 2017, Vsevolod Kniaziev was elected Secretary of the Grand Chamber of the Supreme Court.

On 22 October 2021, the Plenum of the Supreme Court elected a new President of this institution by secret ballot. It was Kniaziev, who was voted for by 98 colleagues. He began exercising his powers on 1 December.

== Corruption case ==
On 15 May 2023, on the orders of the National Anti-Corruption Bureau of Ukraine and Specialized Anti-Corruption Prosecutor's Office, Kniazev was detained while allegedly receiving a $2.7m bribe. The following day a plenary session of the Supreme Court, voting 140–2, expressed no confidence in (until then Chairman of the Supreme Court) Kniazev, making him dismissed from his position as chairman. Kniazev remains a Judge and denies any wrongdoing.

Lawyer, Oleh Horetsky, allegedly the intermediary between Kniazev and Kostyantyn Zhevago who had allegedly paid the money to Kniazev to obtain a favourable decision for Ferrexpo, was also arrested. It is reported that the alleged bribe was to be split between 10 or more Supreme Court judges. Kostyantyn Zhevago is currently in France with Ukraine seeking his extradition.

An entity titled "back office" was uncovered, purportedly pretending to be a legal firm, that was acting as a route through which parties could aim to achieve a decision in their favour by paying for "legal services" or "mediation services". Money received would be distributed to judges. It had reportedly been operating for some time and for a number of different courts across Ukraine.

Detention is to continue until 16 October, however bail has been offered.

The mobile phone of Kniazev was sent by the prosecutor to Poland to be unlocked and the data preserved, an act that itself is illegal and the prosecutor has been removed from the case and demoted. The phone has been unlocked.

In December 2023 Kniaziev was found guilty of receiving the gift of the use of an apartment in Kyiv for Hr 1,000 ($26) a month which had a market value of around $2,000 per month, the $24,000 bribe was seized from Kniaziev. Other corruption charges are pending.

On 8 June 2026, Kniaziev was sentenced to five years' imprisonment after he entered into a plea-bargain agreement.

== Personal life ==
Kniaziev is fluent in Ukrainian, English and Russian. Kniaziev's wife Yuliia is a private notary. He has a daughter Viktoriia and a son Volodymyr.
