= Ethics Council =

- Етична рада
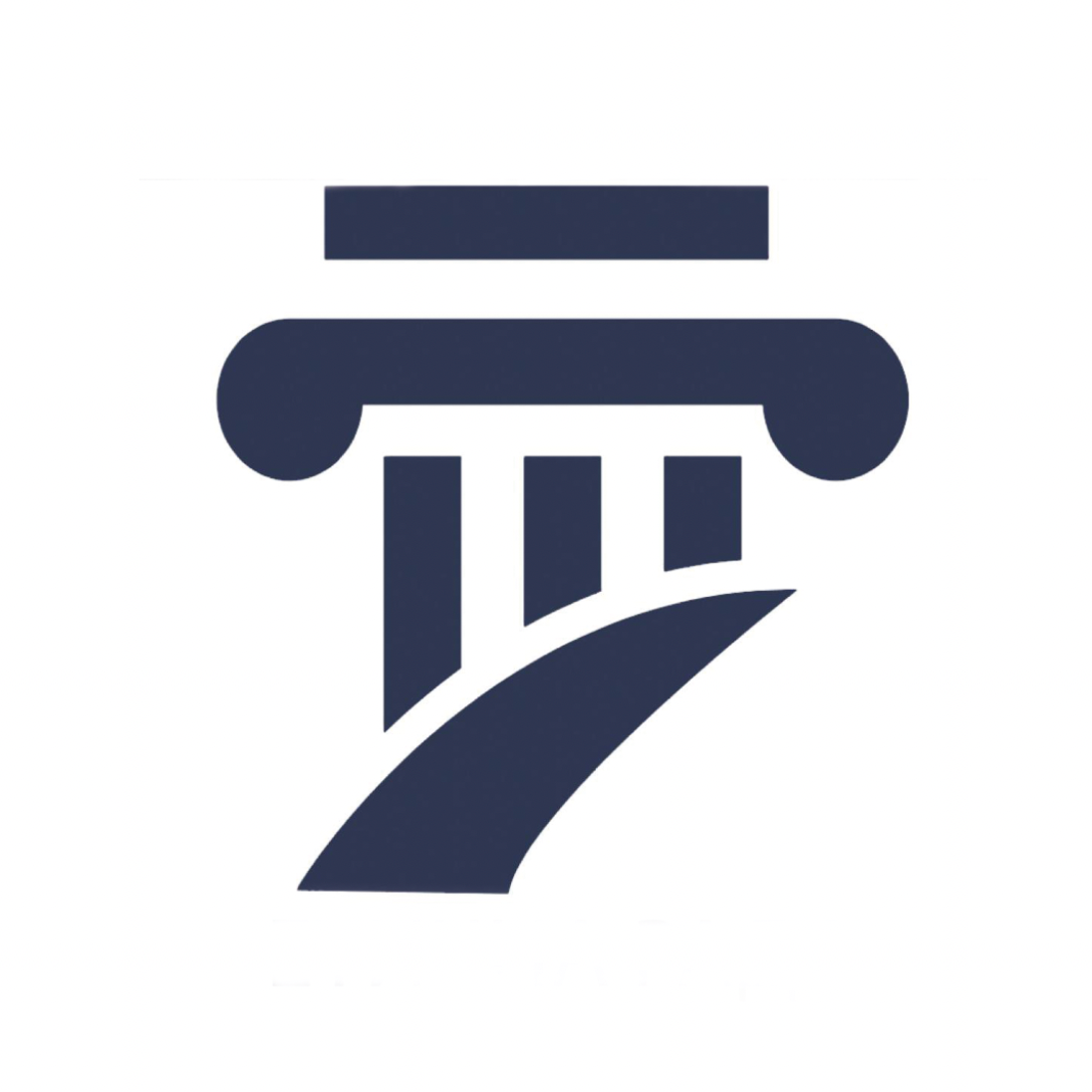

Agency overview
- Formed: 5 August 2021; 5 years ago
- Jurisdiction: Ukraine
- Agency executive: Lev Kyshakevych, Chairman
- Website: court.gov.ua/eng/ec/

In Ukraine, the Ethics Council is a legal body of three Ukrainian and three international members created in 2021 to appoint members of the High Council of Justice. Anti-corruption organisations AutoMaidan, Dejure, and Anti-Corruption Action Center criticised the council's June 2022 appointments as including "tainted" judges and for refusing a well-known anti-corruption judge and whistleblower, Larysa Golnyk.

== Legal basis ==
The Ukrainian Ethics Council was legally defined by Ukrainian law No. 1635-IX, "On amendments to certain legislative acts of Ukraine concerning the procedure for selection (appointment) to the positions of members of the High Council of Justice and the activities of disciplinary inspectors of the High Council of Justice".

== Members ==
According to the law, the Ethics Council consists of 6 members, including three members nominated by the Council of Judges of Ukraine from among judges or retired judges, and three members nominated by the Council of Prosecutors of Ukraine, Bar Council of Ukraine, and National Academy of Legal Sciences of Ukraine (each of them nominating one member respectively).

At the same time, according to the law the first composition of the Ethics Council includes three members nominated by the Council of Judges of Ukraine and three other members nominated by international and foreign organizations which have provided international technical assistance to Ukraine for the previous five years in the sphere of the judiciary reform and/or prevention and action against corruption.

As of 2021, the Ukrainian members are Supreme Court judge Lev Kyshakevych, Kyiv Court of Appeal judge Yuriy Tryasun, and retired judge Volodymyr Siverin; and the three international members are British retired judge Anthony Hooper, United States retired judge Robert J. Cordy and former Estonian prosecutor-general Lavly Perling. The member of the Ethics Council are appointed for six years, without the right of reappointment.

The Ethics Council is considered to be fully competent in case it consists of at least four members.

== Responsibilities ==
The Ethics Council is responsible for selecting members of the High Council of Justice (also called the Supreme Council of Justice). Decisions on appointments require four votes of support, except if the vote is split equally between international and Ukrainian members of the council, in which case the international members' preference has precedence.

== Controversies ==
Ukrainian anti-corruption organisations criticised the Ethics Council's June 2022 decisions in confirming Supreme Council of Justice membership of existing members Inna Plakhtiy, Oksana Blazhivska, and Vitaly Salikhov. AutoMaidan, Dejure, and Anti-Corruption Action Center stated that Plakhtiy, Blazhivska and Salikhov had "violated asset declaration rules, refused to punish numerous judges implicated in corruption, and persecuted whistleblowers and anti-corruption crusaders". The three organisations also claimed that Vyacheslav Talko and Olena Zaichko, who were approved by the Ethics Council, did not meet ethics and integrity standards.

AutoMaidan, Dejure, and Anti-Corruption Action Center also criticised the Ethics Council's June 2022 refusal to appoint anti-corruption campaigner and judge Larysa Golnyk to the Supreme Council of Justice. The organisations stated, "For many Ukrainians [Golnyk] has become the symbol of honesty, resilience and zero tolerance for any manifestations of corruption. We believe that this decision by the Ethics Council is absolutely mistaken and kills the trust in the process and results of the Ethics Council's work."

Oleg Sukhov of The Kyiv Independent speculated that the international members of the Ethics Council lacked knowledge of Ukrainian political and judicial institutions and that the council's lack of contact with anti-corruption organisations led to the foreign members being manipulated by "Ukrainian kleptocrats".

== Results of work ==
As of 9 November 2022 the Ethics Council managed to evaluate 4 members of the HCJ within the framework of one-time evaluation and 83 candidates, including 14 candidates nominated by the Verkhovna Rada of Ukraine, 9 candidates nominated by the Congress of Representatives of Legal Higher Educational Institutions and Research Institutions, as well as 60 candidates nominated by the Congress of Judges of Ukraine. As a result of that, 27 candidates to the position of the HCJ member were found to be compliant with the professional ethics and integrity criteria, while 33 were found to be non-compliant. 23 candidates withdrew from the competition including 17 after the interview and other 6 before the interview.

Currently there is an ongoing competition for vacant positions of the HCJ members under the quota of the Conference of Prosecutors and President of Ukraine, in which 14 candidates from each of the bodies take part.

On 24 October 2022 the Venice Commission and the Directorate General of Human Rights and Rule of Law (DGI) of the Council of Europe positively evaluated activities of the Ethics Council and the law on the reform of the High Council of Justice. In particular, the opinion mentions that the loss of the quorum in the HCJ was caused not by the Ethics Council's decisions, but rather by “large-scale” resignation of the HCJ members even before the check by the Ethics Council.

On 9 November 2022 Ambassadors of the Group of Seven congratulated the Ethics Council on its achievements in promotion of the rule of law in Ukraine.

== See also ==
- Oleksandr Klymenko (detective) - nominee for head of the Specialized Anti-Corruption Prosecutor's Office via an open competition, as of 19 July 2022
