= Martyna Bohuslavets =

Ukrainian anti-corruption activist, lawyer and investigative journalist

Martyna Petrivna Bohuslavets (born 20 August 1989) is a Ukrainian lawyer, anti-corruption activist and investigative journalist. She is the founder and head of the Anti-Corruption Center MEZHA and the creator of the investigative programme Na mezhi ("On the Edge") on Suspilne and 24 Kanal. In 2024 she was awarded the Order of Merit, 3rd class.

== Early life and education ==
Bohuslavets was born in Lviv to a family of doctors. In 2013 she graduated from the University of Lviv with a master's degree in law. She later completed anti-corruption training at the National University of Kyiv-Mohyla Academy and the international programme "Specialized Anti-Corruption Courts" in Slovakia.

== Career ==
From 2015 to 2019 Bohuslavets was legal adviser to Yehor Sobolev, chair of the Verkhovna Rada anti-corruption committee, and worked on draft legislation including the bill on establishing anti-corruption courts. From 2017 to 2024 she was co-founder and executive director of the think tank Institute of Legislative Ideas. From 2023 to 2025 she was a member of the Public Integrity Council, which assesses the integrity of judges and judicial candidates.

In 2024 she founded the Anti-Corruption Center MEZHA. Since 2025 she has hosted Na mezhi. Several of its investigations were followed by criminal charges, suspensions or dismissals of officials. In 2026 she was named a laureate of the Ukrainska Pravda award "UP 100: Power of Women" in the Society category.
