= Larysa Golnyk =

Judge at Oktyabrysky District Court

Personal details
- Known for: opposition to judicial corruption

Larysa Golnyk is a Ukrainian judge at Oktyabrysky District Court in Poltava. She is a whistleblower against corruption of the Ukrainian judiciary. Golnyk was refused membership of the Ukrainian High Council of Justice by the Ethics Council in June 2022 because of a Facebook post in which she criticised her colleagues for an illegal re-election of the chair of the Oktyabrsky District Court.

== Judge ==
As of July 2022, Golnyk has been a judge in Oktyabrsky District Court in Poltava since 2015 or earlier.

== Whistleblowing ==
In 2015, Golnyk published two videos showing attempts to pressure her to close a case of alleged corruption by Oleksandr Mamay, mayor of Poltava at the time, under the Administrative Code of Ukraine. One video showed Mamay pressuring Golnyk and the other showed Mamay's ex-deputy offering a bribe for Golnyk to close the case.

According to Golnyk, persons charged are expected to appear at court hearings, but Mamay avoided most of the hearings in his case, only appearing twice in nine months, both times brought to court by force. Golnyk also stated that Mamay published Golnyk's private telephone number, home address and other private information without permission and lodged criminal complaints against Golnyk.

On 26 January 2015, Mamay claimed that Golnyk had required Mamay to pay her five thousand dollars to close the case. Golnyk stated that she continued pursuing the Mamay case, that the criminal cases against her were successively closed, and that by 2018, the National Anti-Corruption Bureau of Ukraine (NABU) started investigating the case.

=== Reactions ===
In 2017, Golnyk was beaten by attackers who were not identified. Golnyk interprets the attack as revenge for her whistleblowing. Golnyk accused the chair of Oktyabrsky Court, Oleksandr Strukov of assaulting her in relation to the Mamay case.

In 2020, Petro Poroshenko was legally required to convert Golnyk's status to a lifetime appointment, but did not do so. Golnyk's lawyer Roman Maselko interpreted the failure to confirm the lifetime appointment as possibly being "a signal from the president to a disloyal judge".

In November 2020, Golnyk described the reactions to her whistleblowing, stating "The system ... [is] trying to expel and neutralize me and people like me. I didn't think our struggle would be so long, exhausting, and far-reaching. But we must continue ... and win."

== Facebook post(s) ==
In 2021, Anti-corruption Action Center accused the High Council of Justice of "punishing" Golnyk for a post on Facebook by preventing her from being a candidate for the High Anti-Corruption Court of Ukraine.

In June 2022, the Ukrainian Ethics Council refused Golnyk membership in the High Council of Justice, on the grounds that she had published a Facebook post criticising other members of the Oktyabrsky Court for re-electing Oleksandr Strukov as chair of the court. The re-election of Strukov to a fifth term as chair was illegal, since court chairs can only be elected for at most two terms under Ukrainian law. Golnyk compared her colleagues to sheep in the post.

== Awards ==
In 2018, Golnyk was named as one of the top five "reformers of the year" by Kyiv Post.

== Views ==
In 2018, Golnyk described the "degradation" of judicial institutions in Ukraine as "a real threat to the future of Ukraine's statehood". She stated that "some judges carry out their direct responsibilities only under attentive external control exercised by the public, mass media, politicians and other authorities".

== See also ==
- Corruption in Ukraine
- 2020–2022 Ukrainian constitutional crisis
