= Pavlo Kulyk =

Ukrainian public servant, analyst and artist

- Павло Олексійович Кулик
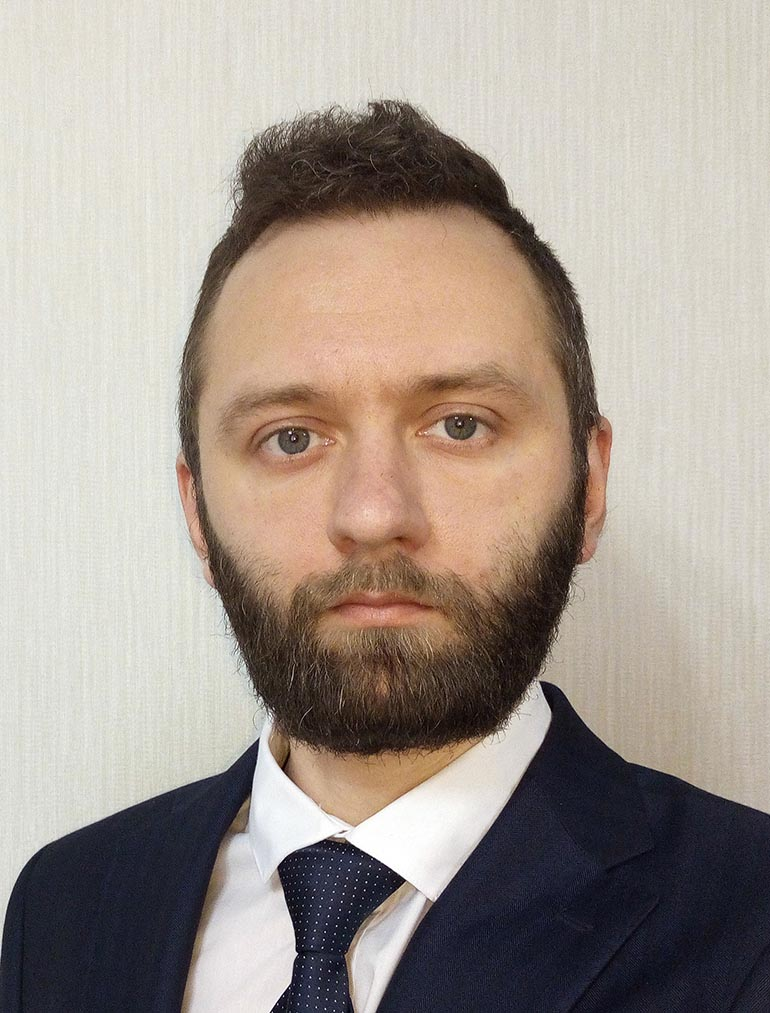
- Kulyk in 2017
- Born: 1982 or 1983 (age 43)
- Occupations: Public servant, analyst, artist
- Known for: War & Art database of artworks linked to sanctioned Russian individuals
- Website: chaotism.art

Pavlo Oleksiyovych Kulyk (Павло Олексійович Кулик) is a Ukrainian public servant, analyst and artist. At the National Agency on Corruption Prevention he led the team behind War & Art, a public database of artworks linked to sanctioned Russian individuals, which Der Spiegel profiled in 2023. Since 2025 he has been Deputy Head of the Secretariat for Digital Development, Digital Transformation and Digitalization of the High Qualification Commission of Judges of Ukraine.

== Military service ==
Kulyk, an economist by training, was conscripted in 2015 during the War in Donbas and spent a year and a half mapping front lines in Donbas.

== War & Art ==
At the National Agency on Corruption Prevention (NACP), Kulyk headed a team of about ten people in Kyiv that compiled War & Art, a publicly accessible database of artworks believed to be owned by Russian individuals under sanctions. By November 2023 the team had linked more than 1,300 works to sanctioned persons, drawing on press reports, auction catalogues, videos and tips from insiders, as well as on reporting about leaked documents concerning the art collection of Roman Abramovich.

In an article published as part of the Cyprus Confidential investigation, Der Spiegel described how Kulyk identified Pyotr Konchalovsky's painting The Workbench in the background of a video interview with the sanctioned banker Pyotr Aven, and how he traced a 1990 abstract painting by Gerhard Richter to Abramovich's London home. Kulyk argued that such works should be seized and sold to fund the reconstruction of Ukraine, holding that the oligarchs share responsibility for Russia's invasion; Der Spiegel noted that states imposing sanctions are not permitted to sell confiscated art.

In 2023 the Danish investigative outlet Danwatch also quoted Kulyk in an article about the War & Art database and the documentation of Ukrainian cultural heritage stolen by Russia. A 2024 article in the International Journal of Digital Humanities analysing the NACP's War & Sanctions and War & Art databases acknowledged Kulyk as head of the agency's analysis department.

== High Qualification Commission of Judges ==
On 29 January 2025, the High Qualification Commission of Judges of Ukraine adopted a decision to appoint Kulyk as Deputy Head of the Secretariat for Digital Development, Digital Transformation and Digitalization, effective from 5 February 2025. The Commission also assigned him the third rank of public service.

== Artistic work ==
Kulyk has been presented by Hromadske Radio as an artist and appeared as a guest in broadcasts connected with Ukrainian art projects related to the war, including the exhibitions Maky and Mystetstvo nezalezhnosti.

Kulyk maintains a profile on Saatchi Art, where his paintings are presented.

On his own website, Kulyk describes Chaotism as an artistic process in which random lines form the basis for recognizing shapes and developing a final composition.
