= Judicial reform in Ukraine =

Judicial reform in Ukraine is a set of legislative, institutional and personnel changes aimed at improving the Judiciary of Ukraine.

The reform was launched in 2014 after the Revolution of Dignity and the 2014 Ukrainian presidential election. The purpose of the reform is to bring the judiciary of Ukraine to European standards and to ensure the protection of the rights, freedoms and legitimate interests of citizens through timely, effective and fair resolution of legal disputes on the basis of the rule of law.

== Background ==
After Ukraine gained independence in 1991, the authorities were faced with the task of dismantling the outdated Soviet judicial system and creating a new one based on the principles of the rule of law and the protection of citizens' rights and freedoms. In 1992, the Concept of Judicial and Legal Reform was adopted, and in 1994, the Law on the Status of Judges was adopted. In 1996, the Verkhovna Rada approved the Constitution of Ukraine, which enshrined the division of state power into three branches: legislative, executive and judicial.

In general, the initial period of reforms was characterized by the consolidation of basic world standards for the independence of judges and the independence of the judiciary in Ukraine. But despite the positive legislative changes, the idea of building an independent judiciary was virtually ignored by the higher authorities. Political forces used the courts to their advantage, corruption flourished in the system, and the judiciary became financially dependent on the executive.

Opinion polls of judges, lawyers and prosecutors showed a significant decline in confidence in Ukrainian courts. If from 1991 to 1996 the independence of the judiciary increased from 66% to 78%, then from 2002 to 2009 it fell from 74% to 40%.

During Viktor Yanukovych's presidency, the reputation of Ukraine's judiciary has deteriorated significantly due to high-profile cases by politicians in opposition to the current government, most notably Yulia Tymoshenko and Yuriy Lutsenko. As the most controversial decisions were made by the Pechersk District Court of Kyiv, the idiom "Pechersk justice" spread in Ukraine, which meant passing unjust, politically motivated verdicts.

Particularly harsh criticism was voiced by human rights organizations. For example, a 2011 Human Rights Watch report stated that "Yulia Tymoshenko's conviction, as well as arrests and trials of other former government officials, have undermined confidence in the independence of the judiciary."

== The beginning of the reform ==
In May 2014, Petro Poroshenko was elected President of Ukraine, in whose election program the reform of the judiciary was identified as one of the key tasks. Borys Lozhkin, ex-co-owner of the UMH group, was appointed as Head of the Presidential Administration. His deputy was Oleksiy Filatov, a partner at the law firm Vasyl Kysil & Partners, which specializes in resolving investment, corporate and banking disputes. In 2013, Filatov was engaged in legal support of the agreement on the sale of UMH.

Oleksiy Filatov's main task in the civil service was to ensure judicial reform. He was the coordinator of the Judicial Reform Council, an advisory body to the President of Ukraine formed in the autumn of 2014. The Council included ministers, judges, lawyers, scholars, activists, and scientists.

The tasks of the Council were: preparation of proposals on the strategy of reforming the judiciary; establishing cooperation between state bodies, civil society and international organizations on the preparation of judicial reform; monitoring the implementation and analysis of the effectiveness of the reform; informing the public and the international community about the progress of the reform.

== Amendments to the Constitution and laws of Ukraine ==
Judicial reform required amendments to the Constitution of Ukraine, as well as to a number of laws related to the judicial system. The Constitutional Commission, established by a presidential decree in April 2015, drafted amendments to the Basic Law. The commission consisted of more than 60 people: lawyers, scientists, MPs, public figures. Constitutional changes were developed in cooperation with the Venice Commission.

On July 2, 2016, the Verkhovna Rada adopted amendments to the Constitution: they were supported by 335 deputies with the required minimum of 300 votes. On this same day, the Law "On the Judiciary and the Status of Judges" was enacted, establishing a new framework for the judiciary directed at aligning Ukraine with European standards; the law especially emphasized the rule of law and the right to a fair trial.

Other laws adopted as part of judicial reform include the Law on Amendments to the Commercial Procedural Code of Ukraine, the Civil Procedure Code of Ukraine, the Code of Administrative Procedure of Ukraine and other legislative acts, the Law on Ensuring the Right to a Fair Trial, and the Law on the Supreme Court. The adoption of the law "On Advocacy" is expected.

== Depoliticization ==
An important step in the reform was the removal of the Verkhovna Rada from the appointment and dismissal of judges. These powers were vested in the High Council of Justice, an independent body of the judiciary.

The High Council of Justice consists of 21 members. Ten of them are elected by the Congress of Judges of Ukraine from among retired or not retired judges, two are appointed by the President of Ukraine, two are elected by the Verkhovna Rada of Ukraine, two are elected by the All-Ukrainian Conference of Prosecutors, two are elected by Congress of representatives of legal universities and research institutions. The President of the Supreme Court is an ex-officio member of the High Council of Justice.

== Qualification assessment of judges ==
The initiators of the reform paid great attention to the personnel issue in order to overcome corruption among judges and increase public confidence in the profession. Judges were deprived of full immunity, which prevented them from being prosecuted for violating the law and the principles of fair justice. For the first time in the history of Ukraine, lawyers and scholars were able to apply for the positions of judges.

Each judge had to go through a qualification assessment procedure, both for new candidates for positions in the courts and for those judges who had already worked in the judiciary before the reform. A special body was created for this purpose - the High Qualification Commission of Judges. It included judges, lawyers and scholars.

The Public Integrity Council was established in 2016 to involve the public in the evaluation process of judges. Its purpose is to assist the High Qualifications Commission of Judges in establishing the compliance of candidates for the position of judges with the criteria of professional ethics and goodness.

== Atittude towards the reform ==
A September 2017 USAID survey found a relatively positive attitude toward Ukraine's judiciary. From the point of view of lawyers, the judicial system received the highest level of trust from all authorities - 38%. For comparison: only 12% of lawyers trusted the parliament and the government. The level of trust in the courts among ordinary citizens from 2015 to 2017 increased from 5% to 12%, while the parliament and government in 2017 were trusted by 8% and 10%.

The head of the Venice Commission, Gianni Buquicchio, compared judicial reform in Ukraine to the revolution of Nicolaus Copernicus in science.

The curator of judicial reform, Oleksiy Filatov, was satisfied with its progress, but at the same time stated that establishing fair trials would not be enough for full reform. According to Filatov, it was also necessary to reform the prosecutor's office and legal education.

== Successes of the Reform ==
The creation of the High Anti-Corruption Court of Ukraine (HACC) in 2019 showcased a step in combatting corruption by adjudicating high-profile cases of official misconduct. The HACC has allowed for the prosecution of MPs, former Fiscal Service heads, mayors, and other prominent officials, a direct attempt to confront entrenched corruption. Additionally, mounting social pressure following the 2014 Revolution of Dignity catalyzed greater transparency through the introduction of a new electronic asset and interest disclosure system, forcing judges to disclose their assets, income, and expenditures. This disclosure requirement culminated in the resignation of around 1,000 judges. Paired with new comprehensive qualification assessment procedures, judicial reforms underscored the importance of the judiciary's integrity and professionalism.

== Challenges ==
Mykhailo Zhernakov, Director of the Dejure Foundation has criticized Ukraine's judicial system as continuously inefficient, underscoring its stagnant-decision making processes and high caseloads. According to the Ministry of Justice, only 20% of judgements are carried out, showcasing serious issues with the system's functionality. Moreover, the reforms' various attempts at reducing political influence have not entirely succeeded; the executive branch continues to exert significant control over the Ukrainian judiciary, undermining judicial impartiality and independence. Similarly, corruption persists within the judicial branch of Ukraine despite the reforms' efforts to increase transparency, obstructing the administration of justice. Additionally, some of the reforms emerged as problematic. The most notable example, "Lozovyi's Amendments," installed a new statute of limitations, altering the time frame within which legal action could be initiated. Originally intended to streamline the legal process, the amendments ultimately resulted in the dismissal of several high-profile corruption investigations.

The progress of judicial reform in Ukraine faces various issues. Ukrainian academics Oleksandr Bandurka and Vladyslav Teremetskyi have stated the absence of a clear Action Plan as the main obstacle hindering effective implementation. The future of judicial reform is further complicated by the ongoing Russo-Ukrainian war as the judicial sector faces infrastructure damage, resource and funding reallocations, and overall procedural disruptions. In addition, Article 157 of the Ukrainian Constitution prohibits amendments during a state of emergency or martial law, restricting the capabilities for judicial reform on the constitutional level.

== See also ==
- Corruption in Ukraine
