= Valentyna Danishevska =

Ukrainian lawyer and judge

- Валентина Данішевська
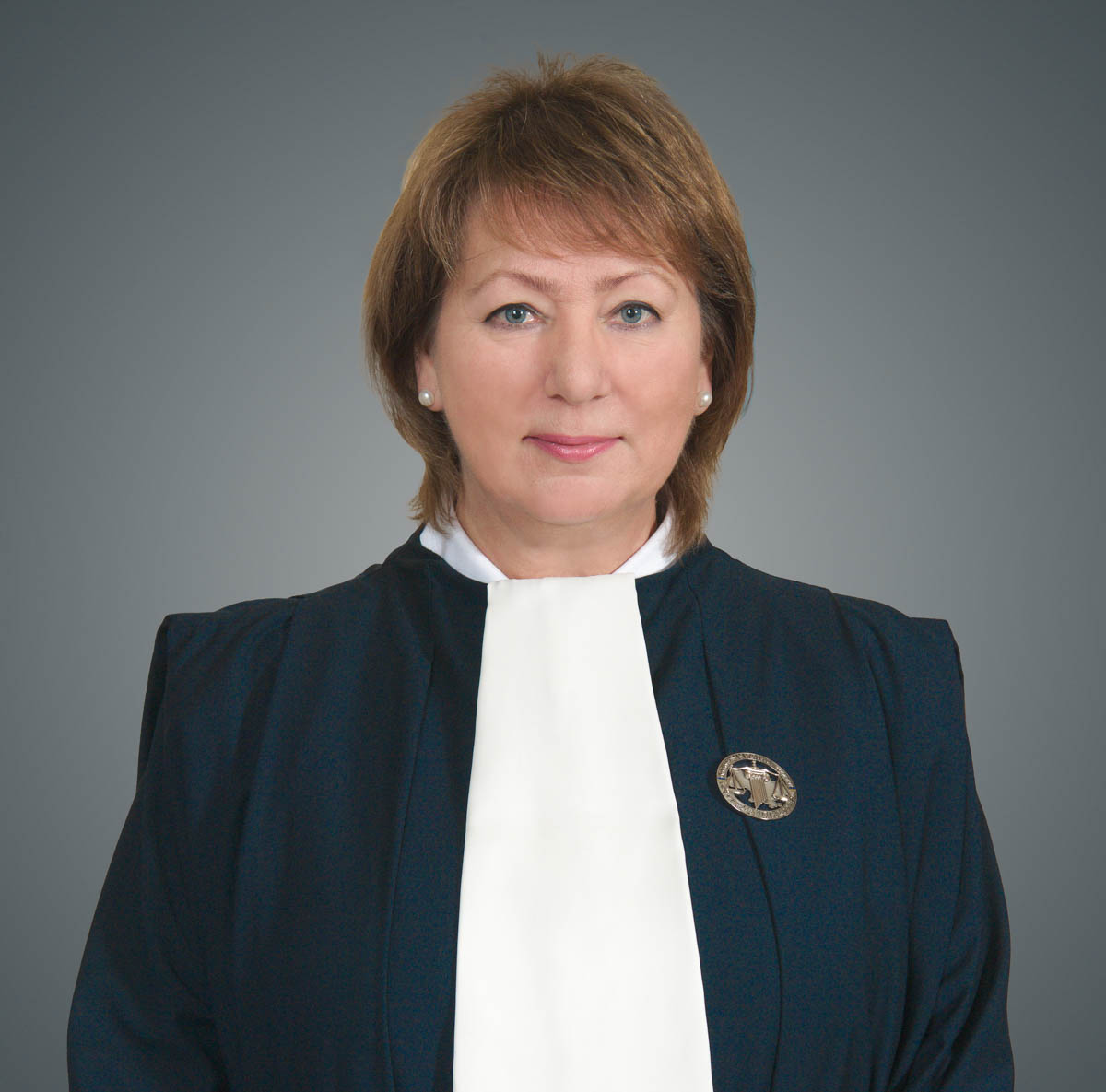

Chairwoman of the Supreme Court of Ukraine
- In office 30 November 2017 – 30 November 2021
- Preceded by: Yaroslav Romanyuk
- Succeeded by: Vsevolod Kniaziev

Personal details
- Born: 23 March 1957 (age 69) Zaporizhzhia, Ukrainian SSR, Soviet Union (now Ukraine)
- Education: Odesa University
- Occupation: Jurist

Valentyna Ivanivna Danishevska (Ukrainian: Валентина Іванівна Данішевська; born 23 March 1957) is a Ukrainian lawyer and judge who served as Chairwoman of the Supreme Court of Ukraine from 2017 to 2021. She is the first woman to hold the position of the Head of the Supreme Court of Ukraine.

== Biography ==
Danishevska is from Zaporizhzhia Oblast. She graduated law faculty of the Odesa University in 1983. Her career started by working for various government enterprises legal departments. By late 1980s she became an arbiter, at first at the commerce department of the Zaporizhzhia Oblast State Administration and since 1992 at the Zaporizhzhia Oblast Arbitration Court.

In 2000s Danishevska worked for Deloitte as a director of the Center of Commerce Law.

In 2016, she was elected a judge of arbitration court of the Supreme Court of Ukraine. In 2017, Danishevska was selected as a chairwoman of the Supreme Court of Ukraine. During the voting she earned 67 votes of 111 participants. Danishevska was elected on the term of four years. On November 30, 2021, she resigned.

Political offices
Preceded by Yaroslav Romanyuk	Chairperson of the Supreme Court of Ukraine; 2017–2021	Succeeded by Vsevolod Kniaziev
