= Stanislav Kravchenko =

Ukrainian Supreme Court judge

- Станіслав Кравченко
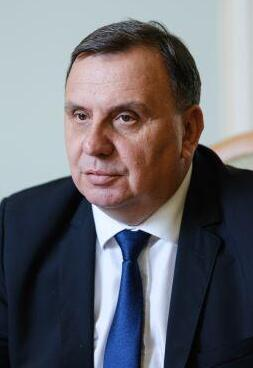

President of the Supreme Court of Ukraine
- Incumbent
- Assumed office 26 May 2023
- Preceded by: Dmytro Luspenyk (Acting)

Personal details
- Born: Stanislav Ivanovych Kravchenko; 5 March 1967 (age 58) Odyntsi, Chernihiv Oblast, Ukrainian SSR, Soviet Union
- Spouse: Inna Oleksiyivna Kravchenko
- Children: a daughter
- Education: Yaroslav Mudryi National Law University

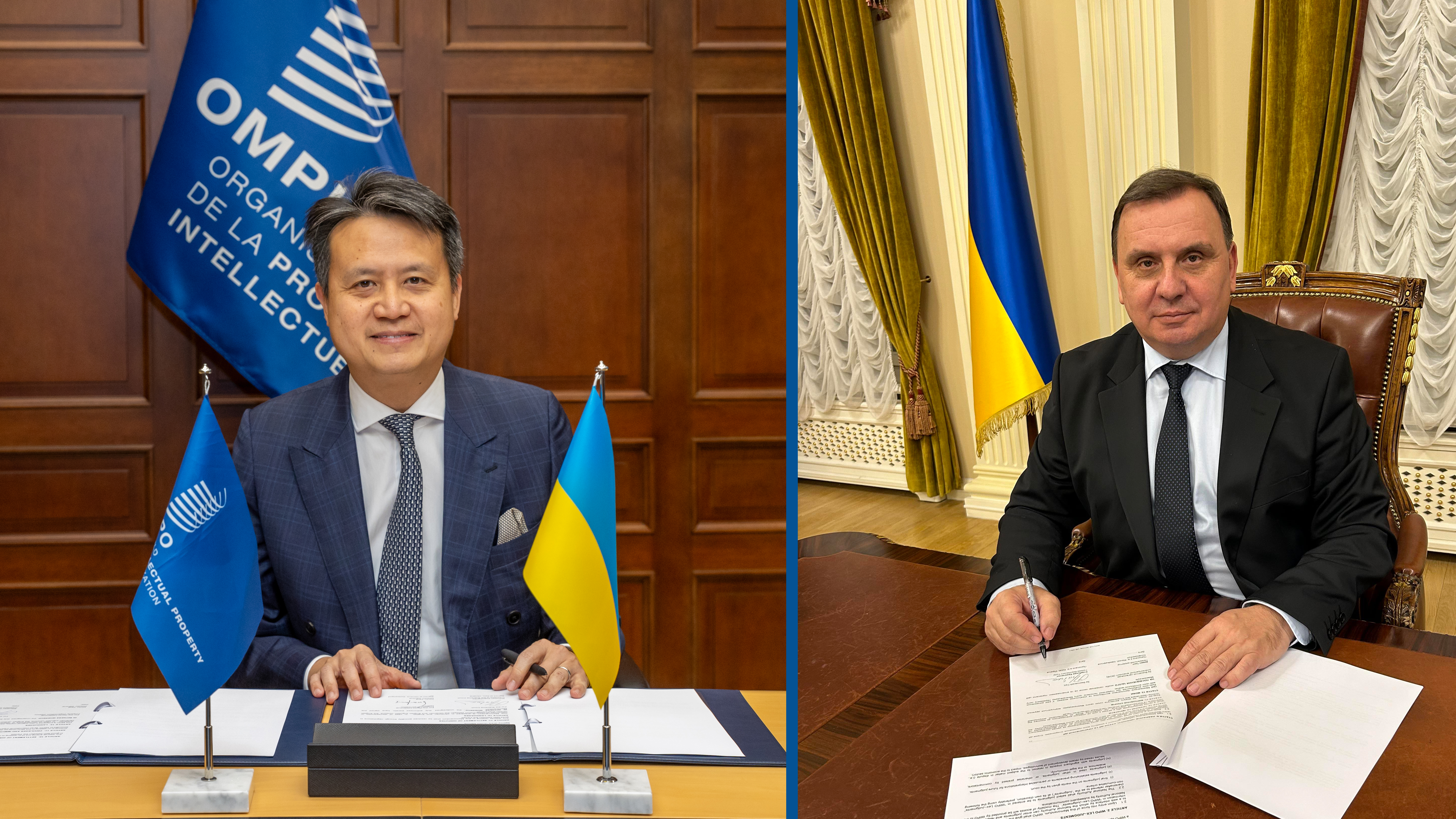
Stanislav Kravchenko (right)

Stanislav Ivanovych Kravchenko (Ukrainian: Станіслав Іванович Кравченко; born on 5 March 1967) is a Ukrainian jurist who is currently serving as the president of the Supreme Court of Ukraine since 25 March 2023.

He is the ex-officio member of the High Council of Justice.

== Biography ==
Stanislav Kravchenko was born on 5 March 1967 in the village of Odyntsi, Kozeletsky district, Chernihiv Oblast.

He started working in 1985.

In 1991, he graduated from the Ukrainian Law Academy named after F. E. Dzerzhynskyi, majoring in "law" (now Yaroslav the Wise National University of Law).

From 1991 to 1992, he was a legal adviser and notary public.

From 1992 to 1993, he was an intern of the people's judge of the Kozeletsky district people's court of the Chernihiv Oblast.

From 1993 to 2002, he was a judge of the Kozeletsky district court of Chernihiv region, and from 2002 to 2011, he was a judge of the Court of Appeals of Kyiv.

On 19 May 2011, he was elected a judge of the Higher Specialized Court of Ukraine for consideration of civil and criminal cases. On 23 April 2014, he was appointed to the position of deputy chairman of that court.

By Presidential Decree dated November 10, 2017, he was appointed a judge of the Criminal Court of Cassation as part of the Supreme Court, and on 8 December he was sworn into court.

He is a Candidate of Legal Sciences as of 2019.

He is a member of the Commission on Legal Reform since 7 August 2019.

On 26 November 2021, Kravchenko was re-elected to the post of chairman of the Criminal Court of Cassation.

On 26 May 2023, the Plenum of the Supreme Court of Ukraine elected Kravchenko as the head of the Supreme Court: 108 out of 148 judges voted for him.

== Critics ==
In 2003, Judges Kravchenko, Serhiy Slynko and Leonid Hlos released Oleksiy Pukach, the murderer of Georgiy Gongadze, from custody, replacing his detention with a restraining order, which allowed him to escape and hide until 2009. The press service of the Ukrainian Academy of Sciences commented that at the time of Pukach's release, they had not yet been charged with the murder of Gongadze.

In 2017, the Public Integrity Council came to the conclusion that Kravchenko, a candidate for the Ukrainian Academy of Sciences, does not meet the criteria of integrity and professional ethics. In the opinion of the State Government, he reported false information regarding participation in decision-making in violation of the Civil Code, and also probably did not declare the land plot.

== Family ==
He is married to Inna Oleksiyivna Kravchenko, who works as a notary, and has a daughter.
