= Anthony Hooper (judge) =

English judge (born 1937)

The Right Honourable Sir Anthony Hooper PC

Lord Justice of Appeal
- In office 24 March 2004 – 16 September 2012

Personal details
- Born: 16 September 1937 (age 89)
- Education: Trinity Hall, Cambridge
- Occupation: Barrister, legal academic, judge
- Known for: Criminal law
- Military career
- Allegiance: United Kingdom
- Branch: British Army
- Rank: Second Lieutenant
- Unit: Royal Tank Regiment

Sir Anthony Hooper (born 16 September 1937) is an English retired judge, former professor of law and a member of Matrix Chambers. He joined Matrix Chambers in 2013 after his retirement from the Court of Appeal of England and Wales. In 2013 he was appointed inaugural Judicial Fellow of the Judicial Institute of University College, London, where he is an Honorary Professor. He is an Honorary Fellow at Trinity hall, Cambridge. Since 2018, he has been helping to fight corruption and to reform judicial system in Ukraine.

A former academic, Hooper wrote the 21st edition of Harris's Criminal Law (1968) and he was General Editor of Blackstone's Criminal Practice (2010–2014), a member and then Deputy Chair of the Criminal Procedure Rule Committee (2005–2012), President of the British Academy of Forensic Sciences (2001–2003) and Chairman of the Expert Witness Institute (2013–2017). Whilst at the Bar, he chaired the Bar Council's Race Relations Committee and was heavily involved in the production and implementation of the first Bar Equality Code.

== Early life and career ==
Hooper was educated at Sherborne School and Trinity Hall, Cambridge. He was called to the Bar in 1965 (Inner Temple), elected a bencher in 2003 and served as Chairman of the Inns of Court School of Law. He was also admitted to the Bar in British Columbia and was a professor at Osgoode Hall Law School in Toronto.

He became a Queen's Counsel in 1987 and served as a Recorder from 1976 until his appointment to High Court on 14 February 1995. He received the customary knighthood and was assigned to the Queen's Bench Division and served as Presiding Judge on the South East Circuit from 1997 to 2000. Hooper delivered a dissenting verdict in a successful High Court appeal made by British soldiers regarding anonymity at the Saville Inquiry.

On 24 March 2004, Hooper became a Lord Justice of Appeal and was appointed to the Privy Council on 4 May of that year. Hooper reached the mandatory retirement age on 16 September 2012.

In 2018, Ukrainian parliament adopted the law to establish the High Anti-Corruption Court focused on dealing with the corruption cases. In November 2018, Hooper was selected to serve as the member of the Public Council of International Experts which would help to select the judges to the new-formed court; later he was elected the chairman of the council.

In November 2021, Hooper was appointed a member of the Ethics Council designed to establish the compliance of the members of the High Council of Justice of Ukraine with the criteria of professional ethics and integrity, and on 1 December of that year, he was elected the deputy chair of the council.

Hooper was chair of a Post Office working group reviewing cases as part of a mediation scheme during the early stage of resolution of the British Post Office scandal. In April 2024 he gave evidence to the subsequent statutory inquiry.

== See also ==
- List of Lords Justices of Appeal
