= ThinkPad T40 =

The IBM ThinkPad T40 is a laptop from the ThinkPad line that was manufactured by IBM. It debuted in 2003
