= Supreme Court of Ukraine =

Highest court in Ukraine

Supreme Court of Ukraine Верховний Суд

- Klov Palace
- Interactive map of Supreme Court of Ukraine; Верховний Суд
- Established: December 15, 1917
- Jurisdiction: Ukraine
- Location: Klov Palace, Kyiv
- Composition method: Presidential-parliamentary appointment
- Authorised by: Constitution of Ukraine
- Appeals to: Constitutional Court (constitutional matters)
- Judge term length: 5-year term, renewable
- Website: court.gov.ua

Head
- Currently: Stanislav Kravchenko
- Since: 25 May 2023

First Vice President

The Supreme Court (Ukrainian: Верховний Суд, romanized: Verkhovnyi Sud) is the highest judicial body in the system of courts of general jurisdiction in Ukraine.

The Court derives its authority from the Constitution of Ukraine, but much of its structure is outlined in legislation. A more detailed description of the Court's functions and authority may be found in the Law of Ukraine "On the Judiciary and the Status of Judges".

== Structure ==
The Court consists of several judicial chambers (on criminal, civil, administrative, and arbitration (commercial) cases and the Grand Chamber of the Supreme Court). In July 2010 functions of the Court was severely limited. But in November 2011 the functions of the Court were broadened and the number of judges became 48.

Appointments to the Court are made after candidates selected in a competition are vetted by the High Council of Justice, which then draws up a final list of candidates for the Supreme Court. After a relevant presidential decree, these candidates become judges of the Supreme Court. Each member of the Court (as with every judge in Ukraine) is obliged to retire at the age of 65.

The Chairman of the Supreme Court is elected to office and dismissed from office by the Plenary Assembly of the Court by secret ballot.

The Supreme Court consists of:

- Grand Chamber of the Supreme Court;
- Administrative Court of Cassation;
- Commercial Court of Cassation;
- Criminal Court of Cassation;
- Civil Court of Cassation.

=== Courts of Cassation within the Supreme Court ===
Each court of cassation consists of judges of the relevant specialization. Also, in each court of cassation, judicial chambers are formed to consider certain categories of cases, taking into account the specialization of judges. The number, personnel and specialization of court chambers are determined by the decision of the meeting of judges of the Court of Cassation. The legislation defines the mandatory establishment of the following separate chambers within the Administrative Court of Cassation and the Commercial Court of Cassation of the Supreme Court:

- In the Administrative Court of Cassation - for consideration of cases concerning:

taxes, fees and other obligatory payments; protection of social rights; electoral process and referendum, as well as protection of political rights of citizens.

- In the Commercial Court of Cassation - to consider cases concerning:

bankruptcy; protection of intellectual property rights, as well as related to antitrust and competition law; corporate disputes, corporate rights and securities.

Other chambers in the courts of cassation are established by the decision of the meeting of judges of the court of cassation.

- Judicial chambers of the Court of Cassation:

administer justice in the manner prescribed by procedural law;

analyze judicial statistics and study judicial practice;

exercise other powers specified by law.

The Judicial Chamber is headed by the Secretary of the Judicial Chamber, and in his absence, the duties of the Secretary are performed by the judge of the Chamber who has the longest experience as a judge of the relevant Court of Cassation.

=== The Grand Chamber of the Supreme Court ===
The Grand Chamber of the Supreme Court is a permanent collegial body of the Supreme Court, which is formed by electing five judges from each court of cassation in the Supreme Court. The President of the Supreme Court is a member of the Grand Chamber ex officio. However, a judge elected to the Grand Chamber and the President of the Supreme Court do not administer justice in the relevant court of cassation. A judge (other than the President of the Supreme Court) shall serve as a judge of the Grand Chamber for three years, but not more than two consecutive terms.

== History ==
The first Supreme Court of Ukraine was established on December 15, 1917 as the General Court of the Ukrainian People's Republic. It was the first national court established since the liquidation of the Hetmanate in the 18th century. Soon after, on January 17, 1918 the Communist government of Ukraine People's Secretariat declared the creation of the People's Court of Ukraine.

The Court consisted of 15 judges elected by the Central Council of Ukraine after being proposed by the General Secretariat of Ukraine. The competence of the elected judges was gradually extended until the adoption of the Constitution of Ukraine by the All-Ukrainian Constituent Assembly. The Office of Prosecutor was established within the General Court and headed by the Senior Prosecutor who was appointed by the Secretary of Court Affairs (Minister of Justice).

The first judges to the court were elected on January 15, 1918 among whom were M. Pukhtynsky, P. Achkasov, O. Butovsky, F. Popov, M. Radchenko, O. Khrutsky, Serhiy Shelukhin, and H. Shyianov. These were later joined by P. Yatsenko, M. Vasylenko, Kostyantyn Tovkach, Arnold D. Margolin, M. Cherniavsky, Bohdan Kistiakivsky and Ihor Kistiakivsky. The Senior Prosecutor appointed was Dmytro Markovych.

On July 8, 1918, the Hetman of Ukraine completely changed the upper echelon of judicial jurisdiction in the country.

The court in Soviet Ukraine was established on March 11, 1923. It moved into the 18th-century Klov Palace in 2003.

According to a 2009 poll, overall trust in the Court in Ukraine is very low.

In the judicial reform introduced in 2016, three courts were abolished and its tasks transferred to special chambers of the Supreme Court of Ukraine:

- The High Specialized Court on Civil and Criminal Cases, covering civil and criminal cases;
- The High Administrative Court of Ukraine, covering administrative cases;
- The High Commercial Court of Ukraine, covering commercial cases.

On 15 May 2023, on the orders of the National Anti-Corruption Bureau of Ukraine and Specialized Anti-Corruption Prosecutor's Office, the Supreme Court chief Vsevolod Kniaziev was detained while allegedly receiving a bribe. On 16 May, a plenary session of the Supreme Court expressed no confidence in Kniaziev, resulting in his dismissal from his position as chairman.

== Heads ==
=== Soviet period ===
Name	Term of office	Notes
Serhiy Buzdalin	1923–1924	
Mykhailo Lebedynets	1924–	
Mykhailo Mykhailyk	1925–1926	
Frants Mazur	1926–1928	
Semen Krupko	1928–1929	
Herman Zavitskyi	1929–1934	
Hryhoriy Zhelieznohorskyi	1934–1936	
Fedir Shumyatskyi	1936–1938	
Kostiantyn Topchiy	1938–1948	
Petro Noshchenko	1948–1957	
Fedir Hlukh	1957–1963	
Volodymyr Zaichuk	1963–1970	
Oleksandr Yakymenko	1970–1991	

=== Independent period ===
Name	Term of office	Length of term
Oleksandr Yakymenko	1991–1993	2 years, 53 days
Heorhiy Butenko	1993–1994	342 days
Vitaliy Boiko	1994–2002	7 years, 307 days
Vasyl Malyarenko	2002–2006	3 years, 252 days
Vasyl Onopenko	2006–2011	4 years, 362 days
Petro Pylypchuk	2011–2013	1 year, 116 days
Yaroslav Romanyuk	2013–2017	4 years, 177 days
Valentyna Danishevska	2017–2021	4 years, 0 days
Vsevolod Kniaziev	2021–2023	1 year, 166 days
Dmytro Luspenyk (acting)	2023	9 days
Stanislav Kravchenko	2023–present	2 years, 222 days
