= Public Integrity Council =

Ukrainian advisory council created in 2016

- Established: 2016 (10 years ago)
- Types: organization
- Country: Ukraine

The Public Integrity Council is a Ukrainian advisory council created in 2016 for helping the High Qualifications Commission of Judges (HQCJ) of Ukraine to decide on the ethical eligibility of judges. In late 2023, a law giving the HQCJ the right to suspend members of the Public Integrity Council was launched in Verkhovna Rada, the Ukrainian parliament.

== Creation ==
The Public Integrity Council was established under Article 87 of the Ukrainian law No 31 of 2016 "on the Judiciary and the Status of Judges".

== Aim and rules ==
Article 87 of law No 31 of 2016 on the Judiciary and the Status of Judges defines the role of the Council in 20 paragraphs, with the primary aim being to help the High Qualifications Commission of Judges (HQCJ) of Ukraine in deciding on the ethical eligibility of judges. The HQCJ can override the council's recommendation to reject a judge if at least eleven of the HQCJ's sixteen members agree for the override.

In 2017, Diana Kovacheva, in her role as an international expert of the Council of Europe, found that the Public Integrity Council's procedural rules were generally consistent with European judicial independence standards, while making recommendations for specific changes to further improve compliance with judicial standards.

== Membership ==
The council is defined to have twenty members appointed by non-governmental organisations (NGOs) whose aim is "fighting corruption, protecting human rights [or] supporting institutional reforms". The appointments are for a term of two years, with no limit to re-appointment.

Members of the 2018–2020 session were elected by twelve NGOs, including Center for Civil Liberties and Dejure Foundation.

== 2023 draft law ==
On 21 November 2023, a draft law was passed on its first reading by Verkhovna Rada, the Ukrainian parliament, giving the HQCJ the right to suspend members of the council and forbidding the council from publishing its assessment of judges. Dejure Foundation saw the draft law as giving HQCJ control over the council.
