= Belarus (tractor) =

Series of tractors

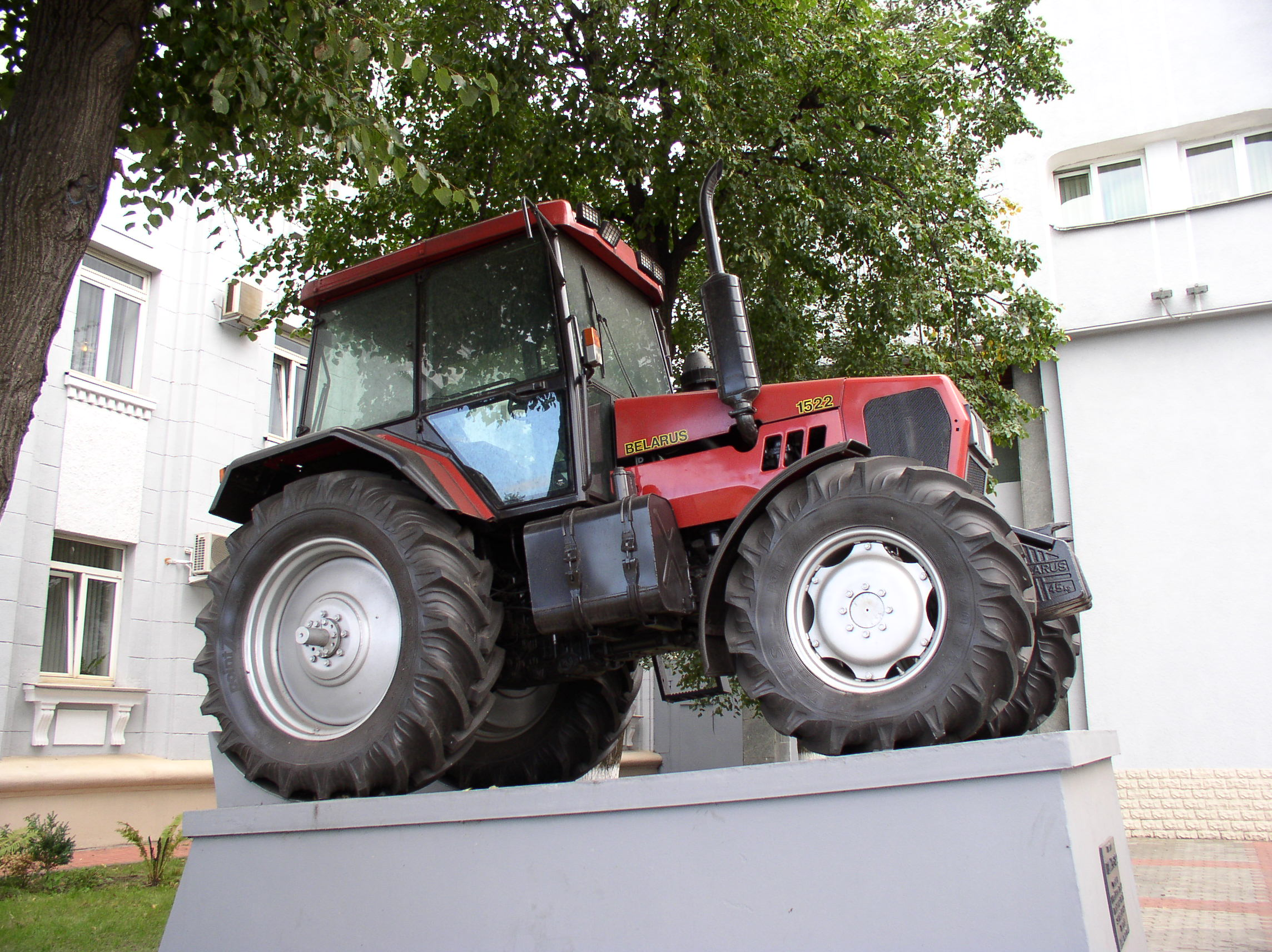
Belarus-1522

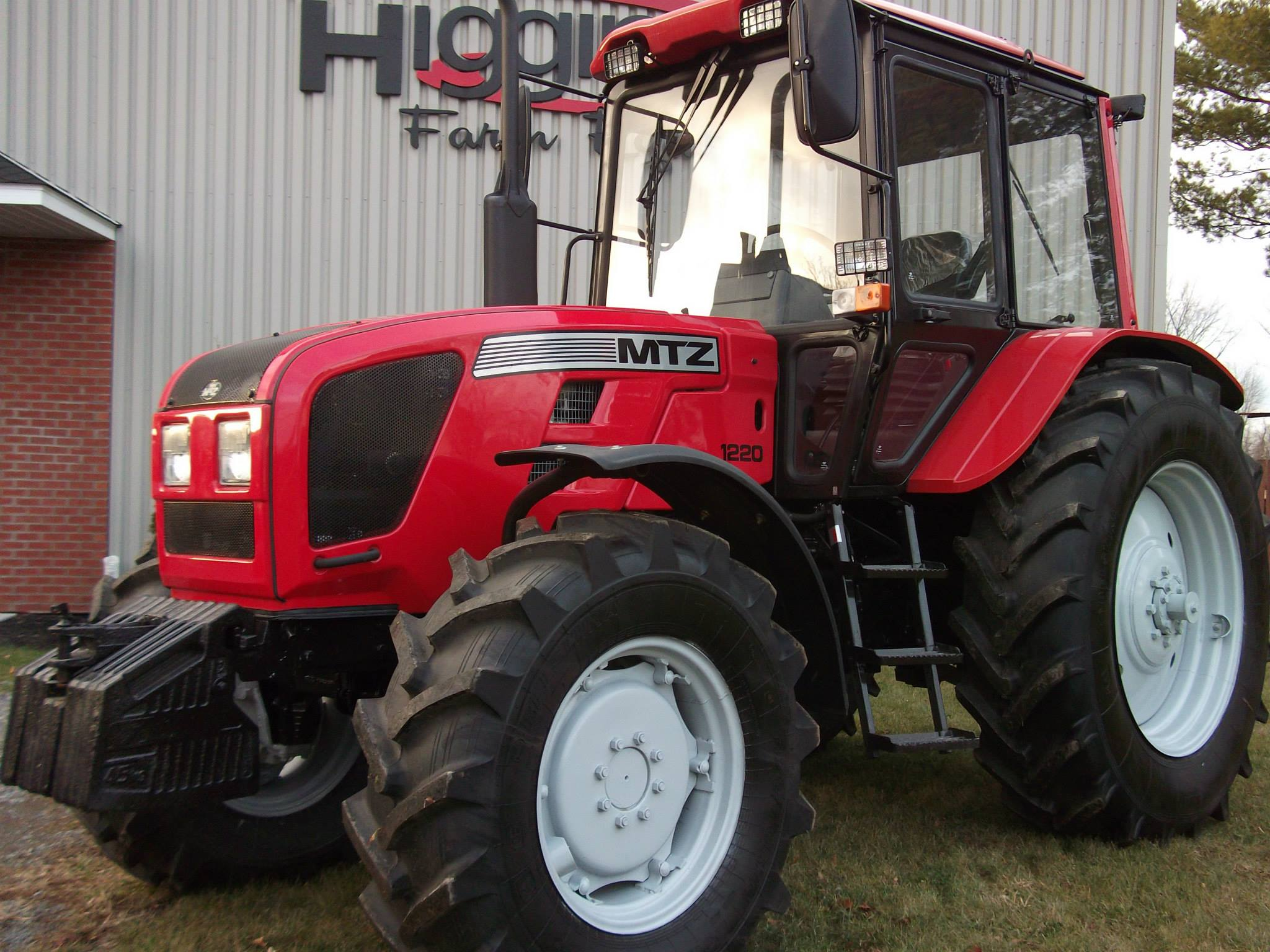
Tractor "Belarus 1220.4" from Minsk Tractor Works

Belarus («Белару́с», earlier «Белару́сь») is a series of four-wheeled tractors produced since 1950 at Minsk Tractor Works, MTZ (Belarusian: Мінскі трактарны завод; Russian: Ми́нский тра́кторный заво́д, МТЗ) in Minsk, Belarus. These tractors are very well known throughout the Commonwealth of Independent States and are exported to more than 100 countries worldwide, including the United States and Canada.

== History ==
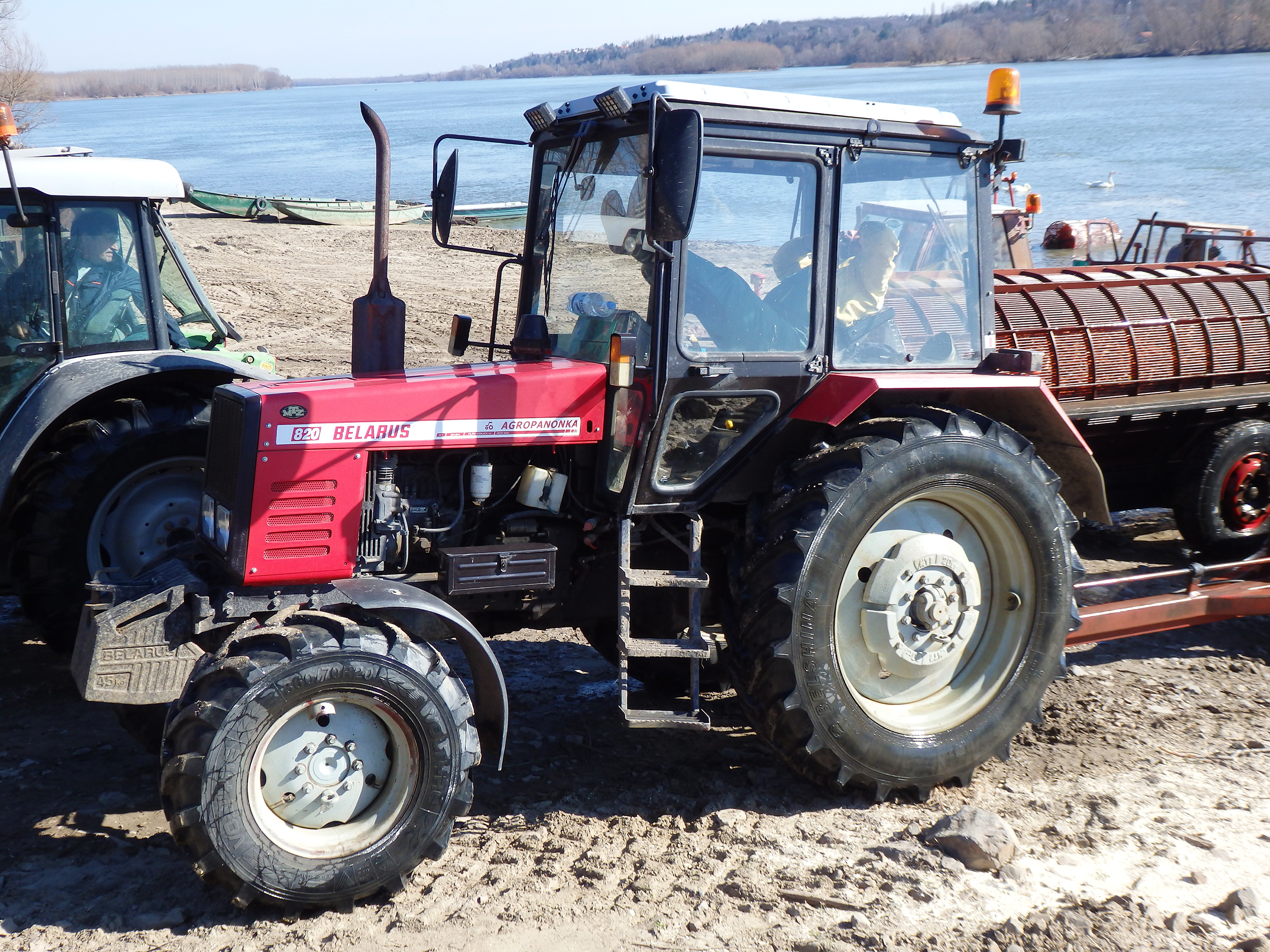
Belarus MTZ-820 in Begeč, Serbia

Up to the 1950s MTZ had not produced wheeled tractors, tracked crawler tractors being more common. These early tractors were essentially re-claimed tanks, with the gun turret removed and a flatbed, winch, crane or dozer blade added; the tractors saw more use in land reclamation and forestry applications rather than agriculture. This was largely due to the tanks being unsuitable for large-scale cultivation, as their engine, transmission and track reliability were poor due to not being designed for pulling loads for long periods, as required in agriculture. New designs were put into production during 1950, and the new MTZ wheeled tractor was born. These tractors were built to the three main concepts of Soviet engineering: reliability, simplicity and value for money.

Belarus MTZ-82-L logging in Estonia (November 2021)

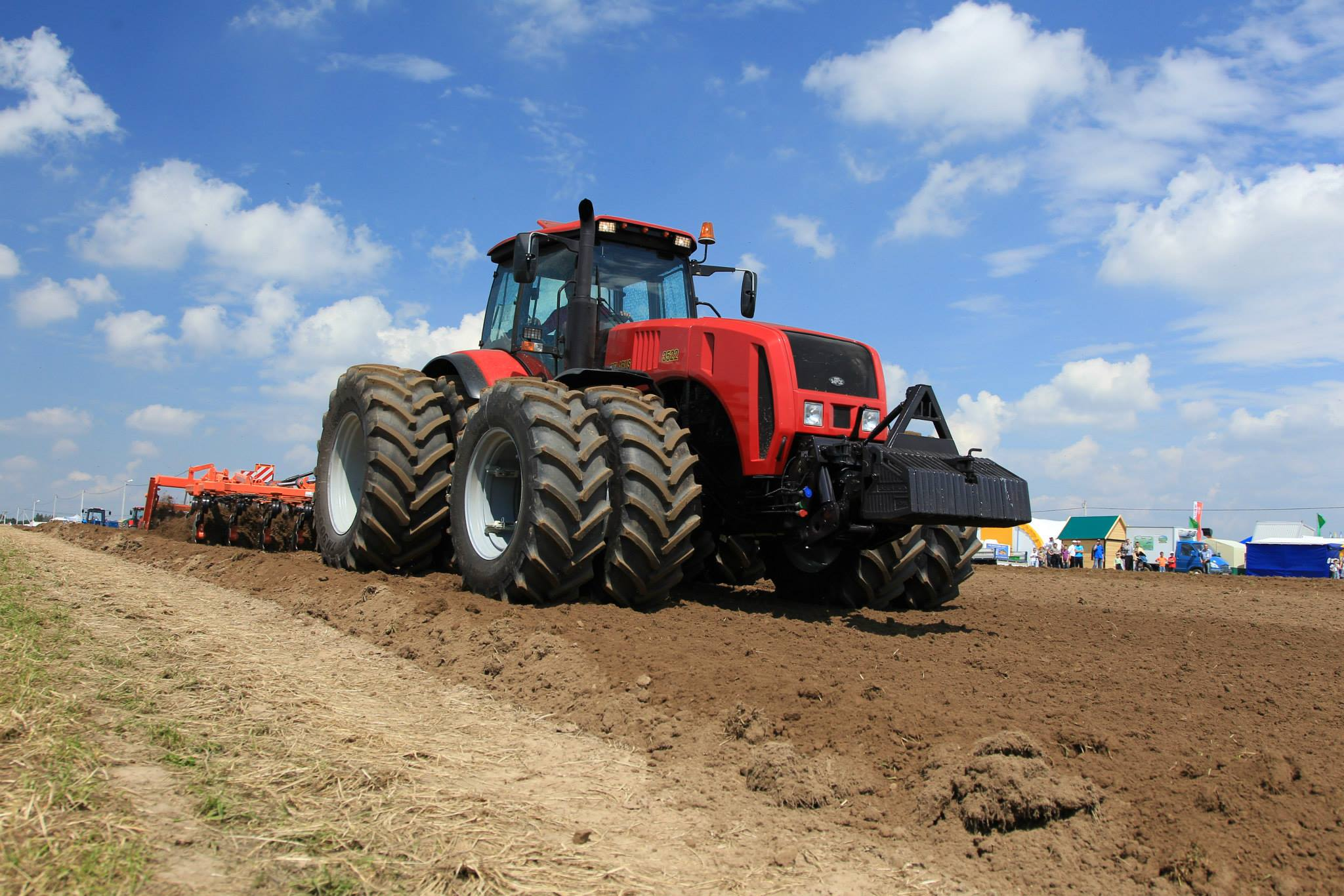
Tractor "Belarus 3522" from Minsk Tractor Works

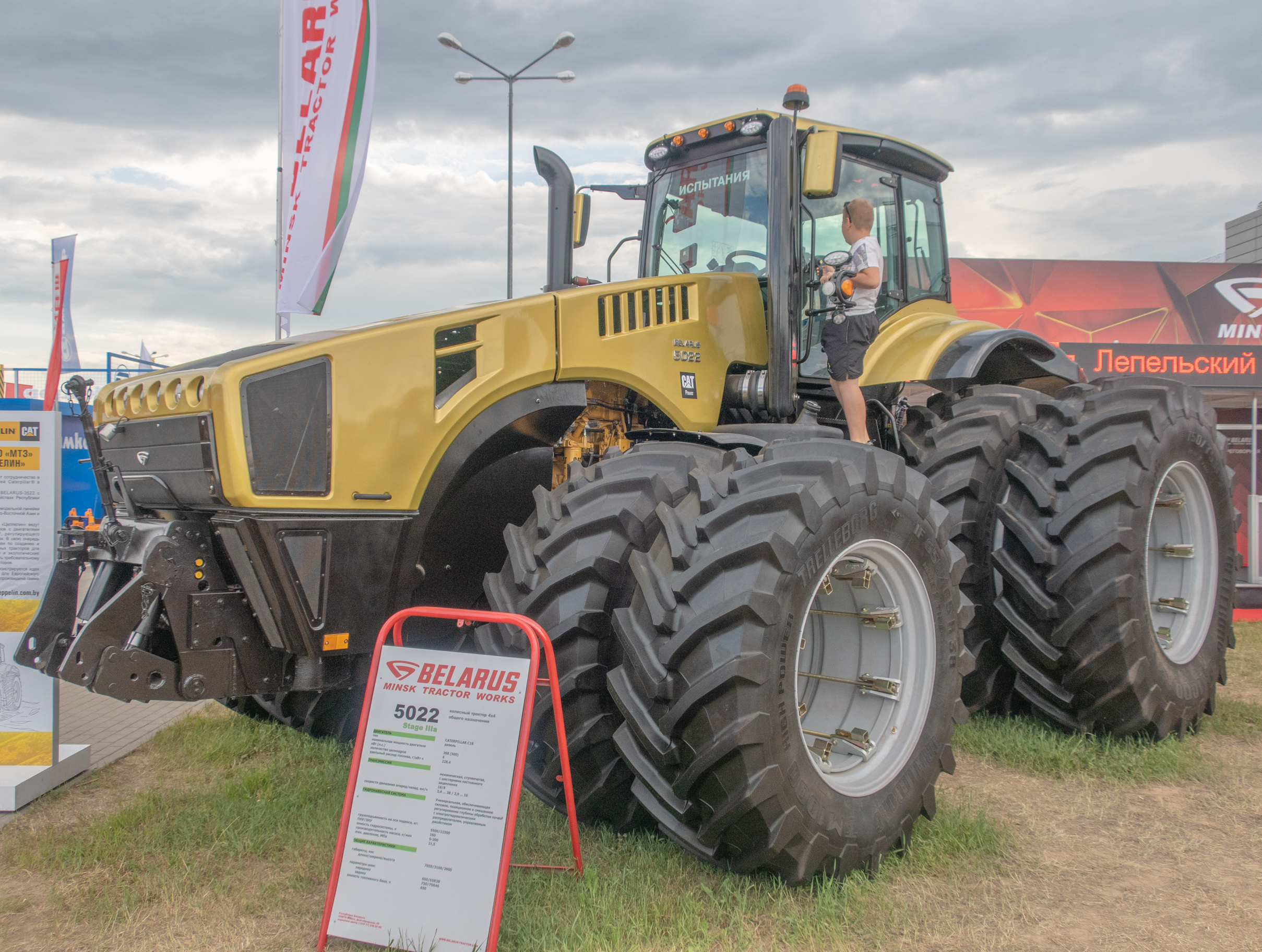
Tractor "Belarus 5022" from Minsk Tractor Works with Caterpillar C18 (500 hp) engine

Some 3 million tractors have been built in the Minsk Tractor Works since 1948. In 2010, distribution of Belarus tractors in United States and Canada was re-established through a local distributor "MTZ Equipment Ltd". One of the contributing factors was that the factory started making tractors with compression ignition diesel engines matching the current emissions standards, including Tier 3/4i/4 (United States/Canada) and Euro 3a, 3b, 4 for emission standards in Europe.

In February 2014, the MTZ brand made its first appearance at the National Farm Machinery Show in Louisville, Kentucky, with the MTZ 1220 tractor model.

A Belarus model 1523.3 tractor was gifted to Vladimir Putin on his 70th birthday by President of Belarus Aleksander Lukashenko.

== Licensing ==
=== Azerbaijan ===
In December 2004 Ganja Auto Plant restarted manufacturing and the first car built at the factory was sold. In 2008, the plant produced about 600 cars and tractors.

=== Pakistan ===
Fecto Group first introduced Soviet Brand Tractors in West Pakistan back in 1962. Initially tractors were imported from USSR. Later Fecto Belarus Tractor Assembly Plant was built in Lahore in 1980's. Since then different Tractor Models were introduced ranging from 25 H.P to 80 H.P. These include: MTZ -50 (55 H.P) C.B.U MTZ -50 (55 H.P) local locally assembled T -25 A (25 H.P)s. UMZ -60 (60 H.P/li> Belarus-510 ( 57 H.P) Belarus-520 (62 H.P) Belarus -511 (57 H.P) Belarus-800(80 H.P)

=== Romania ===
In October 2010 the Romanian company IRUM in Reghin, specializing in articulated lumber tractors, started assembling from imported KD Belarus TAG tractors for the local market.

=== Serbia ===
In 2011 the Serbian company Agropanonka started assembling 3,000 tractors per year for its local market.

=== Tajikistan ===
In September 2012, Tajikistan and Belarus reached agreement to set up a company producing Belarus tractors in the south of Tajikistan. The new facility will produce 250 tractors per year. By 2017 the company’s capacity will be increased up to 1,500. There are plans to export some of tractors produced in Tajikistan to other countries of the region.

=== Cambodia ===
In March 2013, a Belarus Tractor Assembly Plant opened near Phnom Penh in Cambodia. The joint project involves the annual supplying of more than 400 different models of tractors to the markets of Cambodia and surrounding countries.
