= T-40 (tractor) =

Soviet tractor

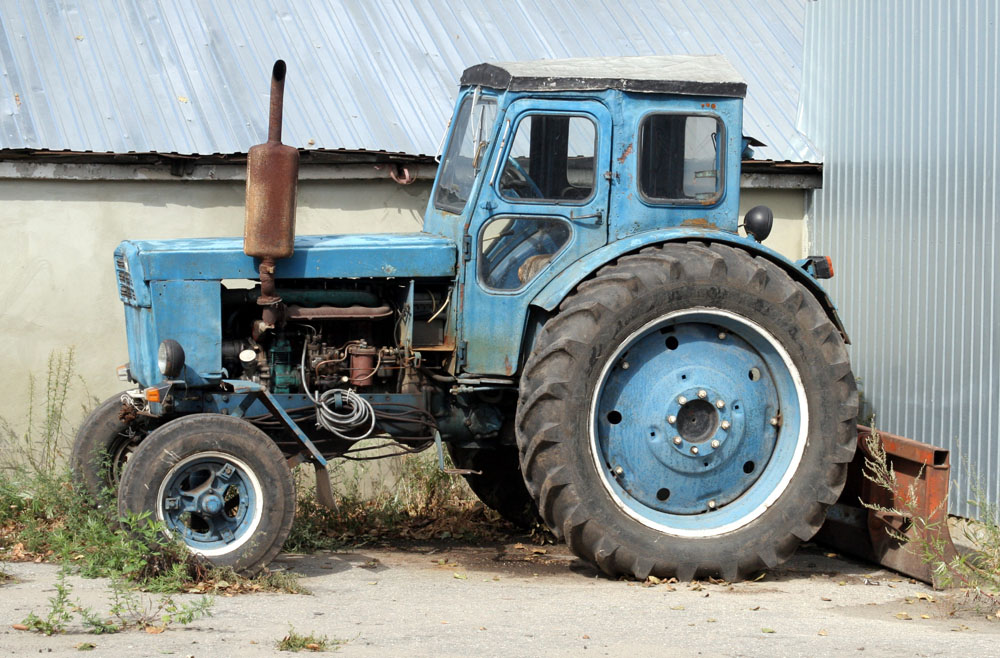
- Weight: 2,595 kg (5,721 lb)

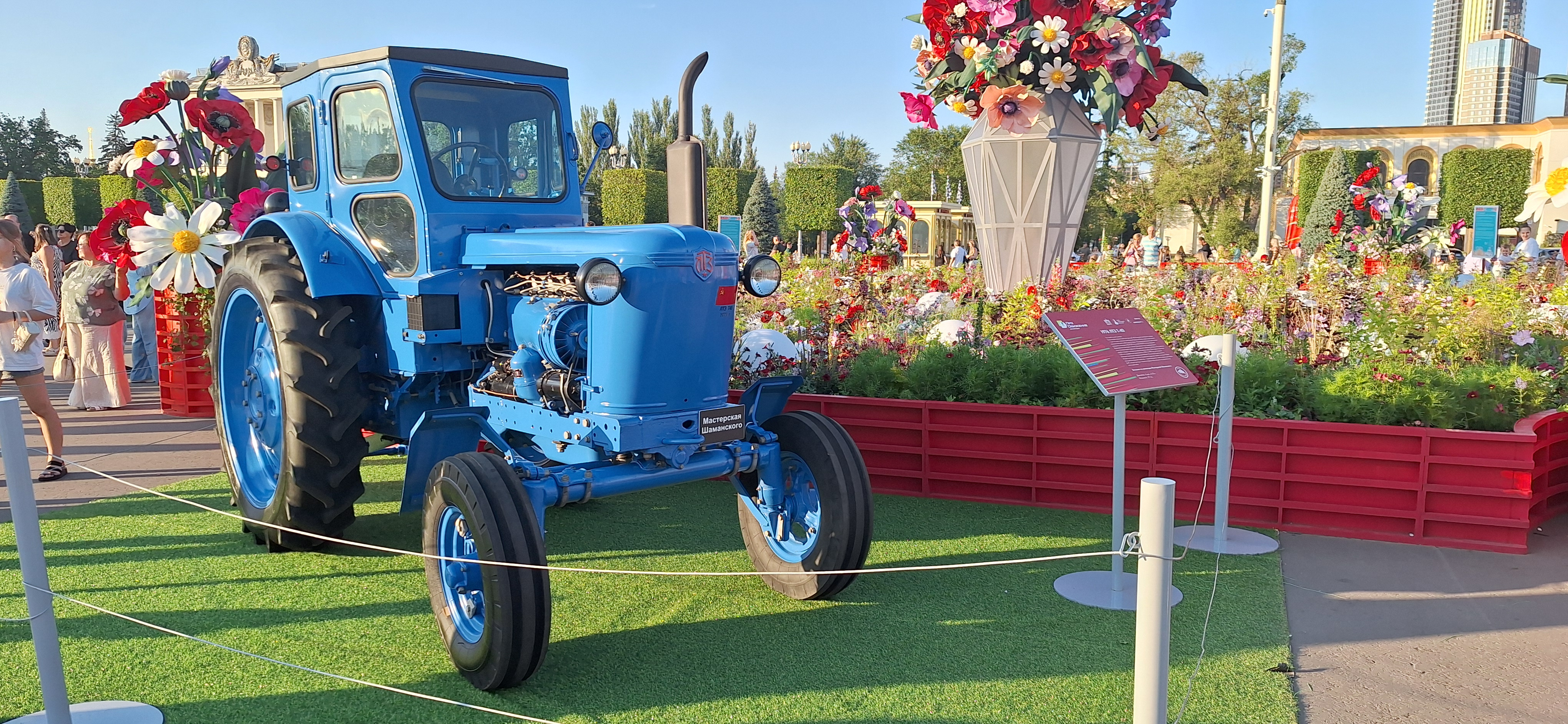
T-40 during "ProDvizhanie 2025" festival.

From 1961 until 1995 the T-40 was a farm tractor built by the Lipetsk Tractor Plant.

The T-40 was designed for plowing light soil, processing row crops, mowing, plowing snow and for transportation. To achieve these goals, it has a carrier transmission and rear axle, a more rigid connection between the engine and the transmission case, increased diameter of the rear drive wheels, smaller front guide wheels and stiffer suspension than other tractors.

Its durability has enabled many of the tractors produced in the 70's - 80's to remain in operation. Spare parts are still being produced.

== Features ==
The T-40 was produced by the Lipetsk Tractor Plant. The tractor has four-cylinder four-stroke diesel air-cooled engine: D-37 37 hp or D-144 50 hp. Depending on configuration, an electric starter or a gasoline starting engine (PD8), were used to start the diesel engine.

It was manufactured in four-wheel drive (T-40A) and rear-wheel drive versions. It has an adjustable gauge and adjustable ride height on all wheels. The T-40 can be fitted with removable rear wheels of reduced width to work in aisles. In order to work on steep slopes, the track width can be increased by installing the rear wheels inside out.

The T-40 had a completely reversible manual transmission, allowing the use of the full range of speeds both forward and backward. A bevel gear was placed immediately after the clutch and a mechanical or hydrostatic reduction gear, which enabled it to operate at low (less than 2 km/h) speeds. It had two PTO shafts - rear and side. These features, as well as its good performance, led to the tractor being widely adopted throughout the USSR.

The engine is air-cooled which reduces the risk of overheating and freezing.

== Modifications ==
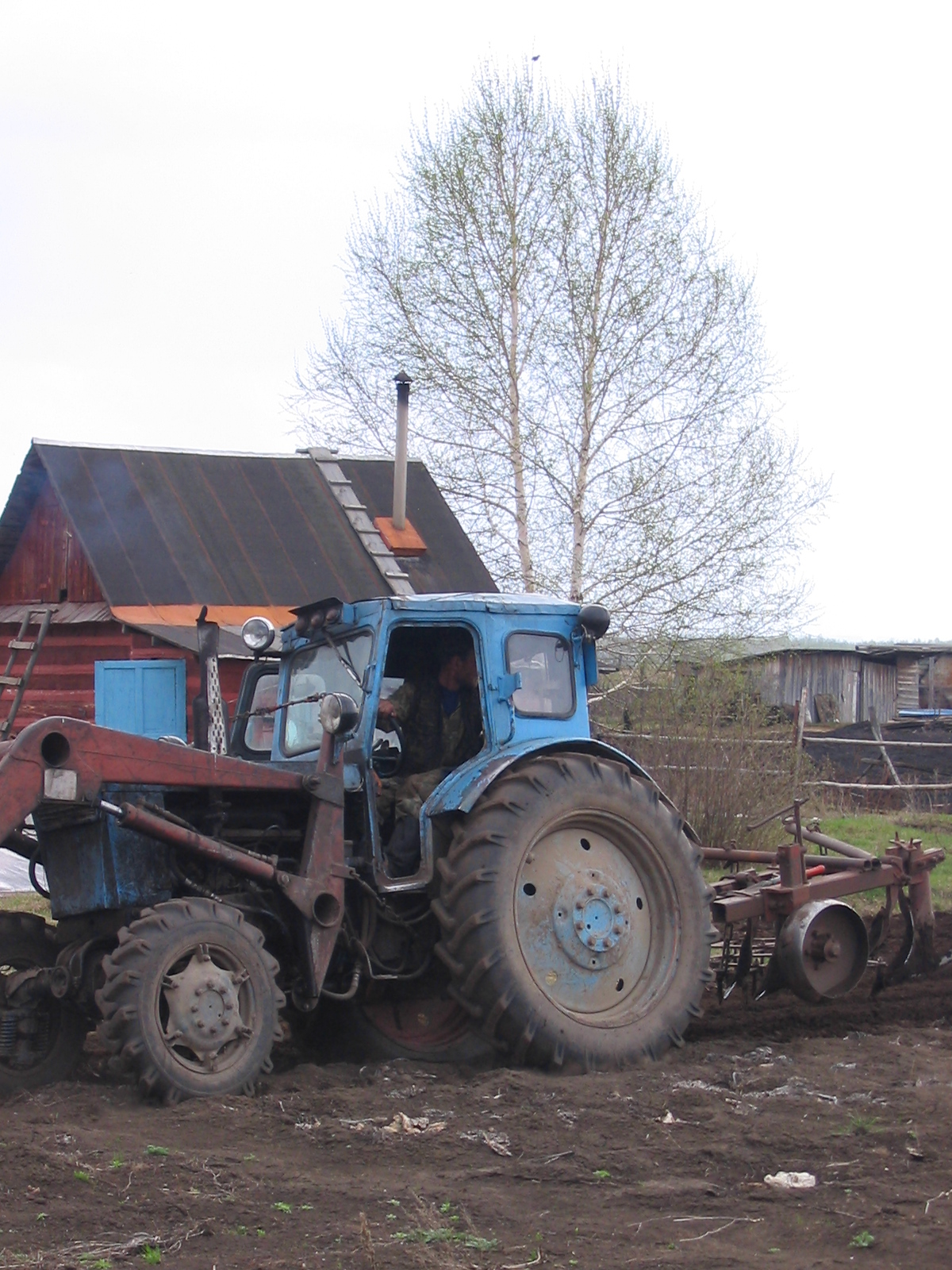
Tractor T-40AM with a mounted plow and front-end loader

Tractors with D-37 and D-144 (some sources D-37e) engines had differently shaped hoods. The former had a rounded hood, while the latter had a rectangular hood.

=== Modifications with D-37 engines ===
- T-40 - basic model - rear-wheel drive, engine D-37
- T-40A - all-wheel drive
- T-40AN - all-wheel drive with reduced height and less ground clearance for slopes
- T-50A - Industrial modification for shovel loading

=== Modifications with D-144 (50 hp) engines ===
- T-40M - rear-wheel drive
- T-40AM - all-wheel drive
- T-40ANM - all-wheel drive and reduced ground clearance for slopes
- T-40AP - all-wheel drive designed for communal facilities

== See also ==
- Photos tractor T-40, T-40A
- Photos of tractors T-40M and its modifications
