= High Council of Justice (Ukraine) =

National council of the judiciary of Ukraine

- Вища рада правосуддя Vyshcha rada pravosuddia

Agency overview
- Formed: 31 March 1998; 28 years ago
- Jurisdiction: Ukraine
- Headquarters: 12-a, Studentska str, Kyiv
- Agency executive: Hryhorii Usyk, Chairman
- Website: hcj.gov.ua

The High Council of Justice, or sometimes the Supreme Council of Justice (Ukrainian: Вища рада правосуддя) is the national council of the judiciary of Ukraine, which submits motions to appoint, dismisses and disciplines judges. In 2021, the Ethics Council was created with the intention of selecting the members of the High Council of Justice in a way that would help to create an independent and efficient judiciary in Ukraine.

== Functions ==
The High Council of Justice has powers to:

- submit motions to the President to appoint judges,
- dismiss, suspend or discipline judges,
- give consent to arrest or detain judges,
- transfer or reassign judges to a different court,
- appoint and remove members of the High Qualification Commission of Judges of Ukraine,
- and execute other powers defined by the Laws of Ukraine "On the High Council of Justice" and "On the Judiciary and the Status of Judges".

== Composition ==
There are total of 21 members. The term of membership in the council is four years. It is forbidden to be a member of the council for two tenures in a row.

The appointees include:

- ex officio the Chairman of the Supreme Court of Ukraine
- 10 appointees of the Congress of Judges of Ukraine
- 2 appointees of the Verkhovna Rada
- 2 appointees of the President of Ukraine
- 2 appointees of the Congress of Advocates of Ukraine
- 2 appointees of the Congress of representative from law schools and scientific institutions
- 2 appointees of the All-Ukrainian Conference of Employees of Prosecutors (Procurocy, before 2020).

Membership requirements are:

- citizenship of Ukraine
- older than 35 years
- higher judicial education
- practicing of law no less than 15 years
- she or he must be politically neutral

Ineligible for membership are:

- elected government officials
- members of political parties
- individuals who work for political parties or for other organizations with political goals or that takes part in political activities
- individuals who take part in the organization or funding of political campaigns and other (political) activities

== Publications ==
Official materials of the council is published in the Bulletin of the Supreme Court of Ukraine and in special cases in "Holos Ukrainy" and "Uryadovyi kurier".

== History ==
The High Council of Justice (Ukrainian: Вища рада юстиції) was firstly introduced into Ukraine's legal system with the adoption of the 1996 Constitution.

On January 15, 1998, the Ukrainian Parliament (Verkhovna Rada) adopted the law "On the High Council of Justice" (Ukrainian: "Про Вищу раду юстиції"). After that the majority of the initial Council members were appointed by the respective bodies.

The first official session of the council was held on March 31, 1998, and Valeri Yevdokimov was elected its first chairman.

In January 2017, the new law "On the High Council of Justice" (Ukrainian: "Про Вищу раду правосуддя") entered into force which re-established the council with the new Ukrainian name ("Вища рада правосуддя"), the new functions and change to its composition. In particular, the Council assumed from the Verkhovna Rada the functions to appoint judges and give consent to detain or arrest judges. The council also became responsible for disciplining and dismissing judges.

In 2021, the Ethics Council was legally defined by law No. 1635-IX, "On amendments to certain legislative acts of Ukraine concerning the procedure for selection (appointment) to the positions of members of the High Council of Justice and the activities of disciplinary inspectors of the High Council of Justice". In November 2021, the composition of the Ethics Council was set, with three Ukrainian members, Supreme Court judge Lev Kyshakevych, Kyiv Court of Appeal judge Yuriy Tryasun, and retired judge Volodymyr Siverin; and three international members, British retired judge Anthony Hooper, United States retired judge Robert J. Cordy and former Estonian prosecutor-general Lavly Perling. In June 2022, the Council started confirming, appointing and refusing members of the High Council of Justice. Anti-corruption organisations including AutoMaidan objected to the council's decisions.

On 1 June 2023 the High Council of Justice appointed all members of the new High Qualification Commission of Judges (HQCJ), which has been dysfunctional since the termination of the previous composition on October 19, 2019.

== List of chairmen of the Council ==
- March 31, 1998 - May 25, 2001—Valeri Yevdokimov, end of term
- May 25, 2001 - March 10, 2004—Serhii Kivalov, becoming Head of the Central Election Commission of Ukraine
- March 10, 2004 - January 20, 2006—Mykola Shelest, becoming judge of the Supreme Court of Ukraine
- January 20, 2006 - March 28, 2007—(acting) Lidiya Izovitova
- March 28, 2007 - March 22, 2010—Lidiya Izovitova, end of term
- March 22, 2010 - May 16, 2013 —Volodymyr Kolesnychenko
- July 4, 2013 - April 10, 2014 — Oleksandr Lavrynovych
- June 9, 2015 - April 16, 2019—Ihor Benedysiuk
- April 16, 2019 - September 24, 2019—Volodymyr Hovorukha
- September 24, 2019 - March 11, 2021—Andriy Ovsienko
- March 2021 - January 2022 — (acting) Oleksii Malovatskyi
- January 24, 2022 - May 8, 2022 — (acting) Viktor Hryschuk
- May 2022 - January 2023 — (acting) Vitalii Salikhov
- January 23, 2023 - present—Hryhorii Usyk

== See also ==
- Judiciary of Ukraine
