= Judiciary of Ukraine =

Overview of Ukraine's court system

The judicial system of Ukraine is outlined in the 1996 Constitution of Ukraine. Before this, there was no notion of judicial review nor any Supreme court since 1991's Ukrainian independence when it started being slowly restructured.

Although judicial independence exists in principle, there is little separation of juridical and political powers in practice. Judges are subjected to pressure from political and business interests. Ukraine's court system is widely regarded as corrupt.

Although there are still problems with the performance of the system, it is considered to have been much improved since the last judicial reform introduced in 2016.

== Courts ==
Ukrainian courts enjoy legal, financial and constitutional freedom guaranteed by measures adopted in Ukrainian law in 2010.

The judicial system of Ukraine consists of three levels of courts of general jurisdiction.

Prior to the judicial reform introduced in 2016 the system consists of four levels. The Cassation Court of Ukraine existed until 2003. Those courts were recognized as unconstitutional by the Constitutional Court of Ukraine.

=== Local courts ===
Ukraine has 74 district courts. In 2018 they replaced the 142 local general courts. For example, in Kyiv ten district courts were eliminated and six district courts created.

=== Courts of appeal ===
- Courts of Appeal (combining criminal and civil jurisdiction), consisting of:
  - regional courts of appeal;
  - courts of appeal of the cities of Kyiv.

Prior to the judicial reform introduced in 2016, there were parallel Specialized Courts of Appeal (either commercial or administrative jurisdiction) consisting of the commercial courts of appeal and the administrative courts of appeal.

=== The Constitutional Court of Ukraine ===
- The Constitutional Court of Ukraine is a special body with authority to assess whether legislative acts of the Parliament, President, Cabinet or Crimean Parliament are in line with the Constitution of Ukraine. This court also gives commentaries to certain norms of the constitution or laws of Ukraine (superior acts of Parliament).

=== The High Anti-Corruption Court ===
- The High Anti-Corruption Court of Ukraine is to be established before the end of 2018. Cases concerning corruption in Ukraine will be bought directly to this court. Appeals will be considered by a completely separate Appeal Chamber of the High Anti-Corruption Court. The law on the High Anti-Corruption Court of Ukraine came into force on 14 June 2018.

=== Abolished high courts with specialized jurisdiction ===
In the judicial reform introduced in 2016 the following three courts were abolished and its tasks transferred to special chambers of the Supreme Court of Ukraine.

- The High Specialized Court on Civil and Criminal Cases, covering civil and criminal cases;
- The High Administrative Court of Ukraine, covering administrative cases;
- The High Commercial Court of Ukraine, covering commercial cases.

The rulings of the High (sometimes translated as Supreme) Administrative Court of Ukraine could not be appealed.

== Officers ==
=== Judges ===
In 2012 Ukraine had about 8,000 judges.

Since the juridical reform of 2016 judges are appointed by the President of Ukraine upon their nomination by the Supreme Council of Justice. Prior judges were appointed by presidential decree for a period of five years, after which the Ukrainian parliament confirmed them for life in an attempt to insulate them from politics. This five year probation period was also abolished in 2016. Judges are protected from dismissal (save in instances of gross misconduct). Immunity from prosecution was guaranteed to judges until 2016. (This immunity could be lifted by parliament.) Currently a judge is protected from liability resulting from their judicial actions only.

After judicial reforms, there was, effectively, a hiring freeze, which increased case backlog and caused a dearth of 2,600 judges, about a third of the judiciary, as they retired or were dismissed. In the later half of 2023, due to requirements of accession to the European Union, Ukraine re-opened two judicial governance bodies and sought to hire 1,100 judges over a period of months, and 2,000 judges over a period of years.

=== Lay assessors ===
Ukraine has a jury system; although almost all cases are heard by either a single judge or two judges accompanied by assessors. In fact so few people in Ukraine face a jury trial that in 2018 survey by the Center for Civil Liberties, 64% of respondents claimed that such a phenomenon does not exist in Ukraine. Ukrainian law allows jurors to hear only those criminal cases where the sentence can reach life imprisonment. But even then they are not mandatory. A jury is only appointed if the accused so wishes. Jurors are not formed from random citizens, but rather from those who have previously applied for this role. Citizens are prohibited from joining a jury if:

- they do not speak Ukrainian
- elderly people over the age of 65
- persons with chronic mental or other illnesses that interfere with the work of the jury
- persons with an outstanding criminal record
- persons people's deputies, members of the Cabinet of Ministers, judges, law enforcement and judicial officials, the military, other officials, lawyers, notaries
- persons who have received an administrative penalty for corruption in the previous year
- persons who are recognized as having limited legal capacity or incapable

A Ukrainian jury is made up of five jurors (three main and two reserve) and two professional judges who are actively involved in decision-making.

Jurors are prohibited from communicating with anyone other than the court about the merits of the case without the permission of the presiding judge. They may not divulge details known to them or gather information about the case outside of the court proceedings. Jurors are financially compensated.

== Administration ==
The Congress of Judges (З'їзд суддів України) is the highest body of judicial self-government.

The Council of Judges is responsible for the enforcement of the decisions of the Congress and their implementation in the period between congresses, and decides on the convocation of the Congress.

The State Judicial Administration provides organizational support of the judiciary and represents the judiciary to the Cabinet of Ministers and the Verkhovna Rada.

The High Judicial Qualifications Commission of Ukraine conducts the selection of judicial candidates, submits to the High Council of Justice recommendations on the appointment of a candidate for the subsequent introduction of the submission of the President of Ukraine, makes recommendations on the election of a permanent post, and conducts disciplinary proceedings including dismissal.

The High Council of Justice "is a collective independent body that is responsible for formation of the high-profile judge corpus capable of qualified, honest and impartial exercise of justice on a professional basis; and for making decisions regarding violations by judges and procurators of the requirements concerning their incompatibility and within the scope of their competence of their disciplinary responsibility". Three members of the council are automatically assigned for holding the following positions: Chairman of the Supreme Court, Minister of Justice, and Prosecutor General. The other 17 members are elected for a period of six years. The council consists of 20 members. It was created on January 15, 1998.

== Law ==
The 2010 Judicial System and Status of Judges Act is the legal basis for the organization of the judiciary and the administration of justice in Ukraine.

=== Procedure ===
Since January 1, 2010 it is allowed to hold court proceedings in Russian on mutual consent of parties. Citizens, who are unable to speak Ukrainian or Russian are allowed to use their native language or the services of a translator.

== Analysis and criticism ==
=== Corruption ===
A Ukrainian Ministry of Justice survey of Ukrainians in 2009 revealed that only 10 percent of respondents trusted the national court system. Less than 30 percent believed that it was possible to receive a fair trial in Ukraine.

Ukrainian politicians and analysts have described the system of justice in Ukraine as "rotten to the core" and have complained about political pressure put on judges and corruption.

Ukrainian judges have been arrested while taking bribes. Independent lawyers and human rights activists have complained Ukrainian judges regularly come under pressure to hand down a certain verdict.

In 2013, a Transparency International Global Corruption Barometer report showed that 66% of the Ukrainian public considered the judiciary to be the most corrupt institution in the country. Twenty-one percent of Ukrainians admitted they had paid bribes to judicial officials themselves.

=== Conviction rate ===
Courts maintained a 99.5 percent conviction rate from 2005 until 2008, equal to the conviction rate of the Soviet Union. In 2012 this number was 99.83 percent. Suspects are often incarcerated for long periods before trial.

=== Flaws in the system ===
Prosecutors in Ukraine have greater powers than in most European countries. According to the European Commission for Democracy through Law "the role and functions of the Prosecutor’s Office is not in accordance with Council of Europe standards".

Ukraine has few relevant corporate and property laws; this hinders corporate governance. Ukrainian companies often use international law to settle conflicts. Ukraine recognizes the verdicts of the European Court of Human Rights.

Council of Europe Commissioner for Human Rights Thomas Hammarberg stated in February 2012 that systemic deficiencies in the functioning of the Ukrainian judicial system seriously threatened human rights.

On July 25, 2012, a mass protest march took place from early morning to about 16:00 across the city of Kyiv of about 3,500 participants mostly of whom were sports fans of FC Dynamo Kyiv. The event took place soon after a decision was adopted by the Holosiivskyi District Court of Kyiv City on the 2011-12 nationally renown Pavlichenko criminal case convicting a family of Pavlichenkos (father and son) to long-term sentence for killing a judge of the Shevchenkivskyi District Court of Kyiv City Serhiy Zubkov. On 24 February 2014 the Verkhovna Rada (Ukraine's parliament) decided to release all political prisoners, including father and son Pavlichenko.

== History ==
Ukraine's judicial system was inherited from that of the Soviet Union and the former Ukrainian SSR. As such, it had many of the problems which marred Soviet justice, most notably a corrupt and politicised judiciary. Lawyers have stated trial results can be unfairly fixed, with judges commonly refusing to hear exculpatory evidence, while calling frequent recesses to confer privately with the prosecutor. Insiders say paying and receiving bribes is a common practice in most Ukrainian courts. Fee amounts depend on jurisdiction, the crime, real or trumped-up, and the financial wherewithal of the individual or company involved.

The Prosecutor-General's Office – part of the government – exerted undue influence, with judges often not daring to rule against state prosecutors. Those who did faced disciplinary actions; when a Kyiv court ruled for opposition politician Yulia Tymoshenko, the presiding judge was himself prosecuted. The courts were not even independent from each other, and it was commonplace for trial court judges to call the higher courts and ask how to decide a case. Courts were often underfunded, with little money or resources. It was not uncommon for cases to be heard in small, cramped courtrooms with the electricity cut off while prisoners were unable to attend because of lack of transport from jails to courtrooms.

Reformers highlighted the state of the judiciary as a key problem in the early 1990s and established a number of programmes to improve the performance of the judiciary. A Ukraine-Ohio Rule of Law Program was established in 1994 which brought together lawyers and judges from the American state of Ohio, including members of the Ohio Supreme Court, with their Ukrainian counterparts. The United States Agency for International Development supported these and other initiatives, which were also backed by European governments and international organisations.

These efforts proved controversial among some of the judicial old guard, but a band of reformist judges – dubbed the "judicial opposition" – increasingly gained support from reformers in local administrations who pushed for an end to judicial corruption. Judges were indicted en masse in Dnipro in the early 1990s, and later on judges from the Mykolayiv city court and the Moskovskyy district court of Kyiv were put on trial for corruption.

Major changes were made to the judicial system when the law "On the court system" was passed on 7 February 2002, creating a new level of judiciary and enacting institutional safeguards to insulate judges from political pressure.

President Viktor Yanukovych formed an expert group to make recommendations how to "clean up the current mess and adopt a law on court organization" on March 24, 2010. One day after setting this commission Yanukovych stated, "We can no longer disgrace our country with such a court system."

In December 2011 certain economic crimes were decriminalized.

Concrete steps the Azarov Government proposed the abolition of pre-trial detention for non-violent crimes, promoting experienced judges with strong records and punishing bribe-taking and corruption in the judiciary. A law passed in 2010 improved the basic salaries of judges, and a more rigorous method of selecting candidates for judges was introduced. But reforms brought many new problems: the Supreme Court lost almost all of its powers, judges become very dependent on the Supreme Council of Justice, and the ability to sue the government was severely limited.

A new criminal code came into effect on 20 November 2012.

On 8 April 2014 the Ukrainian Parliament adopted the law "On Restoring confidence in the judicial system of Ukraine". This bill established the legal and organizational framework for a special audit of judges of courts of general jurisdiction.

On 26 September 2015 Prime Minister Arseniy Yatsenyuk claimed Ukraine's court system would be reformed following the example of the National Police of Ukraine, meaning employing new personnel en masse.

In the last judicial reform introduced in 2016 the court system was completely overhauled, including the abolishing of certain courts. Advocacy operates in Ukraine to provide professional legal assistance. The independence of the lawyers is guaranteed. Only a lawyer represents another person in court, as well as defending against criminal charges.

A new Supreme Court was launched in December 2017.

The Kyiv Administrative District Court was disestablished in December 2022 due to its alleged corruption and powerful jurisdiction over national government agencies.

== See also ==
- Incarceration in Ukraine
- Judiciary of Russia
- Judicial reform in Ukraine
