= Andriy Portnov =

Ukrainian lawyer and politician (1973–2025)

- Андрій Портнов
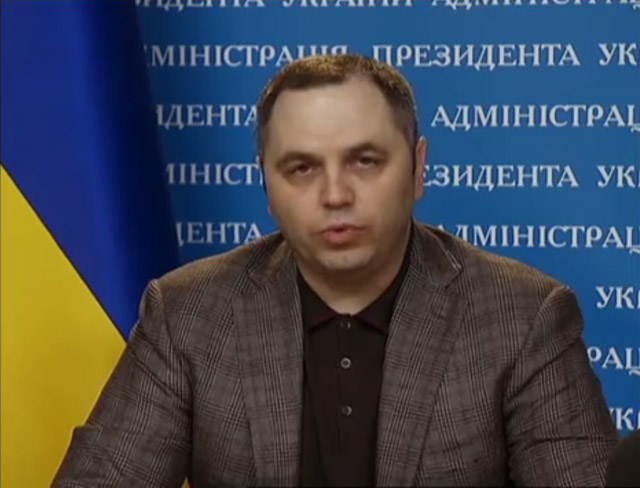
- Portnov in 2014

Member of the Verkhovna Rada
- In office 23 November 2007 – 16 April 2010
- In office 25 May 2006 – 15 June 2007

Personal details
- Born: Andriy Volodymyrovych Portnov; 27 October 1973 Luhansk, Ukrainian SSR, Soviet Union (now Ukraine)
- Died: 21 May 2025 (aged 51) Pozuelo de Alarcón, Spain
- Cause of death: Assassination
- Party: Independent; All-Ukrainian Union "Fatherland"
- Children: 2

Andriy Volodymyrovych Portnov (Ukrainian: Андрій Володимирович Портнов; 27 October 1973 – 21 May 2025) was a Ukrainian lawyer and politician.

From 2005 to 2010, Portnov headed the legal department of Yulia Tymoshenko's election headquarters. From 2 April 2010 to the end of February 2014, he was the Head of the Main Department for Judiciary of the Presidential Administration of Viktor Yanukovych and Deputy (then promoted to first deputy on 24 January 2014) Head of the Administration of the President of Ukraine. He was also a member of the Council of the National Bank of Ukraine from 2010 to 2014.

During the Euromaidan, Portnov was involved in the adoption of anti-protest laws in Ukraine. Immediately after the Euromaidan, on 20 February 2014, he left Ukraine. Between 2014 and 2015, he was under the sanctions of the European Union. He lived in Russia, then moved to Vienna, and practiced law there. On 19 May 2019, he returned to Ukraine. On 15 January 2020, the Pechersk Court of Kyiv ruled that, for the purposes of elections Portnov was a resident of Ukraine for the last five years.

A number of criminal cases were filed against Portnov, many of which were quashed. In 2018, Ukrainian investigators began investigating Portnov's involvement in the annexation of Crimea, and the Security Service of Ukraine opened a treason case, which was later closed.

On May 21, 2025, Portnov was assassinated near the American School of Madrid in Pozuelo de Alarcón, Spain, where his two children were enrolled. One of the perpetrators was then arrested and charged by the National Police for the murder of Portnov.

== Early life ==
Andriy Portnov was born on 27 October 1973 in Luhansk.

In 1990, Portnov graduated from secondary school No. 50 in Luhansk. From 1991 to 1992, he served in the Soviet Army and the Ukrainian Ground Forces.

From 1993 to 1994, Portnov worked as a legal adviser for Yurlit Ltd in Luhansk, while studying at the correspondence department of the law faculty of East Ukrainian State University. Then, for less than two years, he was a lawyer at the AP "Lugansk Oil Depot". In 1996, he headed the law firm Ukrinformpravo in Luhansk. He graduated from the university in 1999.

== Career ==
=== At the Securities Commission ===
In January 1997, Portnov began working in Kyiv at the State Commission on Securities and Stock Market. First, he held the position of chief specialist of the department of methodology and standardization of accounting and reporting of the corporate finance department. A few months later, he was appointed deputy head of the control and legal department and head of the law enforcement department.

From September 1997 to December 2001, he held the following positions in the commission: assistant to the chairman, head of the corporate finance department; the assistant to the chairman, leader of the group of assistants and advisers to the chairman; and head of the corporate finance department.

From January 2002 to May 2003, he was the director of the law firm Portnov and Partners, specializing in services in the field of investment business, corporate governance, privatization, and the securities market. The company was later renamed "Corporate Technologies". The firm itself and Portnov were repeatedly accused of raiding property between 2002 and 2010.

In June 2003, he returned to the State Commission and until July 2004, he worked as First Deputy Executive Secretary (Head of the Central Office).

In 2004, by the decree of the President of Ukraine, Portnov was awarded the title of Honored Lawyer of Ukraine.

=== In parliament ===
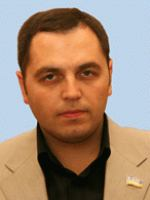
Official portrait, 2006

In July 2005, Portnov returned to law, which he was engaged in until April 2006. After the corruption scandal in Ukraine in September 2005, he represented in court the interests of Secretary of State Oleksandr Zinchenko, who accused the head of the National Security and Defense Council, Petro Poroshenko, and his entourage of corruption. The trial ended in Poroshenko's favor.

Before the 2006 parliamentary elections, Portnov was included in the list of the Yulia Tymoshenko Bloc (BYuT) and during the elections he headed the legal department of the factional headquarters, was elected a member of parliament as a deputy of the Verkhovna Rada of the 5th convocation.

At the early parliamentary elections in 2007, he re-entered parliament on the BYuT list, becoming a deputy of the Verkhovna Rada of the 6th convocation. He became a member of the parliamentary committee on justice. In 2008, he was elected deputy head of the BYuT faction. At the time he was a member of All-Ukrainian Union "Fatherland".

In parliament, there was an informal "Portnov group", which, in addition to Portnov, included Svyatoslav Oleynyk, Valeriy Pysarenko, and Volodymyr Pylypenko. From August to September 2008, on behalf of Tymoshenko, Portnov worked on joint bills with the Party of Regions that weakened the power of President Viktor Yushchenko. In 2008, together with the legal team, he prevented early parliamentary elections from being held. He was involved in support of gas contracts in Moscow in 2009 that ended the 2009 Russia–Ukraine gas dispute.

On 30 May 2009, according to the quota of law schools, by the decision of the 3rd All-Ukrainian Congress of representatives of higher educational institutions and scientific institutions, he was elected to a six-year term as a member of the High Council of Justice of Ukraine.

=== In the Presidential Administration ===
After Tymoshenko's defeat in the presidential elections of 2010, to Viktor Yanukovych, Portnov defended her interests in the Supreme Administrative Court. He later stated that he considered going to court as inappropriate and took up the case under pressure from Tymoshenko. After the presidential campaign, he stopped legal services for BYuT and resigned from the post of deputy head of the BYuT faction. Portnov's parliamentary group went over to the side of the Party of Regions.

On 2 April 2010, he accepted the offer of President Yanukovych to take the position of Deputy Head of the Administration of the President of Ukraine and the Head of the Main Directorate for Judicial Reform and Judicial System. To the BYuT faction, Portnov's transfer to the Yanukovych administration was negatively perceived as treason. Yanukovych introduced Portnov to the council of the National Bank of Ukraine, as well as to the supervisory boards of OJSC State Savings Bank of Ukraine and OJSC State Export-Import Bank of Ukraine.

In April 2011, as a result of the administrative reform, Portnov was transferred to the position of adviser to the president and head of the Main Directorate for the Judicial System of the Presidential Administration. In 2011, he headed a group to develop a draft of the new Criminal Procedure Code of Ukraine, which was adopted by parliament in April 2012, and entered into force in November 2012.

Members of parliament Pysarenko Pylypenko and Syvaloslav Oliynyk were the leaders of the ideas on changes in the legislation initiated by Portnov himself, in the parliament and society. They were referred to as the "Portnov group." Portnov said about the new code that it "introduces a competitive model of criminal proceedings of the European type." Experts and human rights activists had many comments and reservations about the new Code. On the one hand, it was a step forward in comparison with the old "Soviet" criminal procedure legislation, but on the other hand, the new Code set a number of problems which can create obstacles for Ukraine's movement towards legal legislation.

==== Euromaidan protests ====
During the Euromaidan, Portnov was a member of the working group on resolving the political crisis together with President Yanukovych and Minister of Justice Olena Lukash.

===== 16 January laws =====
Portnov is called the initiator of the development of the so-called "dictatorial laws" of 16 January 2014, which significantly limited the constitutional rights of Ukrainian citizens and were directed against Euromaidan. These laws were passed by the majority of the then parliament in violation of the rules, without discussion, by show of hands, without the use of the "Rada" system.

Despite a positive attitude towards them, he denied participation in their creation.

I did not take part in writing these laws, but as an official of the presidential administration at that time, due to my functional responsibilities, I also put my visa when they came from the parliament to be signed by the president.

— Andriy Portnov 22 January 2014

On 24 January 2014, by Decree No. 39/2014, President Yanukovych appointed Portnov as the First Deputy Head of the Presidential Administration.

On 22–24 February 2014, Portnov left Ukraine. He stated that he had been assaulted.

On 26 February 2014, Oleksandr Turchynov was sworn as acting President of Ukraine, and dismissed Portnov from the post of first deputy head of the administration.

On 28 February 2014, the Prosecutor General's Office of Ukraine sent a request to the Ministry of Internal Affairs and the Security Service of Ukraine to immediately detain those involved in the mass killings of activists in the center of Kyiv from 18 to 22 February 2014, which they suspected Portnov who was involved in those incidents within 10 days.

=== Sanctions ===
On 5 March 2014, the European Council approved the blocking of a total of 17 former government officials and people close to former President Yanukovych on suspicion of misappropriation of budget funds. Former Deputy Head of the Presidential Administration Portnov was also included in this list.

On 6 March 2014, the European Union and Canada announced that Portnov was on the list of high-ranking Ukrainian officials against whom financial sanctions were being imposed. Portnov himself declared that he had no financial assets abroad.

On 25 May 2014, the FMS of Russia granted him a temporary residence permit for a period of 3 years. He later moved to Vienna, where he practiced law.

On 25 August 2014, the Pechersky District Court of Kyiv partially satisfied Portnov's claim against the Prosecutor General's Office of Ukraine for the protection of honor, dignity and business reputation, ruling to declare unreliable information about his alleged involvement in the massacres of activists at Euromaidan during the early winter events of 2014.

On 9 October, the court ruled unreliable information about Portnov's alleged involvement in the plundering of land and real estate in Mezhyhirya and the legalization of funds, made public by the leadership of the General Prosecutor's Office of Ukraine addressed to him at a press conference on 20 May and ordered the General Prosecutor's Office of Ukraine within 10 days to publicly refute this.

At the end of December 2014, Portnov, who was living in Moscow (Russia) at that time, announced plans to return to Ukraine in 2015 due to the absence of legal charges against him. In the fall, the European Union received a written message that the Ukrainian law enforcement agencies had no procedural actions against the Klyuyev brothers and Portnov on charges of embezzlement.

During the process of high treason against Yanukovych, the special services of Ukraine provided recordings of telephone conversations between the assistant to the Russian President Sergey Glazyev, according to which Portnov during the annexation of Crimea by the Russian Federation participated in the development of a statement by the Supreme Council of the Autonomous Republic of Crimea.

The EU sanctions against Portnov were lifted on 5 March 2015. In October 2015, the EU court ruled in the case of Portnov v. European Council, recognizing that the imposition of sanctions solely on the basis of cooperation with the previous regime was unacceptable.

On 5 May 2015, Portnov, along with Oleksiy Azarov, and former Security Service of Ukraine (SBU) leaders Oleksandr Yakymenko and Ihor Kalinin were removed from the EU sanctions list.

In October 2015, the Court of Justice of the European Union, based in Luxembourg, ruled in Portnov v. EU Council in favor of Portnov and ruled that the imposition of sanctions was illegal.

In July 2019, the GPU (Prosecutor General's Office of Ukraine) sent a request to the Ukrainian Embassy in Canada to lift sanctions against Portnov. This was explained by the fact that no criminal cases and pre-trial investigations were being conducted against him in Ukraine. In November 2019, representatives of the Canadian government told reporters that Canada could lift sanctions on Portnov if the Prosecutor General's Office of Ukraine did not provide grounds for their extension. The GPU declined to comment on whether they intended to do so, citing the secrecy of the investigation.

On 27 November 2019, the Prosecutor General of Ukraine Ruslan Riaboshapka announced in the Verkhovna Rada that the GPU was still negotiating with the official authorities of Canada on sanctions against Portnov, but did not provide details.

On 10 December 2021 the U.S. Treasury Department imposed sanctions on Portnov for allegedly buying influence in the judiciary of Ukraine. The sanctions blocked any assets that Portnov may have had in the United States, barred Americans from conducting business transactions with him, and subjected people and firms that do business with him to potential penalties.

=== Emigration ===
At that time, he continued to provide legal advice to Kolomoisky, cooperation with whom began in 1999. He also provided legal support to Vyacheslav Khimikus, who accused ex-People's Deputy Serhiy Pashynskyi of shooting him in a leg.

From 27 August to 5 October 2018, he was the owner of the corporate rights to the news channel NewsOne, which eventually passed to the business partner and political associate of Viktor Medvedchuk, and Taras Kozak. He also managed the NewsOne TV channel, receiving 100% of the channel's shares from Volodymyr Murayev (Yevheniy Murayev's father).

=== Return to Ukraine ===
On 29 February 2019, at the request of Portnov's lawyer, the Pechersk Court of Kyiv set a deadline of 1 month for investigators of the Prosecutor General's Office to complete the pre-trial investigation and make procedural decisions in criminal proceedings against Portnov. The lawyer said that the proceedings of 6 March 2014 have been going on for four years and 10 months and violated reasonable deadlines. The Prosecutor General's Office of Ukraine refused to comply with the court's decision to close all criminal proceedings against Portnov by 20 March and filed a petition to clarify the court's decision.

During the 2019 presidential election, Portnov spoke in support of Volodymyr Zelenskyy as opposed to incumbent President Poroshenko, and after both went to the second round, he promised to return to the country. The candidate's team and those involved rejected any connection to Portnov and other Yanukovych-era officials along with Lukash, who also began to support Zelenskyy.

On 19 May 2019, on the eve of the second round of the presidential elections, he returned to Ukraine, along with Lukash.

After that, he began filing applications with the State Bureau of Investigation against former President Poroshenko: accusations of "criminal actions" during the 2018 Kerch Strait incident, "economic crimes", illegal purchase of the Pryamiy kanal TV channel, and "seizure of power" during the election of the Groysman Government in 2016. This activity was approved by the business partner of President Zelenskyy, Kolomoisky, who also had a conflict with Poroshenko during the latter's presidency. At the same time, he was summoned for interrogation in cases of murders during the Euromaidan as a witness. At the same time, he was lobbying for the closure of criminal cases against video blogger Anatoliy Shariy and the editor-in-chief of Strana.ua, Guzhva. He also openly clashed with Prosecutor General Ruslan Riaboshapka. Viktor Andrusiv, the executive director of the Ukrainian Institute of the Future, accused Prosecutor General Yuriy Lutsenko of inaction because Portnov had returned freely and had not been summoned for questioning, including on the 16 January laws. Lutsenko wrote in response: "Do you have evidence of a crime committed by him?" On 20 May, Portnov stated that he was guarded by Ukrainian law enforcement.

On 27 May, Portnov announced that he had submitted a fourth statement to the DBR (State Bureau of Investigation) requesting that criminal proceedings be opened against former President Poroshenko. The State Bureau of Investigation has registered Portnov's statement against President Petro Poroshenko. Portnov said he considered Poroshenko involved in "treason, attempts to seize state power, excess of power and official authority."

In June 2019, he was renewed as a professor at Shevchenko University at the Department of Constitutional Law, Faculty of Law.

On 19 June, it became known about Portnov's employment at the Department of Constitutional Law of the Law Faculty of the Taras Shevchenko National University of Kyiv under a fixed-term employment contract for a period from 1 September 2019 to 30 June 2020, prior to the competition for the position of professor of the department. Students of the educational institution announced protests against such a decision, and the next day the rector of the educational institution announced the cancellation of the decision to hire Portnov.

On 21 June 2019, the host of the Crime and Punishment program on NewsOne, co-host − TV channel producer, Vasiliy Holovanov, also participated in the Epicenter program. Because of this, students at Shevchenko University staged protests on 20 June near the "red" building. As a result, the university's leadership, including the rector of Taras Shevchenko National University of Kyiv Leonid Hubersky, read in the presence of students and members of the press an order to cancel the previous order appointing Portnov to the position of professor at the Department of Constitutional Law.

On 4 July 2019, Portnov wrote on Facebook that he had drafted a bill banning people holding public office from holding positions between Maidan's victory and Zelenskyy's inauguration. On 11 July, Zelenskyy himself took the same initiative, stating that "his team" had drafted a bill to "strengthen lustration." According to Texty.org.ua journalists, this indicates that Zelenskyy is openly cooperating with Portnov. According to journalists, this law is not about the dismissal or punishment of people guilty of something, but about the ban on working in power for all people whose only fault is that they held senior positions in Ukraine between 23 February 2014, and 19 May. 2019.

On 13 July, Portnov once again announced mass repression of former officials, calling the end of August.

In November 2019, together with blogger Anatoliy Shariy and Lukash, Portnov began to publish materials on the events of Euromaidan. From the materials, it was assumed that the death of a third of the people from the list of the Heavenly Hundred occurred outside Maidan Nezalezhnosti under circumstances that had no direct relation to the events during Euromaidan.

On 3 November 2019, Portnov's "PortNOW" program was launched on 112 Ukraine TV channel. The channel's management refused to disclose the nature of the cooperation.

On 5 January 2020, the Pechersk Court of Kyiv ruled that Portnov had lived in Ukraine for the last 5 years, despite the fact that on 22 February 2014, he had left Ukraine and returned only on 19 May 2019. Portnov explained his stay abroad as "political and unfounded criminal prosecution." The court's decision is due to the fact that on 14 April 2014, Portnov got the position of director of the department for legal assistance abroad in the law firm "Corporate Technologies". He was issued a business trip outside Ukraine for a period of 60 days and repeatedly extended it for five years.

After a year of Zelenskyy's presidency, the country is witnessing the emergence of a strong non-parliamentary opposition, which believes that the replacement of “new and inexperienced” personnel in power with such professional and consistent ones as Portnov can bring Ukraine out of the crisis.

On 17 June 2020, Portnov, commenting on the most relevant topics in the Ukrainian Format program on the NewsOne TV channel, formulated the necessary urgent measures to consistently fight the radical gangs.

From the beginning of February and at the end of June 2020, Portnov won lawsuits against Poroshenko, his party, European Solidarity, and the Pryamiy kanal TV channel in court. According to the court's decision, Poroshenko must publicly refute all the lies that he spread about Portnov's involvement in the transfer of criminal case materials to Russia, where the ex-president is the defendant, and also pay Portnov the costs of the trial.

On 8 January 2021, Portnov criticized those who, using double standards, deny the clear similarity between the 2021 United States Capitol attack and the Ukrainian Euromaidan, which the Democratic Party actively supported in 2014.

==== Conflict with journalists of Radio Liberty ====
On 31 October 2019, Portnov released the personal data of a member of the film crew of the "Schemes: Corruption in Detail" program of the Ukrainian edition of Radio Liberty, as well as data indicating the surveillance of this person. The editors considered this publication to be direct pressure on the Scheme team, which was preparing an investigation into Portnov's influence and his connections with the new Ukrainian government, as well as a violation of a number of articles of the law on the protection of personal data and the Criminal Code. Later, Portnov published the personal data of four more people associated with the program. The former official himself later accused the journalists of illegally spying on himself, and also appealed to his status as a journalist for Channel 112, whose management gave him an editorial task to inform the promise of illegal actions of people who are engaged in illegal operational-search activities.

On 14 November, the first meeting of the Council on Freedom of Expression and Protection of Journalists was held in the President's office, where the police and the Ministry of Internal Affairs heard about the cases on the statements of journalists and Portnov. Both cases were investigated by the Investigation Department of the National Police.

On 19 November, it became known about Portnov's trip to the president's office, where he complained to the deputy head of the OP, Kyrylo Timoshenko, about the "threat to freedom of speech and an obstacle to his advocacy and journalistic activities" by the journalists of Radio Liberty. In the statement of the office, the guest was called "a lawyer and a journalist", and it was also promised to take note of his arguments.

On 20 November, the Presidential Council for the Protection of Freedom of Expression and the Rights of Journalists condemned the pressure exerted by ex-deputy head of the Yanukovych Administration, Portnov on the Schema investigation program and urged him not to use his journalist ID, because he "is primarily a politician and professional lawyer." The decision was reviewed electronically and was supported by 9 out of 15 council members, it was not supported by representatives of the Novosti TV channels (Nataliya Vlashchenko with ZIK and Lyudmila Pysanko from 112 Ukraine), several people were abroad and did not take part in the voting. Portnov himself promised to take note of this decision, continuing to threaten to publish personal data of RS employees if he noticed them within a radius of 10 km.

=== Escape from Ukraine ===
According to the Schemes: Corruption in Details project of Radio Free Europe/Radio Liberty, on 3 June 2022, during the Russian invasion of Ukraine, Portnov fled the country through Zakarpattia Oblast. According to Serhii Sternenko, he fled the country with the help of Presidential aide Oleh Tatarov. His son had previously fled Ukraine on 23 March 2022.

== Criminal cases ==
=== Lawsuit against Poroshenko ===
In 2005, Portnov represented in court the interests of Oleksandr Zinchenko, Secretary of State of Ukraine. Portnov claimed that his law firm had provided free services to Zinchenko to help "fight corruption." In addition, Portnov tried in court to challenge the legality of the combination of Petro Poroshenko's parliamentary mandate and the position of Secretary of the National Security and Defense Council, and also proposed to re-privatize Poroshenko's property. Portnov lost the lawsuit against Poroshenko.

=== Mass killings during the 2014 Ukrainian revolution ===
On 28 February 2014, the Prosecutor General's Office of Ukraine sent a request to the Ministry of Internal Affairs and the Security Service of Ukraine to immediately detain persons involved in the massacre of activists in downtown Kyiv between 18 and 22 February 2014, against Portnov.

On 15 August 2014, the Pechersk District Court of Kyiv partially upheld Portnov's lawsuit against the Prosecutor General's Office of Ukraine for protection of honor, dignity and business reputation, ruling that the information about his alleged involvement in mass killings of activists during the 2014 Ukrainian revolution during the 2014 winter events was unreliable.

=== Proceedings on 6 March ===
On 6 March 2014, proceedings were opened against Portnov on the facts of threats to MPs, as well as misappropriation of funds of Kyiv National University and Kyiv National Economic University for ₴137.6 thousand, and possible misappropriation of illegal payments by a former AP employee in especially large amounts.

=== Waste of property ===
In May 2014, the Kyiv Prosecutor's Office opened criminal proceedings against Portnov under Part 2 of Art. 191 (misappropriation, misappropriation of property or taking it by abuse of office) and Part 1 of Art. 364 (abuse of power or official position) of the Criminal Code. Portnov was accused that in June 2010, using his official position, he illegally headed the Department of Constitutional Law of Kyiv National University. T. Shevchenko, as well as seized the funds of the university, never attending lectures. In addition, in order to illegally influence the judiciary, Portnov became a member of the High Council of Justice as a representative of a higher education institution.

On 24 February 2015, the case was reclassified, after the update of the notice of suspicion, only the accusation of seizing the university's salary under Art. 191 of the Criminal Code of Ukraine.

As of February 2015, Portnov was on the lists of the Ministry of Internal Affairs as a person hiding from the Prosecutor's Office of Ukraine. Article 191 part 3 of the Criminal Code was mentioned.

Until March 2016, the investigation was unable to identify the persons who seized the university's funds in the amount of ₴800, and the criminal proceedings were closed.

=== Theft of real estate in Mezhyhirya ===
On 9 October 2014, the court found unreliable information about Portnov's involvement in the theft of land and real estate in Mezhyhirya and money laundering, published by the leadership of the Prosecutor General's Office of Ukraine at a press conference on 20 May, and ordered the Prosecutor General's Office Ukraine within 10 days to publicly refute this information.

=== Portnov v. EU Council ===
In October 2015, the Court of Justice of the European Union, based in Luxembourg, ruled in Portnov v. EU Council in favor of Portnov and ruled that the imposition of sanctions was illegal. The court ruled that the imposition of sanctions solely on the basis of cooperation with the former regime was inadmissible. The only reason for imposing sanctions on Portnov was a letter from the Prosecutor General's Office of Ukraine, in which the GPU claimed that Portnov was involved in "the squandering of a significant amount of state funds and their illegal removal outside Ukraine." However, according to the court, the letter from Ukraine did not contain any other details as to the facts alleged against the plaintiff, and this was insufficient grounds for imposing sanctions on the officials.

=== Proceedings on illegal enrichment for ₴26 million ===
On 21 November 2017, proceedings were opened against Portnov, according to which in the period from July 2011 to 31 December 2013, he received illegal payments totaling ₴26 million. NABU investigated this case.

On 28 December 2018, the head of the Specialized Anti-Corruption Prosecutor's Office sent the case to the Prosecutor General's Office to continue the pre-trial investigation.

On 6 March 2019, the National Anti-Corruption Bureau closed the criminal proceedings, explaining it by the decision of the Constitutional Court to declare unconstitutional the article of the Criminal Code of Ukraine, which provided for liability for illicit enrichment.

=== High treason ===
In January 2018, during a hearing of the Obolon court in the case of treason against former President Yanukovych, prosecutors published a telephone conversation between Russian presidential adviser Sergey Glazyev and a certain "Vladimir Andreevich", recorded by Ukrainian intelligence on 1 March 2014. In the conversation, Glazyev informs his interlocutor that the Verkhovna Rada of the ARC must adopt a resolution prepared by Portnov.

On 3 February 2018, the Crimean Prosecutor's Office launched an investigation into Portnov's involvement in the occupation and annexation of Crimea.

On 26 March 2018, it became known that the SBU had initiated criminal proceedings against Portnov under Article 111 of the Criminal Code − treason.

This is evidenced by a recording of a telephone conversation between the adviser to the President of Russia Glazyev and the Chairman of the Verkhovna Rada of the ARC Konstantinov, which was recorded by Ukrainian intelligence on 1 March 2014. During the conversation, Glazyev informed about the need for the Verkhovna Rada of the ARC to adopt a resolution prepared by Portnov, a Ukrainian lawyer and former deputy head of the Presidential Administration.

— Andriy Levus

On 29 March 2018, it became known that Portnov filed a lawsuit against the SBU in the Shevchenkivsky District Court of Kyiv. In the lawsuit, he demands that the court declare the information about his treason unreliable.

No need to try. I applied to you two months ago… And you told me two months ago that you might do it if you need to.

— Andriy Portnov in April 2018 announcing on Facebook that he was ready to testify to prosecutors.

In August 2019, Portnov published official letters from the Prosecutor's Office of the Autonomous Republic of Crimea and the Security Service of Ukraine, according to which, following a pre-trial investigation, investigators decided to close the case due to lack of criminal offense.

=== Poroshenko's statements ===
On 25 June 2019, Ihor Holovan, Poroshenko's lawyer, said that a criminal case had been opened against Portnov under the article "knowingly false testimony" under the Criminal Code. Criminal proceedings have been registered for four episodes of Portnov's activity − statements on the incident with Ukrainian sailors in the Kerch Strait, on the TV channel "Pryamiy", on "Kuzny na Rybalskomu" and on the High Council of Justice.

=== Lawsuit against the Ministry of Foreign Affairs, the GPU and the Embassy of Ukraine in Canada ===
In February 2019, Portnov filed a lawsuit against the Ministry of Foreign Affairs of Ukraine, the Prosecutor General's Office, the Embassy of Ukraine in Canada and Ambassador Andriy Shevchenko for initiating the maintenance of sanctions against him in Canada. In his statement of claim, Portnov said that the Prosecutor General's Office and the Ambassador of Ukraine to Canada in correspondence with the Canadian authorities called him a suspect, and allegedly because of this he was included in the list of sanctions of this country (although, according to Portnov, he was not a suspect in any case). According to information published in the register of the Commissioner for Lobbying of Canada, in order to get rid of Canadian sanctions, Portnov hired two lobbyists.

In July 2019, the Pechersk Court of Kyiv upheld Portnov's lawsuit "for protection of honor and dignity" and decided to collect 7 million from the budget in favor of Portnov. His lawyer, Olena Isayevska, confirmed that the decision was made by Judge Serhiy Vovk.

=== Pressure on journalists ===
In November 2019, the national police registered a criminal case against Portnov, accusing him of pressuring the editorial board of the "Schemes: Corruption in Details" program (Radio Liberty project). Portnov first released the personal data of the driver of the film crew "Schemes" − because the editorial office was preparing an investigation into his connections with the new Ukrainian government, and later threatened the entire editorial office with detailed personal and personal information and details about private life.

The editorial board expressed pressure, the management of Radio Liberty condemned Portnov's threats to "Schemes", representatives of the Ukrainian media community made an open statement about Portnov's threats to the "Schemes" editorial board and called to bring Portnov to justice and guarantee the safety of journalists.

The National Police registered criminal proceedings under two articles of the Criminal Code of Ukraine − "obstruction of the lawful professional activity of journalists" and "threat or violence against a journalist."

The next day, the police opened a case on Portnov's statement about obstruction of his journalistic activity, which was based on a certificate from the Ukrainian TV channel "112" that he had become a special correspondent of the TV company and had a written editorial assignment. The TV channel refused to comment on this, citing the confidentiality of cooperation.

=== Threats to the Prosecutor of the Prosecutor General's Office of Ukraine ===
On 29 November 2019, the Prosecutor General's Office Oleksandr Bozhko appealed to the Qualification and Disciplinary Commission of Advocates of the Kyiv Region with a complaint against Portnov. It reported threats of violence sent to his mobile phone. The text of the reports published by the Ukrainian media contains abusive words with threats of sexual acts against the prosecutor. Bozhko stated that Portnov confirmed the authenticity of the messages sent on his social networks and asked to revoke Portnov's lawyer's license for violating the lawyer's oath.

=== Other criminal cases ===
On 15 January 2015, the Ministry of Internal Affairs of Ukraine declared Portnov wanted in a criminal case, on the basis of Art. 191 part 3 of the Criminal Code (misappropriation of property by abuse of office). According to the Kyiv Prosecutor's Office, in June 2010, Portnov, with the help of his official position, illegally headed the Department of Constitutional Law of the Taras Shevchenko National University of Kyiv, and also seized the university's funds in the form of salaries. In addition, in order to illegally influence the judicial system of Ukraine, Portnov became a member of the High Council of Justice as a representative of a higher education institution.

Portnov denied all these accusations, considering them a manifestation of political persecution. On 28 May 2015, the relevant criminal investigation was launched by the Prosecutor General's Office of Ukraine. On 12 November 2015, the Pechersk District Court of Kyiv terminated the search for Portnov in connection with the establishment of his whereabouts.

On 8 January 2016, the Chancellery of the Court of Justice in Luxembourg reported that the Council of the European Union had not lodged an appeal within the prescribed time and the EU Court's decision of 26 October 2015 declaring all EU Council decisions imposing international sanctions on Andrei Portnov illegal. The European Court of Justice in Luxembourg, after analyzing the accusations against Portnov by the Ukrainian authorities, the position of the EU ambassador to Ukraine and the acts of the EU Council, found the EU Council's decision contrary to European standards, completely lifted the sanctions and ordered the EU to pay Portnov's expenses.

On 12 April 2016, the European Union complied with the decision of the EU Court of Justice in the Portnov VS EU Council case, which recognized the unlawful actions of the EU Council on the introduction of international sanctions against Portnov. On 20 December 2018, a federal court in Canada refused to lift sanctions from the former official and pay him monetary compensation.

In November 2019, the journalistic project "Slidstvo.Info" reported that since 2017, Portnov, through social networks and instant messengers, had dealt with threats to prosecutors who worked on criminal cases with his participation. In the spring of 2019, the RRB opened criminal proceedings on the fact of threats to one of the prosecutors, at the same time opening an investigation against the prosecutor himself on the initiative of Portnov's lawyer. Subsequently, the GPU decided to withdraw the investigation of threats from the State Security Bureau and handed it over to the Security Service.

== Scientific activity ==
In 2001, he defended his dissertation on "Activities of foreign investors in the stock market of Ukraine (motivation and regulation)" at the Kyiv National Economic University named after Vadym Hetman, receiving the degree of Candidate of Economic Sciences. In September 2009, he defended his thesis for the degree of Doctor of Law on the topic "Formation and development of constitutional proceedings in Ukraine: problems of theory and practice." From October 2009, he was a Doctor of Law.

From November 2009, he was a Professor of the Department of Constitutional and Administrative Law of the Law Faculty of the Taras Shevchenko National University of Kyiv.

He was a member of the Specialized Academic Council of the Vadym Hetman Kyiv National Economic University.

He was the author of two scientific monographs and more than 30 scientific works on the problems of legal regulation of constitutional proceedings and the theory of constitutional process.

== Family ==
Portnov was married with a son, Ihor (born 1993), and a daughter, Lilia (born 1994). He had two more children, who were educated at the American School, site of his death.

Until the fall of 2016, Portnov's sister worked in the Pechersk Court.

In 2025, it was reported that following his death, Portnov's partner, Anastasiia Valiaieva, had purchased 6 properties in Dubai, registered to her and to his daughter, Liliia Portnova.

== Death ==
On May 21, 2025, Portnov was gunned down by unidentified gunmen near the American School of Madrid in Pozuelo de Alarcón, Spain, on 21 May 2025. He was 51 years old.

=== Perpetrators and trial ===
One of the gunmen was arrested by the National Police and charged with Portnov's murder. The police found nine bullet casings near him and suspect three men were involved in the shooting. On 25 February 2026, another suspect was arrested in Heinsberg, Germany.
