= Symonenko =

Symonenko (Ukrainian: Симоненко) is a gender-neutral Ukrainian language surname, derived from the given name Symon. Notable people with the surname include:

- Alexander Symonenko (born 1974), Ukrainian track cyclist
- Kostiantyn Symonenko (born 1974), Ukrainian traveler, writer.
- Oleksiy Symonenko (born 1976), Ukrainian lawyer
- Petro Symonenko (born 1952), Ukrainian politician and the First Secretary of the Communist Party of Ukraine
- Serhiy Symonenko (born 1981), Ukrainian footballer
- Valentyn Symonenko (born 1940), Ukrainian politician and former acting prime minister
- Vasyl Symonenko (1935–1963), Ukrainian poet
