= Oleh Tatarov =

Ukrainian lawyer and public servant

- Олег Юрійович Татаров
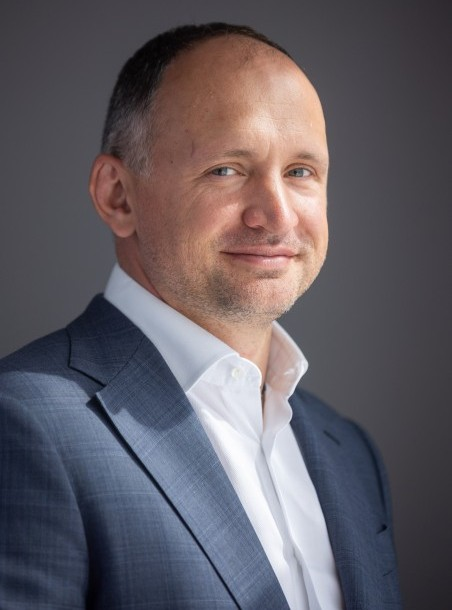

Deputy Head of the Office of the President of Ukraine
- Incumbent
- Assumed office 5 August 2020
- President: Volodymyr Zelenskyy

Personal details
- Born: 31 August 1982 (age 44) Novoukrainka, Kirovohrad Oblast, Ukrainian SSR
- Education: National Academy of Internal Affairs; Taras Shevchenko National University of Kyiv; University of London
- Occupation: jurist, statesman
- Awards: Yaroslav the Wise Award; Honored Lawyer of Ukraine

Oleh Yuriiovych Tatarov (Ukrainian: Олег Юрійович Татаров; 31 August 1982) is a Ukrainian lawyer and administrator. He began working in the Ministry of Internal Affairs in 1999, later becoming its deputy head in 2011, before being dismissed from his post in 2014 following the Revolution of Dignity which he had worked to suppress under then Minister of the Interior Vitaliy Zakharchenko. In 2020, he made a return to politics after he was nominated Deputy Head of the Office of the President of Ukraine by Volodymyr Zelenskyy.

== Early life ==
Tatarov was born in Novoukrainka in the Kirovohrad Oblast. He has been involved in Thai boxing since childhood and heads the Kyiv Thai Boxing Federation.

In 2003, Tatarov graduated from the National Academy of Internal Affairs. In 2005, he received a master's degree from the National Academy of Internal Affairs.

In 2010, he graduated from the Taras Shevchenko National University of Kyiv with a degree in accounting and auditing.

Tatarov graduated from the University of London and obtained a European bar license.

== Legal and administrative career ==
Oleh Tatarov is a Doctor of Law and a Professor. He is an active member of specialised academic councils for the defence of PhD and doctoral theses. He is a member of the editorial board of the scientific and practical journal “Bulletin of Criminal Procedure”. Tatarov is also the author of more than 300 scientific and educational works on criminal procedure and forensic science. Part-time, Tatarov has taught in law schools such academic disciplines as: “Criminal Procedure”, “International Legal Aid in Criminal Proceedings”, “Evidence in Criminal Proceedings”, “Organisation of Unit Cooperation during Pre-trial Investigations” and “Modern Aspects of Criminal Law and Procedure”.

Between 1999 and 2014, he served in the internal affairs agencies. In 2011, he was appointed as Deputy Head of the Main Investigation Department of the Ministry of Internal Affairs. During this period, he was a member of various working groups on the legal regulation of pre-trial investigation, prosecution and defence.

=== Activities during Euromaidan ===
As the Deputy Head of the Ministry of Internal Affairs of the Yanukovych administration during the Revolution of Dignity, Tatarov was tied to a number of violent events.

On the night of 11 December 2013, police officers made an unsuccessful attempt to break up Euromaidan barricades in Kyiv, in which more than 5,000 security forces took part. Berkut and Interior Ministry units attempted to violently disperse the protesters. That night, 42 protesters were injured by the police units. Tatarov justified this by "the need to guarantee the safe passage of public transport".

On 25 December 2013, journalist and Maidan activist Tetiana Chornovol was severely wounded during an attack. Chornovol's car was rammed off of the road by a Porsche Cayenne, and two assailants dragged her from her car, beat her, and threw her in a roadside ditch. The attack took place hours after Chernovol published an article on a posh suburban residence which she said was being built for Minister of Internal Affairs Vitaliy Zakharchenko, Tatarov's boss at the time. In response to the attack, Oleh Tatarov stated that it could be a staged provocation by the activist herself.

On 22 January 2014, the leader of the Automaidan organization, Dmytro Bulatov, disappeared. On 30 January, he was found alive in the village of Vyshenki near Kyiv and taken to a hospital. The activist had numerous hematomas, a cut cheek, and part of his right ear was cut off. Bulatov spoke about torture by kidnappers who spoke with a Russian accent. Then they took him to the forest and threw him out of the car. Bulatov was blindfolded during the entirety of his kidnapping. Following this, Tatarov stated that as one of the leads for Bulatov's disappearance that the investigators were considering was a staged effort for the purpose of provocation. Tatarov stated that just before his kidnapping, Bulatov had purchased an expensive laptop using donation money from Euromaidan supporters, and had later purchased money from iTunes. The accusations were refuted by Bulatov, who had denounced the theft of his credit card during his kidnapping.

The three days of 18, 19 and 20 February became the bloodiest of the Revolution of Dignity, with 80 protesters and 13 law enforcement officers being killed. On 19 February during a press conference, Tatarov stated that police officers did not use firearms on protesters, and that some of the dead protesters had "wounds in the back of their heads, which makes it possible to make a conclusion that the shots were made by nearby individuals that were amid the protesters".

On 18 February 2021, the journalists of the "Schemes" program reported that Tatarov, in the midst of the Revolution of Dignity, received the title of "Honored Lawyer of Ukraine" from Yanukovych on the personal application of the then head of the Ministry of Internal Affairs, Vitaly Zakharchenko, submitted on 16 December 2013.

=== Lawyer work ===
Following the conclusion of the Revolution of Dignity, Tatarov was removed from his post. Following this, he resumed practicing law, working as a managing partner of Tatarov, Farynnyk, Holovko. From 2014 to 2020, he practised as a lawyer and was a professor at the Department of Criminal Procedure of the National Academy of Internal Affairs (part-time). He worked as the lawyer of the ex-deputy head of the Yanukovych administration, Andriy Portnov. In 2016, he was the lawyer of the People's Deputy of the Opposition Bloc Vadym Novynskyi. He was the lawyer of Olesya Kuznetsova, the widow of Ivan Kuznetsov, one of the two perpetrators of the attempted murder of Serhii Sternenko. In May 2019, he requested that the Security Service of Ukraine investigate Sternenko for "intentional murder" and attempted murder over the case, provoking strong criticism.

=== Deputy Head of the Office of the President of Ukraine ===
On 5 August 2020, he was appointed Deputy Head of the Office of the President of Ukraine (OPU) by President Volodymyr Zelenskyy's decree. Tatarov started in the presidential team by coordinating the work of law enforcement agencies: the National Anti-Corruption Bureau of Ukraine, the Security Service of Ukraine, the State Bureau of Investigation of Ukraine, and the National Police of Ukraine. Tatarov was later the head of several different parts of the Ukrainian criminal justice system – the bodies of pre-trial investigation, including the prosecutor's office, and the courts that hear criminal cases.

==== Criticism of the appointment ====
Tatarov's appointment drew immediate and fierce criticism from Euromaidan activists and families of the victims and outrage among the general public. On 7 August 2020, the citizens' association "Family of the Heavenly Hundred" opposed the appointment of Tatarov as deputy head of the OPU because of his past, stating that Tatarov had "justified and covered up mass crimes and violations of human rights during the Revolution of Dignity" and that he had worked in the Ministry of Internal Affairs under the leadership of Vitaly Zakharchenko, who fled to Russia after Euromaidan.

Volodymyr Zelenskyy responded to the criticism later the same day, saying that he considered it unfair that every single person who held a governmental position during the presidency of Viktor Yanukovych should continue to be considered a representative of the "old government". He stated that "the most important thing is for a person to demonstrate honesty and integrity."

In June 2021, the head of the Anti-Corruption Action Center, Vitalii Shabunin, initiated a petition for the dismissal of Oleh Tatarov from the position of deputy head of the OPU. As of 18 June, the petition had 25,000 signatures. Volodymyr Zelenskyy answered it on 6 July, stating that the law did not require him to fire Tatarov as a result of the petition.

=== Activities during the Russian invasion of Ukraine ===
According to the Anti-Corruption Action Center, Oleh Tatarov helped Viktor Medvedchuk (to whose youngest daughter Putin is godfather), former deputy head of the Presidential Administration of Ukraine during Viktor Yanukovych's presidency, Andriy Portnov, and Portnov's son of draft age, who left the country on 28 March 2022, escape from Ukraine. In addition, Oleh Tatarov tried to unblock the accounts of the Mykolaiv Alumina Plant, which is owned by the Russian billionaire Oleg Deripaska, frozen in Ukraine.

During an August 2024 press conference President Volodymyr Zelenskyy stated "The United States and everyone knows this. Oleh Tatarov together with Vasyl Malyuk killed Chechens in Ukraine in Kyiv, while you were not here."

== Investigations and other controversies ==
=== UkrBud case ===
Starting from 2017, the National Anti-Corruption Bureau of Ukraine (NABU) began investigating Oleh Tatarov for possible misuse and embezzlement of money during the construction of housing for the National Guard. The construction was conducted by the UkrBud company of Maksym Mykytas. The National Anti-Corruption Bureau of Ukraine and the Specialized Anti-Corruption Prosecutor's Office (SAPO) suspected Tatarov of complicity in providing a bribe in the form of a parking space in the "Artemivskyi" housing complex from People's Deputy Maksym Mykytas to Kostyantyn Dubonos, deputy director of the State Scientific Research Expert and Forensic Center of the Ministry of Internal Affairs of Ukraine. Law enforcement officers believe that at the request of the developers, Tatarov agreed with the Kyiv NDEKC of the Ministry of Internal Affairs in 2020 to write an examination with distorted content, which was later referred to in "UkrBud". According to the NABU investigators, the forensic expert, who worked at the Kyiv Scientific Research Institute of Forensic Expertise of the Ministry of Internal Affairs, was to be given a parking space worth ₴250,000 in exchange for creating fake documents to hide losses of ₴80,000,000. NABU published documents that it stated show WhatsApp correspondence establishing Tatarov's agreement to bribery. Maksym Mykytas, former head of the construction company Ukrbud, testified in court that in 2019, when Mykytas was a suspect in a case of theft, Tatarov gave a US$600,000 bribe to High Anti-Corruption Court of Ukraine (HACC) employees to convince the HACC to release Mykytas on bail at a low value of the bail bond. Mykytas also testified that he himself had given a bribe to judges of Solomianskyi District Court, via Tatarov.

On 28 November 2020, Tatarov stated that NABU Director Artem Sytnyk is "the root of problems in the anti-corruption policy of the state". The president's office, for its part, said that Tatarov expressed a personal opinion which does not reflect the position of the President of Ukraine Volodymyr Zelenskyy.

On 1 December 2020, it became known that NABU was proceeding with the case against Tatarov. The case concerns his possible involvement in the falsification of papers in the case of ex-National Deputy and developer Maksym Mykytas. NABU, among other things, conducts the hearing of the deputy head of the Office of the President of Ukraine. On 2 December, the NABU and SAPO prepared to file charges against Oleh Tatarov, but the then Prosecutor General of Ukraine Iryna Venediktova suspended all four prosecutors who handled this case. The prosecutors who were supposed to present the charges in court were secretly changed to others, and the case was taken from NABU and SAPO and transferred to the Security Service of Ukraine (SBU), which is believed to be a pre-trial investigation body more loyal to Tatarov, due to close friendly ties with the department's leadership. Subsequently, NABU openly accused Venediktova's office of deliberately sabotaging the Tatarov case. Transparency International interpreted the initial change in prosecutors as an "attempt to sabotage the case" and the case as a whole as having been "buried".

On 4 December, a protest was held near the Office of the President of Ukraine, the participants of which demanded the release of Iryna Venediktova, the head of the Office of the President Andriy Yermak, and his deputy Oleh Tatarov. Tatarov, commenting on the protest outside the President's Office, during which his resignation was demanded, stated that while he is in his position, he intends to continue to promote the policy of reducing the influence on Ukraine of the forces that are trying to impose "foreign rule" on the country, a thesis promoted by Russian propaganda after the beginning of the Russian-Ukrainian war in 2014.

On 9 December, a protest with posters "Corruption kills" and "Stop corruption" was held near the Office of the President of Ukraine. The rallyists called on the President of Ukraine, Volodymyr Zelenskyy, to clear the Office of the President of corruption. In addition, the participants of the action submitted an appeal demanding the release of Oleh Tatarov and other persons who, according to them, appear in corruption cases.

On 12 December, Oleh Tatarov announced that he intended to file a lawsuit against NABU director Artem Sytnyk for "protection of honor, dignity and business reputation."

On 21 December, Tatarov wrote a statement about the suspension of his official duties as the deputy head of the Office of the President of Ukraine "in connection with a significant public outcry." He later returned to work.

During the investigation, the Prosecutor General of Ukraine, Iryna Venediktova twice replaced the prosecutors responsible for the case. On 23 December 2020, Deputy Prosecutor General Oleksiy Symonenko transferred the case to the Security Service of Ukraine (SBU). NABU considered the transfer to be illegal.

A 13 January 2021 decision of the High Anti-Corruption Court of Ukraine (HACC) stated that the case was in the jurisdiction of NABU. Anti-Corruption Action Center (AntAC) interpreted the decision as legally obliging Venediktova to return the case to NABU. According to The Kyiv Independent, the SBU did not carry out any investigation.

On 14 December 2021, the Shevchenkivsky District Court ordered the case against Tatarov to be closed, on the grounds that the case had passed the time limit for investigation.

=== Dairing Capital ===
On 3 December 2020, journalists from Bihus.info released an investigative report in which it is noted that the company "Dairing Capital", which is co-owned by the father-in-law of the deputy head of the Office of the President Oleh Tatarov, Oleksandr Pavlushin, received land for development from the Kyiv City Council immediately after Tatarov was appointed to the Office of the President.

Tatarov called this report "fake news" and turned to law enforcement officers to sue the writers.

=== SAPO election ===
Tatarov is associated with individual members of the commission for the election of the head of SAPO, which, with the tacit consent of top state officials, obstructed the appointment of the head of the SAPO for more than a year and a half. Oleksandr Klymenko, a former NABU investigator, who is known for investigating Tatarov's case of embezzlement during the construction of housing for the National Guard, was appointed in July 2022.

== Recognition ==
In April 2021, the annual international legal directory The Legal 500 added Oleh Tatarov to the list of leading lawyers in the field of white-collar crime in spite of him being accused of corruption. In December 2021, the magazine Focus ranked Tatarov in 12th place among the most influential people of Ukraine because of his increased influence on the judicial system in the country.

== Awards ==
- Yaroslav the Wise Award (November 2013);
- Honored Lawyer of Ukraine (January 2014).
