= Tatarov =

Tatarov is a surname that may refer to:

== People ==
- Oleh Tatarov (b. 1981), a Ukrainian lawyer and politician
- Vadim Tatarov (b. 1971), a Moldovan swimmer
