= Andriy Kostin =

Ukrainian lawyer and politician

- Андрій Костін
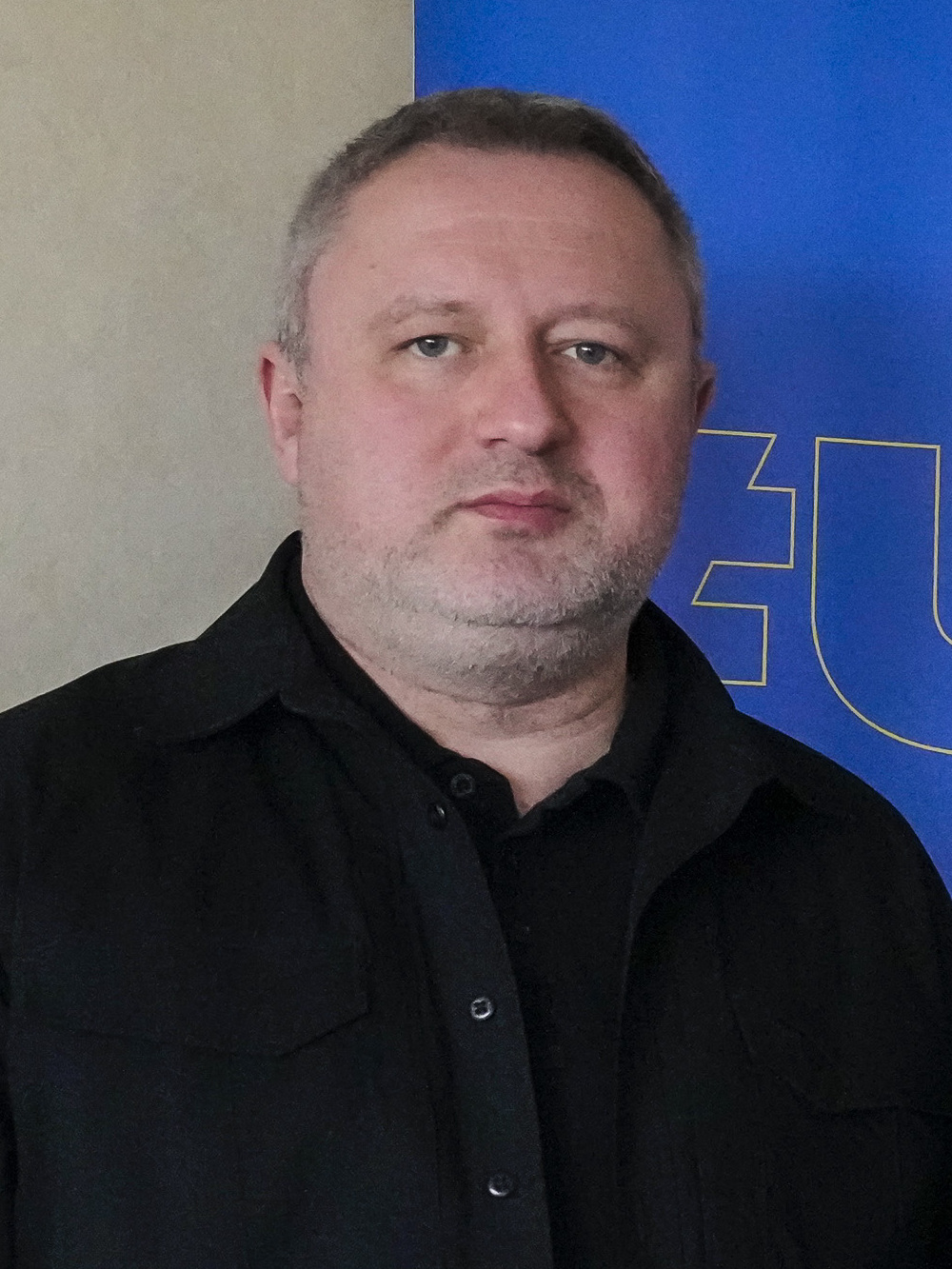
- Kostin in 2023

Prosecutor General of Ukraine
- In office 27 July 2022 – 31 October 2024
- President: Volodymyr Zelenskyy
- Preceded by: Oleksiy Symonenko (acting)
- Succeeded by: Ruslan Kravchenko

Personal details
- Born: 17 April 1973 (age 53) Odesa, Ukrainian SSR, Soviet Union, (now Ukraine)
- Party: Servant of the People (2019-2022)
- Other political affiliations: Independent
- Education: Odesa University
- Awards: Honored Lawyer of Ukraine

Andriy Yevhenovych Kostin (Ukrainian: Андрій Євгенович Костін; born 17 April 1973) is a Ukrainian lawyer, politician and diplomat.

He was elected as a People's Deputy of Ukraine in 2019. Kostin was a candidate in the 2021 competition to become the new head of the Ukrainian Specialized Anti-Corruption Prosecutor's Office (SAPO). Civil society organisations Transparency International Ukraine, Automaidan, Anti-Corruption Action Center and Dejure stated that Kostin did not satisfy the integrity criteria of the competition. Kostin was not selected. Kostin was the Head of the Verkhovna Rada Legal Policy Committee for two years, from 2020 to 2022. On 27 July 2022, Kostin was voted by the Verkhovna Rada (parliament of Ukraine) as the Prosecutor General of Ukraine. He tended in his resignation on 22 October 2024, which was approved by the Verkhovna Rada on 29 October. In May 2025, he became Ukrainian ambassador to The Netherlands.

== Education ==
Andriy Kostin studied law from 1990 to 1995 at Odesa University. He qualified as a lawyer in 1995.

== Lawyer ==
Kostin was an attorney at Polonsky & Partners in Odesa from 1995 to 1998. He became deputy director and then Director of Pravo, a legal firm, starting in 1998. Kostin has held several roles in lawyers' organisations in Odesa and internationally. He was a member of the International Bar Association Council from 2013 to 2015.

== Member of parliament ==
Kostin served as a member of Verkhovna Rada (the Ukrainian parliament) from the Servant of the People party from 2019 to 2022.

=== Competition for head of SAPO ===
In 2021, a commission was established to interview candidates for the head of the Ukrainian Specialized Anti-Corruption Prosecutor's Office (SAPO), a key position for resolving corruption in Ukraine. Kostin was a candidate.

In May 2021, the civil society organisations Transparency International Ukraine, Automaidan, Anti-Corruption Action Center and Dejure described Kostin as one of the candidates with "significant violations and a large discrepancy between these candidates and the integrity criteria" of the competition. The Open Register of National Public Actors of Ukraine stated that Kostin's wife was an assistant consultant for fellow Servant of the People parliamentarian and committee member Maksym Dyrdin, whose own wife was an assistant consultant to Kostin. The civil society organisations described this as "possible nepotism". Verkhovna Rada records stated that Kostin received ₴20,000 per month for rental compensation during 2019–2020 without declaring any residence in Kyiv. In 2019, Kostin sold two flats in Odesa for a total of ₴1.2 million without reporting the sale to the National Agency for Prevention of Corruption (NAPC).

Kostin was among the 37 candidates who qualified for an interview, which was scheduled for 4 June 2021. Olena Shcherban, a lawyer of the Anti-Corruption Action Center, stated that Kostin should have been ineligible under the criteria for political neutrality, since he was a member of the Servant of the People party and was the head of the Verkhovna Rada legal policy committee. In his "integrity interview", Kostin was questioned by the commission about his visit to Crimea, occupied by Russian security forces. Following his integrity interview, Kostin did not qualify for further steps in the competition.

=== Legislative actions ===
In July 2021, while legislation for creating the Ukrainian Ethics Council was being debated, Kostin proposed an amendment to reduce the mandate of international members of the Council from six years, as proposed by the Venice Commission, to three years. His amendment was rejected.

=== Minsk agreements ===
In November 2021, as deputy chair of the Ukrainian delegation to the Trilateral Contact Group on Ukraine negotiating the Minsk agreements that aimed to resolve the War in Donbas, Kostin stated that the Russian delegation "didn't want to continue" negotiations on a draft law for local self-government in Donbas.

=== Prosecutor General ===
On 27 July 2022, Kostin was voted by the Verkhovna Rada, the Ukrainian parliament, as the new Prosecutor General of Ukraine, in replacement of Iryna Venediktova.

== Scandals ==
=== Refusal to initiate criminal proceedings ===
On 3 November 2022, Kostin, refused to open a case against his former party colleague Iryna Allakhverdiyeva for receiving a gift of ₴20 million within the prescribed period. She also received a watch DEFY MIDNIGHT for ₴310 thousand, encrusted with 11 white diamonds.

=== Draft-dodging scandal ===
Kostin tended in his resignation as prosecutor-general on 22 October 2024. He did so while taken responsibility for a national draft-dodging scandal. Following the 2022 Russian invasion of Ukraine, dozens of Ukrainian officials are alleged to have abused their position to avoid military service by having received false disability status declarations. His resignation was approved by the Verkhovna Rada on 29 October.
