= Iryna Kormyshkina =

Ukrainian politician (born 1978)

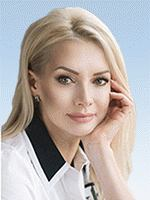
Iryna Kormyshkina

Iryna Valeriivna Kormyshkina (née Allakhverdiyeva) (born 26 August 1978) is a Ukrainian economist and politician. She was a People's deputy of Ukraine of the 9th convocation from 2019 until her resignation late February 2025.

In 2023 she married Mykolaiv Oblast Council deputy Yuriy Kormyshkin (Note: At the time of marriage (2023) Yuriy Kormyshkin was a Mykolaiv Oblast Council deputy for the party Our Land.) and consequently changed her last name to Kormyshkina.

== Early life and education ==
Iryna Allakhverdiyeva was born on August 26, 1978, in Mykolaiv. She graduated from the Mykolaiv State Agrarian Academy, majoring in accounting and auditing. Allakhverdiyeva is an economist in accounting and finance.

== Career ==
Iryna Allakhverdiyeva was director of the Mykolaiv regional directorate at the private joint-stock insurance company Unica; deputy director for development at the Mykolaiv branch of closed joint-stock insurance company INGO Ukraine; and deputy director of the Mykolaiv city closed joint-stock insurance agency Inkomstrakh.

Allakhverdiyeva was elected to the Verkhovna Rada (the national parliament of Ukraine) on the party list of the Servant of the People party in the 2019 Ukrainian parliamentary election. She served as a member of Committee on Finance, Tax, and Customs Policy and chairwoman of the Subcommittee on Tariff and Non-Tariff Regulation.

On 3 November 2022, journalists pressured Prosecutor General Andriy Kostin to open criminal proceedings against Allakhverdiyeva for allegedly receiving illegal benefits: gifts worth 14.4 million hryvnias and 5.3 million hryvnias, as well as a DEFY MIDNIGHT watch, inlaid with eleven white diamonds, worth 310,000 hryvnias. On 16 October 2024, the National Anti-Corruption Bureau and Specialized Anti-Corruption Prosecutor's Office charged Kormyshkina with illegally enriching herself in excess of 20 million Ukrainian hryvnia. She was released from jail the same day after the court received "personal guarantees" from Davyd Arakhamia, head of the Servant of the People parliamentary faction, and Governor of Mykolaiv Oblast Vitalii Kim.

On 21 February 2025, Kormyshkina reportedly submitted her resignation from the Verkhovna Rada. Parliament approved her resignation on 25 February 2025, with 246 votes in favor.
