= Davyd Arakhamia =

Ukrainian politician (born 1979)

- Давид Арахамія დავით არახამია
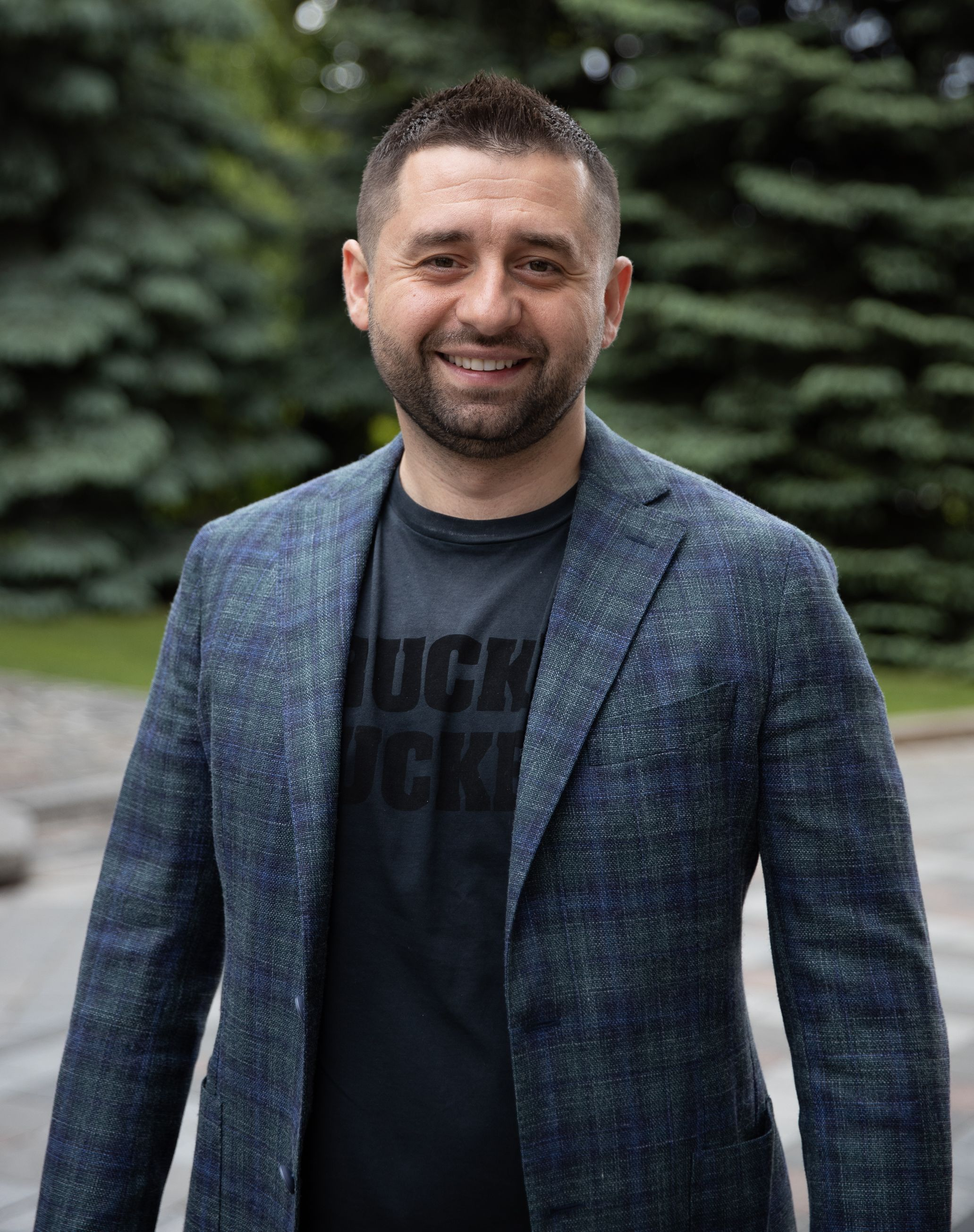
- Arakhamia in 2020

Faction leader of Servant of the People
- Incumbent
- Assumed office 29 August 2019
- Preceded by: Position established

People's Deputy of Ukraine
- Incumbent
- Assumed office 29 August 2019
- Constituency: Servant of the People, No. 4

Personal details
- Born: 23 May 1979 (age 47) Sochi, Russian SFSR, Soviet Union
- Party: Servant of the People
- Education: European University (Kyiv); Open University
- Occupation: Entrepreneur

Davyd Heorhiyovych Arakhamia (Note: Ukrainian: Давид Георгійович Арахамія Georgian: დავით გიორგის-ძე არახამია) (born in Sochi, 23 May 1979), also known by the pseudonym David Braun, is a Georgian─Ukrainian politician and entrepreneur who has served as parliamentary faction leader of Ukrainian President Volodymyr Zelenskyy's Servant of the People party since 29 August 2019. Arakhamia was elected as a member of the Verkhovna Rada in 2019.

== Early life and career ==
David Heorhiyovych Arakhamia was born on 23 May 1979 in Sochi in Russian SFSR. He lived in Gagra, Georgia until 1992 when, fleeing the war in Abkhazia, he moved with his parents to Mykolaiv, Ukraine.

Arakhamia studied economics at the European University in Kyiv. Arakhamia passed the Professional Management master course at the Open University in Milton Keynes.

He is a co-founder of several IT companies including TemplateMonster and Weblium.

In March 2014, after the outbreak of the Donbas War, Arakhamia, along with friends, started a website to raise funds for the equipment of the paratroopers of the 79th Air Assault Brigade.

== Political career ==
Arakhamia was appointed as an Adviser to the Governor of Mykolaiv Oblast in August 2014. In October 2014, he became Adviser to the Minister of Defense and Chairman of the Council of Volunteers at the Ministry of Defense.

He has served as Secretary of the National Investment Council of Ukraine since August 2019.

=== Servant of the People ===
Arakhamia heads the parliamentary faction of Servant of the People.

In 2021, Arakhamia proclaimed that Servant of the People shared principles with the Chinese Communist Party, also stating that Ukraine "sees China as an example and considers it a strategic partner".

During the 2022 Russian invasion of Ukraine, Arakhamia was part of a close circle of advisors who remained in the capital of Kyiv with President Volodymyr Zelenskyy. On 28 February 2022, Arakhamia was named a member of the negotiating team sent to Pripyat on the Ukraine-Belarus border for talks on a potential ceasefire. On 28 March 2022, Arakhamia said agreement was close on security guarantees and Ukraine's EU bid, but prospective guarantor countries had yet to agree to security guarantees. In April, he said Russia had agreed to almost all Ukraine's peace proposals. He added that he had the "feeling that the US and the UK will be the last to join when they see that others agree".

=== Recognition ===
In 2019, 2020, and 2021, Arakhamia was rated as one of the top 100 influential people of Ukraine according to the Novoye Vremya magazine, ranking 36th, 43rd and 37th place, respectively. In 2020, he took 21st place in the top 100 most influential Ukrainians according to the Focus magazine. In 2021, he took 6th place.

== Controversy ==
=== Reopening North Crimean Canal ===
On 11 February 2020, Arakhamia announced on Priamyi the possibility of restarting the supply of Russian-controlled Crimea through the North Crimean Canal. In response, he was widely condemned by other politicians and the Mejlis of the Crimean Tatar People, with the latter accusing him of "surrender". Arakhamia later apologised for his comments.

=== Sexism ===
In late June 2020, Arakhamia and deputy leader of Servant of the People Oleksandr Kornienko were widely accused of sexism after a hot mic recording showed them describing female People's Deputy Iryna Allakhverdiyeva in terms such as "working woman [...] like a ship pine", and, "bring someone like her to the President and you'll see... his jaw will fucking drop." Arakhamia claimed that the recording had been doctored, but Kornienko contradicted him, not only admitting that the remarks were true but stating that they had been about Tetiana Dombrovska, Servant of the People's candidate for mayor of Mykolaiv. Kornienko apologised both for himself and on behalf of Arakhamia.

== Personal life ==
Arakhamia has remarried after his first marriage. He has six children.

== Awards ==
- Order of Merit, Third Class – 2014

== See also ==
- List of members of the parliament of Ukraine, 2019–2023
