= Ruslan Riaboshapka =

Ukrainian jurist

- Руслан Рябошапка
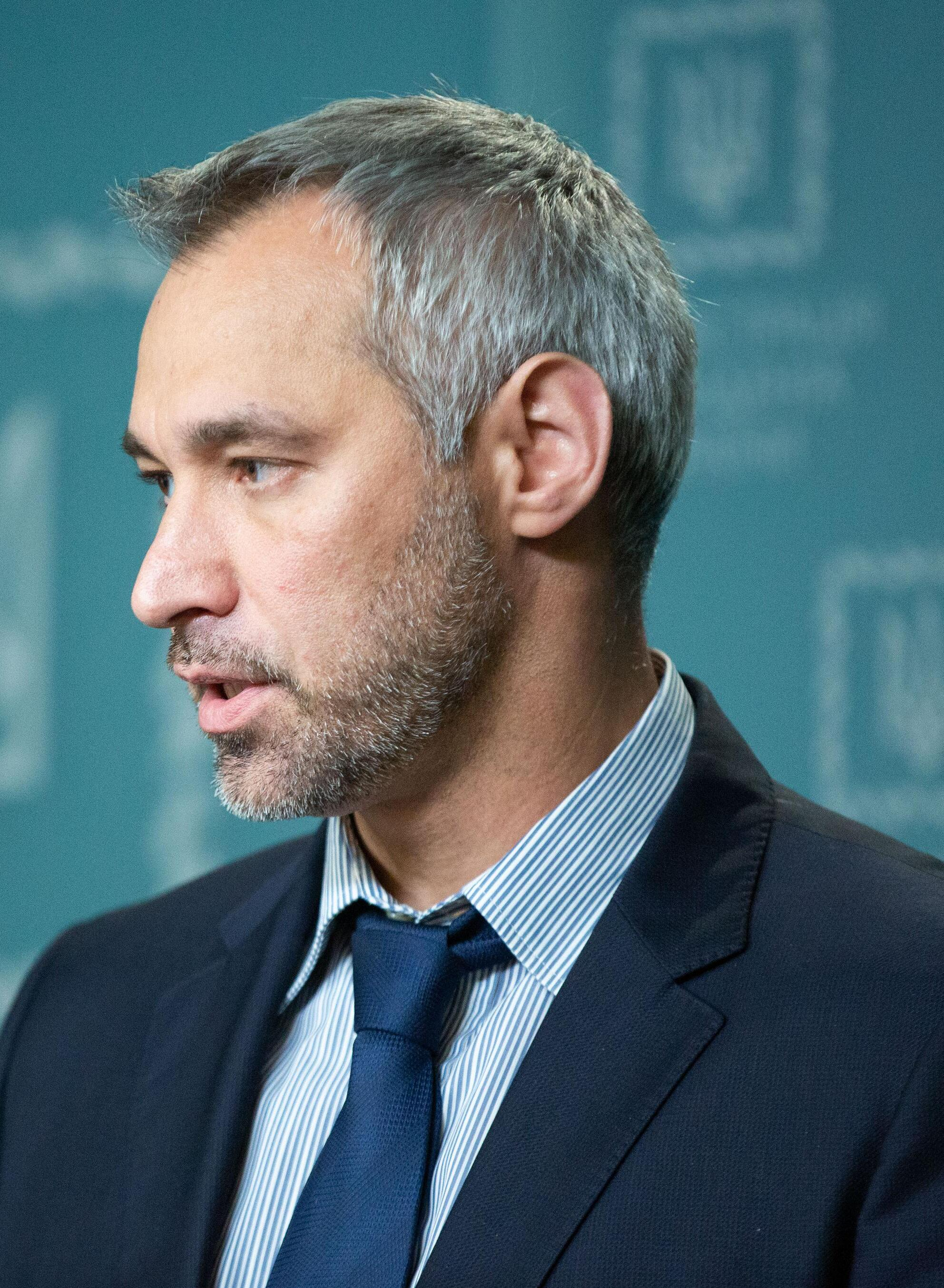
- Riaboshapka in 2019

Prosecutor General of Ukraine
- In office 29 August 2019 – 5 March 2020
- President: Volodymyr Zelenskyy
- Preceded by: Yuriy Lutsenko
- Succeeded by: Viktor Chumak (Acting); Iryna Venediktova

Personal details
- Born: Ruslan Heorhiovych Riaboshapka; 14 October 1976 (age 49) Zelenohirske, Ukrainian SSR, Soviet Union
- Party: Non-partisan
- Spouse: Olesia Bartovshchuk
- Children: 3
- Education: International Solomon University

Ruslan Heorhiiovych Riaboshapka (Ukrainian: Руслан Георгійович Рябошапка; born 14 October 1976) is a Ukrainian jurist who was the Prosecutor General of Ukraine from August 2019 to March 2020.

Before being appointed as General Prosecutor, Ruslan Riaboshapka was responsible for its legal department and relationships of the President with courts.

Riaboshapka is well known for his resignation from the National Agency for Prevention of Corruption (NAZK) back in 2017 when several members of the agency resigned during a crisis. While a member of NAZK since 2016, he called for re-launching of the agency and appointing new leadership, due to its poor task performance over checking the electronic asset declarations. Riaboshapka is one of the founders of the Center for National Sustainability and Development.

== Education ==
1998 — graduated from International Solomon University, qualified as a specialist.

== Career ==
2001–2002, was Deputy Director of the Department of Legislation on Justice, Criminal and Procedural Law and Administrative Responsibility of the Ministry of Justice of Ukraine.

2002–2003, was the director of the Center for Legal Reform and Bill Work under the Ministry of Justice of Ukraine.

2003–2010, headed the Department of Legislation on Justice, Law Enforcement and Anti-Corruption Policy of the Ministry of Justice of Ukraine.

2010, was appointed Director of the newly established Bureau for Anti-Corruption Policy of the Secretariat of the Cabinet of Ministers of Ukraine.

2011 - 2013 — Deputy Director of the Legal Support Department of the Secretariat of the Cabinet of Ministers of Ukraine.

2013–2014 Riaboshapka for about six months worked in Transparency International Ukraine and then was a deputy minister of Justice of Ukraine.

2016 - 2017 — Member of the National Agency for the Prevention of Corruption.

May – August 2019 — was a deputy chief of staff for the recently elected President of Ukraine Volodymyr Zelenskyy

2019 — was appointed Deputy Head of the Office of the President of Ukraine Volodymyr Zelenskyy.

=== Prosecutor General of Ukraine ===
Riaboshapka was appointed by the Verkhovna Rada as the General Prosecutor on 29 August 2019. On September 19, 2019, a large-scale reform of the prosecutor's office began, the first stage of which was the cleansing of the Prosecutor General's Office from dishonest and incompetent prosecutors. During the first phase, more than 55 percent of prosecutors were fired and the staff of the Prosecutor General's Office was significantly reduced.

In addition to re-certification, Riaboshapka's main achievements include: intensification of investigations into withdrawals from Privatbank; establishment of a department that collects and transmits evidence of Russia's armed aggression to international courts; starting over 3,000 criminal cases for deforestation; prosecution of the owners of 12 banks, who stole and took offshore about ₴13 billion; and the murder of Kateryna Handziuk.

On March 5, 2020, the Verkhovna Rada expressed distrust in Riaboshapka, dismissing him from the post of Prosecutor General. Riaboshapka himself called the decision "built on outright lies and manipulations", the dismissal was initiated by people's deputies, some of whom are called close to the oligarch Ihor Kolomoiskyi and representatives of the "Russian world" in the parliament.

== Family ==
Ruslan is married with Olesia Bartovshchuk. The couple has three sons who live in France.

== Awards and merits ==
- Merited Jurist of Ukraine – an official award of the Ministry of Justice of Ukraine (2010).
- International Anticorruption Champions Award (2021).
