= Kostiantyn Symonenko =

Ukrainian traveler (born 1974)

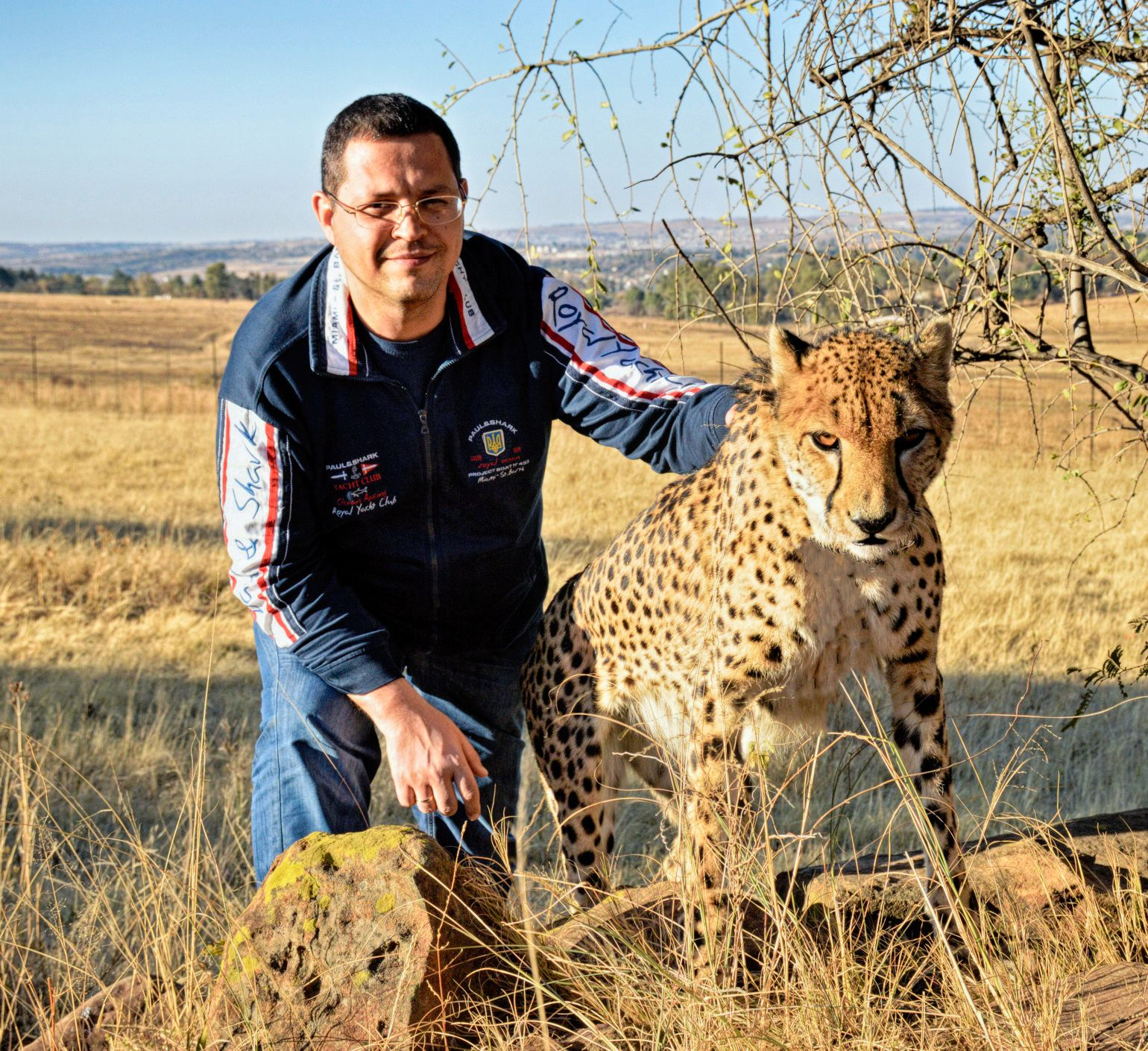
- Symonenko in 2017
- Born: Kostiantyn Valentinovych Symonenko; 25 May 1974; Odesa, Ukrainian SSR, USSR
- Known for: Traveler, lawyer, writer

Kostiantyn Symonenko (Ukrainian: Костянтин Валентинович Симоненко; born 25 May 1974, Odesa, Ukraine) is a Ukrainian traveler, lawyer and writer. He was the first Ukrainian to visit all the countries of the world.

== Biography ==
Born on 25 May 1974, in Odesa. He graduated from the Kyiv Institute of International Relations, majoring in International Economic Relations (1996) and International Law (2000).

He worked in the diplomatic service at the Embassy of Ukraine in the USA and Ukrainian state and commercial banks. Since 2010, he has been working as a lawyer and is the owner of a law firm.

== Travel and recognition ==
The first citizen of Ukraine who visited all 193 member countries of the UN. In 2018, he was entered into the National Register of Records of Ukraine and the Book of Records of Ukraine. The diploma of the record holder was presented to him on Easter Island.

Traveling through all the countries of the world took 10 years, during which Kostiantyn covered more than 2 million kilometers, making 734 air flights.

Based on the results of his travels, Konstantin wrote the book "Two million kilometers to the dream" (2022). The book was published in a print run of 10,000 in several languages.

Kostiantyn Symonenko is registered on the famous international website for travelers Nomad Mania, which maintains a register of people who have visited all countries of the world and were able to confirm this to a special commission. As of March 2024, he was ranked 125th in the international ranking of world travelers.
