= Iryna Venediktova =

Ukrainian politician (born 1978)

- Ірина Венедіктова
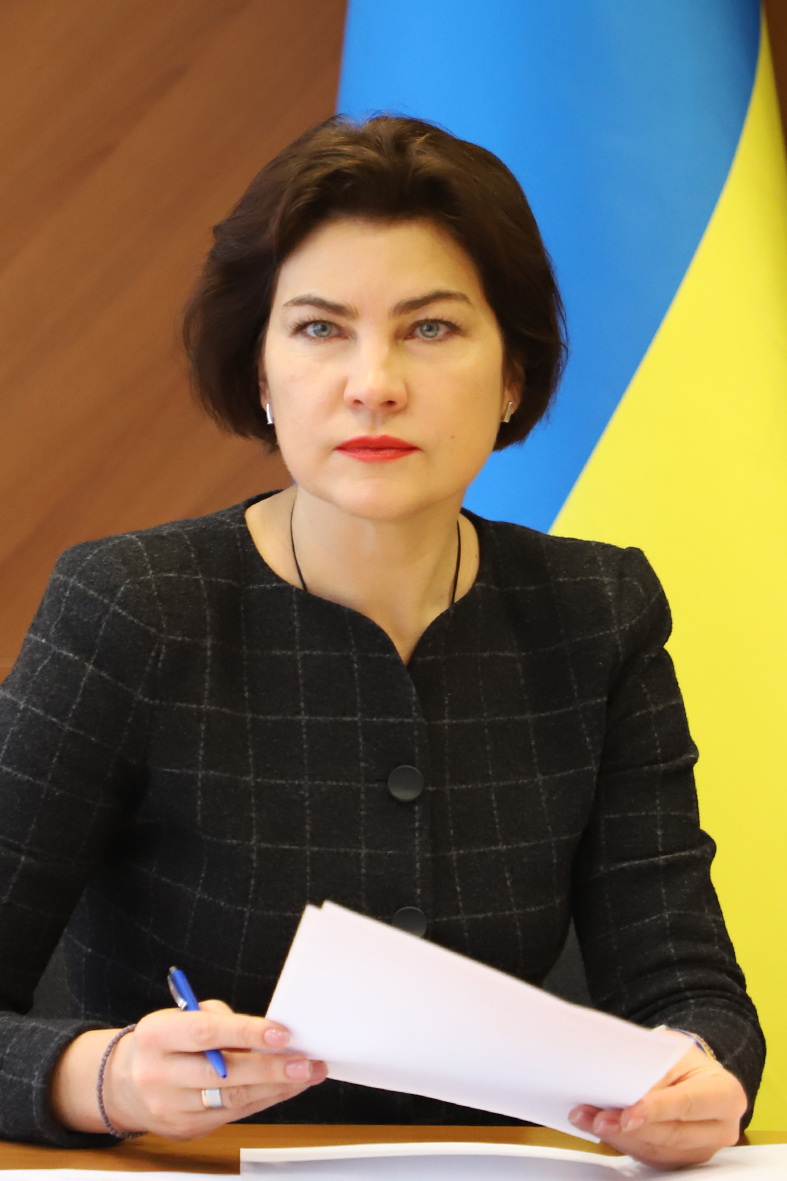
- Venediktova in 2020

Ambassador Extraordinary and Plenipotentiary of Ukraine to the Swiss Confederation and Principality of Liechtenstein
- President: Volodymyr Zelenskyy

Prosecutor General of Ukraine
- In office 17 March 2020 – 17 July 2022
- President: Volodymyr Zelenskyy
- Preceded by: Ruslan Riaboshapka
- Succeeded by: Oleksiy Symonenko (acting)

Acting Director of the State Bureau of Investigation
- In office 27 December 2019 – 17 March 2020
- Preceded by: Roman Truba
- Succeeded by: Oleksandr Sokolov (acting)

Personal details
- Born: Iryna Valentynivna Venediktova; 21 September 1978 (age 48) Kharkiv, Soviet Union
- Party: Servant of the People
- Education: Kharkiv National University of Internal Affairs; Chartered Institute of Arbitrators
- Occupation: lawyer judicial expert

Iryna Valentynivna Venediktova (Ukrainian: Ірина Валентинівна Венедіктова; born 21 September 1978) is a Ukrainian politician, diplomat, lawyer, Doctor of Juridical Science, and professor. Since November 2022, she is Ambassador Extraordinary and Plenipotentiary of Ukraine to the Swiss Confederation and the Principality of Liechtenstein. During her career she also served as the first female Prosecutor General in the history of Ukraine, and as Director of the State Bureau of Investigation ad interim. She was a Member of Parliament for the Servant of the People party of the 9th convocation, and Chairman of the Parliamentary Committee on Legal Policy.

== Biography ==
Iryna Valentynivna Venediktova was born on 21 September 1978 in Kharkiv, Ukrainian SSR in a family of lawyers. Her father, Valentyn Semenovych Venediktov, was a major general of the police, Doctor of Juridical Science, professor, an honoured lawyer, a corresponding member of the Engineering Academy, and former vice-rector of the Kharkiv National University of Internal Affairs. Her mother, Valentyna Mykhailivna Venediktova, has a PhD in Law, and worked at both the Yaroslav Mudryi National Law University and Kharkiv National University of Internal Affairs in the Faculty of Management and Informatics, specialising in "Law and Management".

She is married, and has two children.

=== Education and academic career ===
From 2000 to 2004, Venediktova worked as a lecturer in the Department of Law at the Kharkiv Humanitarian Institute of the People's Ukrainian Academy. In 2003, she defended her PhD thesis at the Yaroslav Mudryi National Law University on the topic Agreement on trust management of property as a form of implementation of the legal institution of trust management of property in Ukraine, receiving a PhD in Law.

In 2004, she became an associate professor in the Department of Justice at VN Karazin Kharkiv National University. From 2005 to 2019, she headed the Department of Civil Law at the same university. In 2013, she defended her doctoral thesis at Taras Shevchenko National University of Kyiv on the topic Protection of interests guaranteed by law in civil law. In 2014, she received the academic rank of professor in the Department of Civil Law at the VN Karazin Kharkiv National University.

Venediktova supervised one doctoral thesis and ten PhD theses in law. She is the author of more than 100 scientific and methodological publications, including eight monographs, 80 scientific publications and four scientific-methodological works.

Alongside her academic work, Venediktova held several professional and research-related positions. From 2010 to 2019, she was a member of the Foundation of Medical Law and Bioethics of Ukraine. From 2012 to 2015, she worked as a leading researcher at the Research Institute of Legal Support of Innovative Development of the National Academy of Legal Sciences of Ukraine. From 2016 to 2019, she served as an arbitrator of the International Commercial Arbitration Court at the Ukrainian Chamber of Commerce and Industry. During the same period, she was also a member of the Scientific Advisory Board at the Supreme Court of Ukraine.

== Political activity ==
In 2018, she became an advisor to Volodymyr Zelenskyy on legal issues. In the election headquarters of then-presidential candidate Zelenskyy was an expert on the reform of the judicial system.

In the parliamentary elections of 2019, she was included in the list of political party "Servant of the People" number 3 in the list.

On 21 July 2019, she was elected to the Verkhovna Rada as a Member of Parliament for the Servant of the People party of the IX convocation. On 29 August 2019, she took the oath to function as MP, ending her term on 14 January 2020.

Venediktova became the Chairman of the Parliamentary Committee on Legal Policy from 29 August 2019 to 27 December 2019. The Verkhovna Rada Committee in which she was the head of was the main committee in the adoption of the law "On Amendments to Article 80 of the Constitution of Ukraine (regarding the immunity of MPs of Ukraine)".

== Director of the State Bureau of Investigation ==
On 27 December 2019, by the Decree of the President of Ukraine (No. 961/2019), Venediktova was appointed Director of the State Bureau of Investigation (SBI) ad interim. Venediktova became the first woman in the history of Ukraine which was the head of the state law enforcement agency. In a fairly short period of leadership, until 17 March 2020, she managed to introduce a new organisational structure of the SBI.

A separate investigative unit was created in the criminal proceedings of the Maidan case. A system of monthly reports of the SBI to the public and foreign partners on the results of the law enforcement agency and separately on Maidan cases was introduced.

On 13 March 2020, Venediktova was appointed a member of the National Security and Defence Council of Ukraine.

== Prosecutor General ==
On 17 March 2020, Venediktova was appointed Prosecutor General (Decree of the President of Ukraine from 17.03.2020 No. 90/2020). Her candidacy was supported by 269 MPs. She became the first female Prosecutor General in the history of Ukraine, and was in office from 17 March 2020 to 17 July 2022.

=== Reform ===
Under the leadership of Venediktova, the reform of the prosecutor’s office was completed, as enshrined by the Law of Ukraine "On Amendments to certain Legislative Acts of Ukraine regarding priority measures for the Reform of the Prosecutor’s Office" (dated 19.09.2019). For the first time in the history the Reform provided certification of prosecutors at all three levels of the prosecutor's office. After the cleansing of the system almost 35% of prosecutors left prosecutor’s office. In September 2020, regional prosecutor’s offices were created to replace the county ones, and in March 2021 district prosecutor’s offices were created instead of local prosecutor’s offices. Within the framework of the reform, the National Academy of the Prosecutor’s Office of Ukraine was liquidated and a modern training centre for prosecutors of Ukraine was created.

The self-governing bodies of the prosecutor’s office were revived, which are the basis of the prosecutor’s independence that are: The Council of prosecutors of Ukraine and the relevant body carrying out disciplinary proceedings.

In 2021, for the first time in the history of the Ukrainian Prosecutor’s Office, the Strategy for the Development of the Prosecutor’s Office for 2021-2023 was created.

The results of the reform were highly appreciated by the G7 Ambassadors and the international community, in particular during Anti-Corruption Forum "International Forum on Kleptocracy and Illicit Financial Flows" in 2021.

=== Coordination and internal transformations of the prosecutor's office ===
As Prosecutor General, Venediktova resumed the coordinating role of the prosecutor’s office.

On 4 June 2020, for the first time in 10 years under the chairmanship of Venediktova, the coordination meeting with the heads of law enforcement agencies on prevention of torture was held at the Office of the Prosecutor General.

On 1 June 2021, for the first time in 30 years, a coordination meeting was held on crimes committed by children and against children.

Within the structure of the institution, the Department of Criminal Law Policy and Investment Protection, the specialised Environmental Prosecutor’s Office, a new specialised unit – the Department of Human Rights Protection in the Law enforcement and Penitentiary spheres were created. The specialisation of prosecutors in the field of cybersecurity, combating domestic violence, etc. has also developed.

Venediktova actively implemented digitalisation of processes: Electronic criminal proceedings, the Paperless system. On the web portal of the office started working interactive map "Statistics of criminal wrongfulness".

Particular attention was paid to working with the public sector through sectoral platforms. Also, on the initiative of the Prosecutor General, platforms for combating crimes against journalists were created – in the office of the Prosecutor General and regional prosecutor's offices separate responsible for this direction were appointed.

During the cadence of Venediktova, a museum of the prosecutor’s office and a children’s room were created within the walls of the Prosecutor General’s Office.

=== High-profile cases ===
Venediktova took personal control of high-profile criminal proceedings, which are under the close attention of the public, including the cases of journalists and activists.

On 12 February 2021, on behalf of Venediktova, prosecutors first reported case in which it was criminally charged MP of Ukraine for "button-pressing". In general, during the cadence of the Prosecutor General, criminal charges was filed to 10 MPs: cases verified from hooliganism to treason.

On 11 May 2021, Prosecutor General Venediktova criminally charged on a case of treason and violation of the laws and customs of war (attempt to loot national resources in the Ukrainian Crimea) two MPs of the Ukrainian Parliament: Viktor Medvedchuk and Taras Kozak. In June 2022, the case against Viktor Medvechuk was filed to court.

In early October 2021, Venediktova criminally charged MP of Ukraine Viktor Medvedchuk on a case of treason and facilitating to terrorist organisations, namely, by implementation of a criminal scheme for the supply of coal products from the temporarily occupied territories of Ukraine in the period late 2014 – early 2015.

Medvedchuk was criminally charged for the third time by the Prosecutor General in July 2022 for the organisation of the scheme of illegal flights between the Russian Federation and the occupied Crimea outside the Ukrainian state border crossing points. According to investigators, in 2015, the MP repeatedly flew to Russian Federation by plane, and from there to the Crimea – by helicopter.

=== Maidan cases ===
During the work of Venediktova as Prosecutor General, the results of the investigation of crimes related to mass protests in 2013-2014 improved. This process was also influenced by the adoption by the Parliament in May 2021 of the Law of Ukraine "On Amendments to the Criminal Procedural Code of Ukraine regarding the improvement of certain provisions in connection with the implementation of a special pre-trial investigation", which unblocked the usage of "in absentia" procedures in regard to fugitives.

In November 2021, an 8-year investigation into the Maidan’s "maternal case" against 10 top officials led by ex-President Yanukovych, who are suspected of organising crimes in the bloodiest days of the Revolution of Dignity, was completed.

Also, 2021 was a breakthrough in regard to verdicts in the Maidan cases. The courts have issued the same number of verdicts as in the previous 3 years combined.

=== Handziuk case ===
In 2020, the investigation was completed and the case on the assault on activist Kateryna Handziuk was filed to court. Head of the council for Kherson Oblast and assistant of deputy of this regional council were accused of organising and ordering this assault and now both have been sentenced to 10 years in prison. Also, five direct perpetrators of the assault on Kateryna and the person who committed the concealment of this crime were punished.

In general, during the investigation of the assault on Kateryna Handziuk and related crimes, 18 persons were suspected. 9 criminal proceedings were filed to the court, most of which were reviewed by the courts with convicting verdicts.

=== PrivatBank case ===
On 22 February 2021 and 15 March 2021, the Prosecutor General approved criminal charges to five former top managers of PJSC CB PrivatBank: Chairman of the Board; First Deputy Chairman of the Board; Deputy Chairman of the Board – Head of the Treasury; Head of interbank operations department and Head of financial management department on a case of embezzlement of more than 8.3 billion UA hryvnas funds of the bank.

=== International cooperation ===
In her work as Prosecutor General, Venediktova paid great attention to the development of international relations and interaction with EU institutions and law enforcement agencies in Europe and the United States.

During her work, level of international legal cooperation, as well as number of extradition and granting of a persons requested for prosecution from the competent authorities of other countries has increased.

Also during this period, the Office of the Prosecutor General conducted with law enforcement agencies of foreign states large-scale special operations to expose cyber groups. The largest is the Emotet operation against a group of hackers who, with the help of the world’s most widespread malware, caused US$2.5 billion in damages.

In November 2021, the Office of the Prosecutor General under the leadership of Venediktova in pursuance of the request for international legal assistance, for the first time, handed over to foreign colleagues – the Federal Republic of Germany, evidence in the form of movable property – rare cars of elite brands worth more than 1 million euros.

In December 2021, Venediktova made the first, since 2002, working visit of the Prosecutor General of Ukraine to the United States Department of Justice, where she discussed important issues of bilateral cooperation in the field of combating crime.

In 2021, at the initiative of the Office of the Prosecutor General under the leadership of Venediktova, the International Cyber Security Forum and the International Forum "Kleptocracy and International Financial Flows" were organised and held.

=== War Crimes ===
The Department of War of the Office of the Prosecutor General was under the direct supervision of Prosecutor General Venediktova from 30 June 2021. The International Council of experts on crimes committed throughout armed conflict was established at the Office of the Prosecutor General, which has institutionally strengthened the capacity of prosecutors.

On the initiative of Venediktova back in the summer of 2021, specialised investigative units were created for war crimes in the SBU and in the National Police.

Prosecutor General Venediktova initiated in August 2021 the beginning of declassification of the Ilovaisk case as an important element of justice of transitional period in the context of the ongoing armed conflict with the Russian Federation – the right on truth.

Venediktova also actively cooperated with the Office of the Prosecutor of the International Criminal Court. The Prosecutor General’s Office sent him regular information reports on the crimes of the Russian Federation in the Crimea and in the Donbas. Thanks to these materials, at the end of 2020, the ICC Prosecutor decided to finish the preliminary study in the case "situation in Ukraine" and stated the existence of grounds for starting a full-fledged investigation.

== Criminal investigation of the Russian Federation ==
During her time at the prosecutor's office, Venediktova created a multi-level system for investigating crimes of the Russian Federation and introduced the "standard of documentation" of the most high-profile crimes with the involvement of military and technical advisers and international experts. The large-scale leadership vision of Venediktova and active work on the international track allowed to unite the world legal community. 18 countries have initiated their own national investigations related to the events in Ukraine.

Venediktova initiated the creation, at the Office of the Prosecutor General, of the Task Force interdepartmental working group to find, arrest and confiscate the assets of persons involved in the Russian aggression and war crimes and related persons for the future subsequent seizure for rebuilding of Ukraine and for Ukrainians affected by actions of such persons. The Ukrainian Task Force has established cooperation regarding the operational exchange of information with the Task Force Klepto Capture Department of Justice USA and the European Commission "Freeze and Seize" Task Force.

=== National level ===
During the work of the Venediktova law enforcement system of Ukraine has identified 624 suspects in the "magisterial case" of Russian aggression – these are top officials, generals, and propaganda agents of the Russian Federation. 127 suspects in war crimes were identified. Cases against 10 of them were filed to the court, and on 6 cases there were convictional verdicts by the courts.

A single evidence hub was created – warcrimes.gov.ua, where witnesses and victims can provide data on Russian war crimes in Ukraine.

Prosecutors and investigators began investigating the crime of the Russian Federation genocide against the Ukrainian people and prosecuted three Russian propagandists for calls to genocide.

=== Cooperation with Prosecutor’s Office of the International Criminal Court ===
On 2 March 2022, the Prosecutor of the International Criminal Court, Karim Khan, officially launched an investigation into crimes against humanity and war crimes committed during the international armed conflict in Ukraine, in accordance with Article 53 (1) of the Rome Statute of the International Criminal Court. Prosecutor General Venediktova established a permanent dialogue with Prosecutor Khan for interaction and assistance between the parties. They held three meetings with the ICC Prosecutor directly in Ukraine, in particular at the scene of war crimes in Kyiv and Kharkiv. Also, the parties reached an agreement on the arrangement of the field office of the Office of the Prosecutor of the ICC in Kyiv.

=== Joint Investigation Team ===
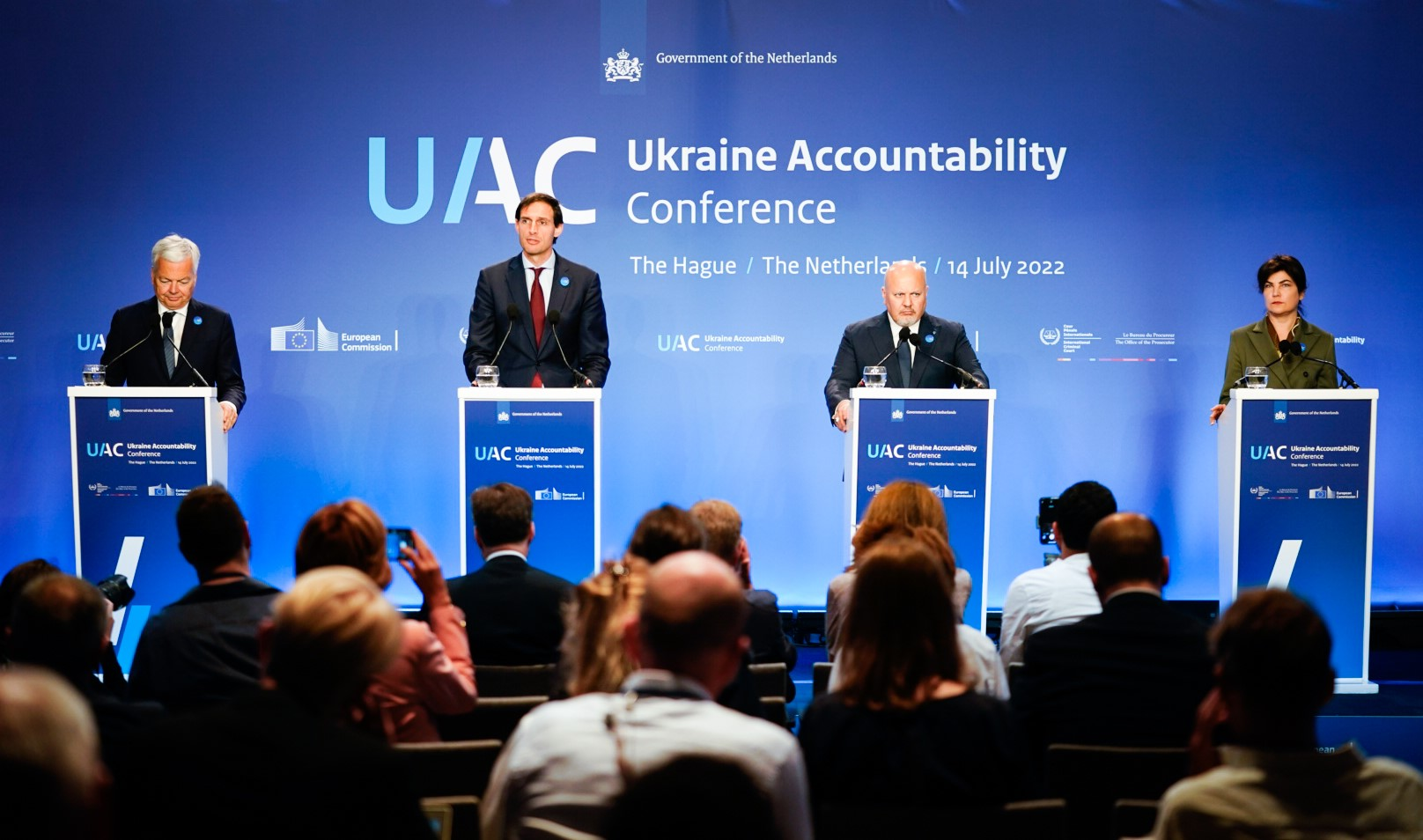
European Commissioner for Justice Didier Reynders, Dutch Foreign Minister Wopke Hoekstra, ICC Prosecutor Karim Khan, and Ukraine's Prosecutor General Venediktova in The Hague, Netherlands, 22 July 2022

On 25 March 2022, at the borders crossing point Krakovets on the border of Ukraine and Poland, Prosecutor General Venediktova signed an agreement on the establishment of a Joint investigation team (JIT) with the Prosecutor General of the Republic of Lithuania and the Republic of Poland to ensure a coordinated investigation into the crime of aggression, violation of laws and customs of war and committing other war crimes by Russian Federation. Subsequently, for the first time in its history, the Office of the Prosecutor of the ICC became a member of the JIT. Later, Estonia, Latvia and Slovakia joined the JIT. It is the largest JIT in history of Eurojust, based on which it was created.

=== International legal front ===
The United States, the EU and the United Kingdom have created an advisory group for the Ukrainian Office of the Prosecutor General on atrocity crimes; the Atrocity Crimes Advisory Group. After fruitful negotiations between Prosecutor General Venediktova and well-known British lawyer Amal Clooney in the United Kingdom, the Legal task Force was established, which helps Ukrainian law enforcement officers in matters of international law and asset confiscation.

In July 2022, Prosecutor General Venediktova presented Ukraine at the Ukraine Accountability Conference in the Hague. As a result of the event, 45 countries of the world signed a declaration on the establishment of a Dialog Group to unite world initiatives.

As of July 2022, Venediktova signed more than 10 bilateral documents with prosecutors and law enforcement agencies of the countries of the world on cooperation on crimes that are cause for concern to the entire international community. Also, in March 2022, the Prosecutor General of Ukraine signed a Working agreement with Laura Kövesi on behalf of EU Prosecutor’s Office. Ukraine became the first country to have such an agreement with the European Prosecutor’s Office.

The mission of experts from France, experts from Slovakia, Lithuania and Poland were involved in the work at the scene of war crimes.

== Diplomatic activity ==
On 17 November 2022, by the Decree of the President Zelenskyy (No. 786/2022) Venediktova was appointed Ambassador Extraordinary and Plenipotentiary of Ukraine to the Swiss Confederation.

On 19 December 2022, she handed copies of letters of credence to the Federal Ministry of Foreign Affairs of Switzerland. 10 January 2023 – handed over letters of credence to the President of the Swiss Confederation, Alain Berset.

Since 28 April 2023, concurrently she became Ambassador Extraordinary and Plenipotentiary of Ukraine to the Principality of Liechtenstein.

As part of her diplomatic mission, Venediktova is systematically engaged in the development of Ukrainian-Swiss relations at the highest level. In particular, the official meetings of President Zelenskyy with the Presidents of Switzerland, Alain Berset (in 2023) and Viola Amherd (in 2024), were organised as part of bilateral visits and at events at international venues.

Thanks to the strengthening of inter-parliamentary ties between Ukraine and Switzerland, the Chairman of the Verkhovna Rada, Ruslan Stefanchuk, visited Switzerland regarding cooperation and support of Ukraine in the context of Russian aggression. The ambassador also facilitated the hosting of the 4th Ukrainian Forum in the Parliament of Switzerland, where the important issues of strengthening sanctions against Russia and humanitarian aid to Ukraine were considered.

Switzerland publicly supported the Peace Formula of President Zelenskyy and took an active part in its implementation by hosting the Global Peace Summit in June 2024, which brought together representatives of more than 100 states and international organisations.

Thanks to the efforts of the Ukrainian ambassador, in January 2024, the Swiss government adopted a new Foreign Policy Strategy for 2024-2027, where Ukraine is designated as a priority country for the first time.

Since the beginning of Venediktova's work, Switzerland has repeatedly adopted decisions on financial assistance to Ukraine. Moreover, in April 2024, the Swiss government decided to allocate 5 billion Swiss francs to support the reconstruction of Ukraine till 2036.

Venediktova, in cooperation with Switzerland and Liechtenstein, is actively working to increase pressure of sanctions on Russia. Assets worth more than 14 billion Swiss francs were frozen, that includes seized real estate, vehicles and other assets.

Thanks to the efforts of the Ukrainian embassy, Switzerland currently plays a leading role in assisting Ukraine in humanitarian demining. In September 2023, the Swiss Federal Council decided to allocate 100 million Swiss francs for this purpose. During 2022-2023, Bern has already allocated 15.2 million Swiss francs as an aid for humanitarian demining.

As Ambassador to the Principality of Liechtenstein, Venediktova contributed to the appointment, as the Honorary Consul of Ukraine in Liechtenstein, of David Karl Yandrasits, and on 27 June 2024, opened the Honorary Consulate of Ukraine in the city of Vaduz.
