= Oleksiy Symonenko =

Ukrainian lawyer and intelligence officer

- Олексій Симоненко

Acting Prosecutor General of Ukraine
- In office 17 July 2022 – 28 July 2022
- President: Volodymyr Zelenskyy
- Preceded by: Iryna Venediktova
- Succeeded by: Andriy Kostin

Deputy Prosecutor General of Ukraine
- In office 27 March 2020 – 24 January 2023

Personal details
- Born: Oleksiy Yuriyovych Symonenko; 18 September 1976 (age 49) Chuhuiv, Ukrainian SSR, Soviet Union
- Education: Yaroslav Mudryi National Law University
- Occupation: jurisprudence
- Profession: lawyer, prosecutor

Military service
- Branch/service: Security Service of Ukraine
- Rank: Colonel of Justice

Oleksiy Yuriyovych Symonenko (Ukrainian: Олексій Юрійович Симоненко; born 18 September 1976) is a Ukrainian lawyer and former investigator.

Symonenko was an officer in the Security Service of Ukraine (SBU) from 2010 to 2019. During this time his investigative team laid criminal charges against former Ukrainian prime ministers Yulia Tymoshenko and Pavlo Lazarenko. Symonenko was deputy Prosecutor General of Ukraine from 27 March 2020 to 17 July 2022. In December 2020, Symonenko transferred a case of bribery charges against Oleh Tatarov, deputy chief of staff of president Volodymyr Zelenskyy, from the National Anti-Corruption Bureau of Ukraine (NABU) to the SBU and supervised the case. Symonenko and nine other legal officers participating in the Tatarov case attended Tatarov's birthday party in September 2021. The case was closed in December 2021.

Symonenko was appointed acting Prosecutor General of Ukraine on 17 July 2022 until Andriy Kostin became Prosecutor General of Ukraine on 28 July 2022. Symonenko then reverted to his position as Deputy Prosecutor General until he resigned following a scandal in January 2023.

== Youth and education ==
Oleksiy Yuriyovych Symonenko was born in Chuhuiv in the Kharkiv Oblast in 1976. He studied law at Yaroslav Mudryi National Law University, graduating and qualifying as a lawyer in 1998.

== Investigator in prosecutor's offices ==
From 1998 to 2010, Symonenko worked in Prosecutor's offices in Obolonskyi District and other parts of Kyiv, gaining in seniority as an investigator. He reached leadership positions in criminal investigation departments by 2010.

== Security Service ==
From 2010 to 2019, Symonenko was an officer in the Security Service of Ukraine (SBU). In 2012, Symonenko's investigative team charged former Ukrainian prime ministers Yulia Tymoshenko and Pavlo Lazarenko in a criminal case related to United Energy Systems of Ukraine (UESU). In 2018, investigator Sergii Gorbatuk prepared charges against four judges for embezzlement in relation to having fabricated the UESU case. The charges were not authorised and in 2019 Gorbatuk was fired. Gorbatuk said that Symonenko had been "investigated for his possible role in fabricating" the original UESU case.

Symonenko was given a military rank and three medals during his time at SBU. He resigned from the SBU in March 2019.

== Prosecutor General's Office ==
=== Deputy Prosecutor General ===
On 27 March 2020, Symonenko was appointed deputy Prosecutor General of Ukraine, after having been unsuccessful in a competition for the position of deputy director of the State Bureau of Investigations of Ukraine.

On 24 December 2020, Symonenko transferred a case of bribery charges against Oleh Tatarov, deputy chief of staff of president Volodymyr Zelenskyy, from the National Anti-Corruption Bureau of Ukraine (NABU) to the SBU. Symonenko stated that the transfer had been ordered by judge Serhiy Vovk from a court in Pechersk, Kyiv. NABU considered the transfer of the case to be illegal. Later that month, prosecutors under Symonenko's supervision refused to arrest Tatarov, arguing that the grounds were insufficient, while NABU disagreed, stating that the evidence was enough to lay charges. In February 2021, prosecutors under Symonenko's supervision missed a deadline for sending Tatarov's case to trial.

In September 2021, Symonenko and nine other law enforcement officers involved in the investigation of Tatarov attended Tatarov's birthday party, according to Ukrainska Pravda. The Anti-Corruption Action Center interpreted the Ukrainska Pravda investigation to show "absolutely obvious" links between Symonenko and Tatarov. In December 2021, a court ordered the Tatarov case to be closed.

Symonenko led an investigation into the 20 July 2016 murder of journalist Pavel Shermet, which, as of 23 July 2022, was inconclusive. He also led the investigation into the murder of Kateryna Handziuk.

Symonenko headed a criminal case against activist Serhii Sternenko.

Symonenko signed the December 2021 treason charges against Petro Poroshenko, former Ukrainian president, during a leave of absence of Iryna Venediktova, Prosecutor General.

=== Acting Prosecutor General and return to previous position ===
On 17 July 2022, Symonenko was appointed acting Prosecutor General of Ukraine.

Symonenko reverted to his position as deputy prosecutor general when Andriy Kostin became Prosecutor General of Ukraine on 28 July 2022.

Symonenko resigned from this position on 24 January 2023, after a scandal involving another businessman, Hryhoriy Kozlovskyi, and a vacation trip to Spain in December-January, which subsequently led the National Security and Defense Council banning state officials from leaving Ukraine in late January 2023, except for business trips.
