= Andrii Levus =

Ukrainian politician

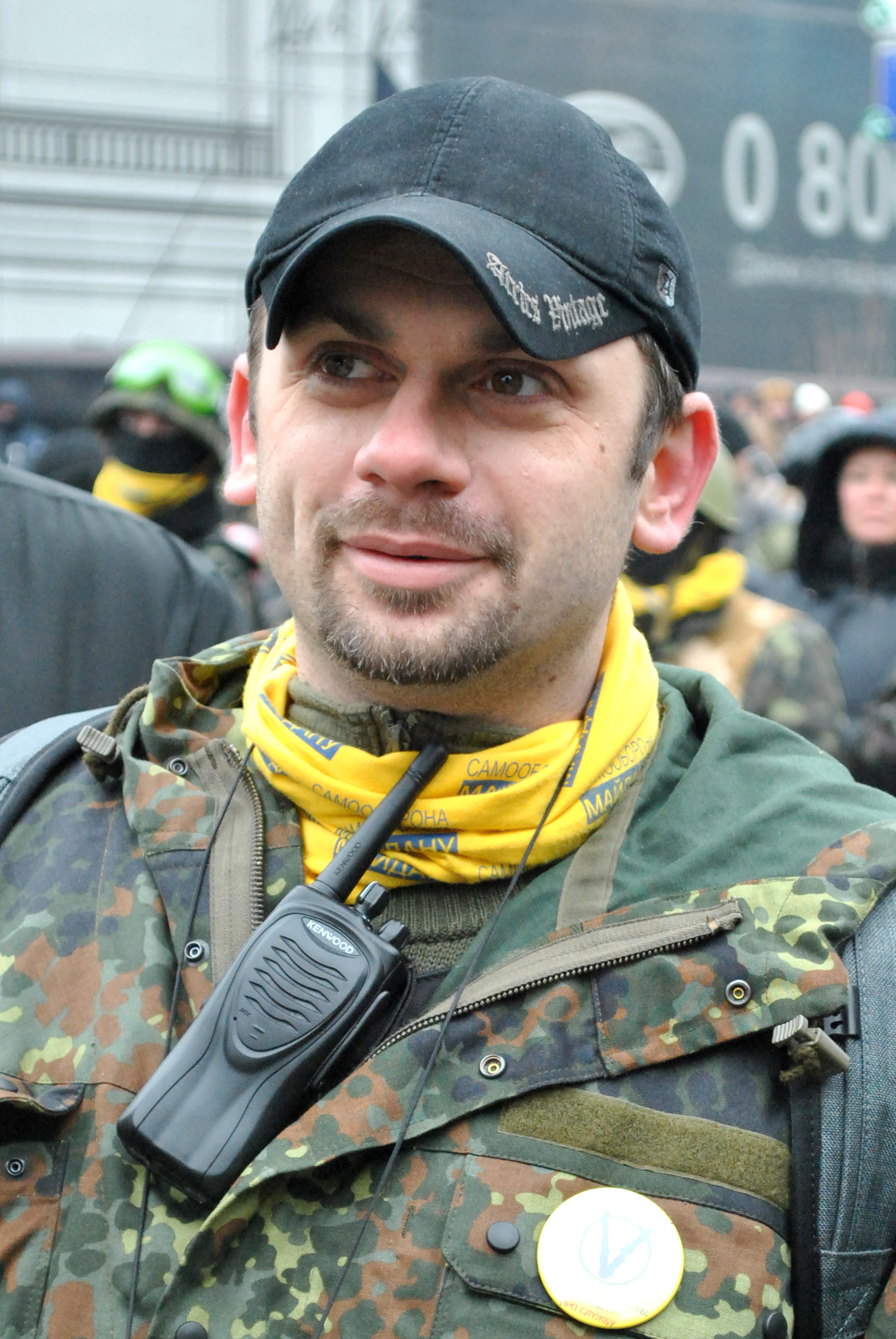
Levus in 2014

Andrii Marianovych Levus (Ukrainian: Андрій Мар'янович Левус; born August 9, 1979, Stryi, Lviv Oblast) is a public and political figure, head of the Maidan Self-Defense Command (2013–2014), and deputy head of the SBU (February 26 – November 24, 2014). People's Deputy of Ukraine of the VIII convocation, where he was the chairman of the subcommittee on state security of the Verkhovna Rada Committee on National Security and Defense. Chairman of the Board of the public organization "Free People".

== Education ==
He graduated from Stryi Secondary School No 3. Then he graduated from the Faculty of History of Ivan Franko Lviv University at 2002.

== Career ==
Since 2002 he has worked as a history and law teacher at the high school where he studied before.

During the 2004 presidential election, he headed Viktor Yushchenko's headquarters in his homeland. He headed the local headquarters of the "Our Ukraine" party.

He later worked for a local newspaper. He headed the Ukrainian Information Service (press service of the Ukrainian World Congress).

In 2007–2012, he was an assistant to the People's Deputy of Ukraine Andriy Parubiy.

In 2012, he took an active part in the parliamentary election campaign in the Ternopil Oblast, in the Zboriv Raion. He headed the headquarters of the candidate Valentyn Nalyvaichenko.

In 2013–2014 he was an active participant in protests, head of the Maidan Self-Defense Commandant's Office.

In February 2014, he was appointed Deputy Chairman of the Security Service of Ukraine Valentyn Nalyvaichenko. He was involved in personnel changes, assistance to anti-terrorist operation participants, and the release of hostages. He was responsible for the Department of Information Security, the Department of Information and Analytical Support. On November 24, Levus was dismissed by President Petro Poroshenko.

== Deputy activity ==
From autumn 2014 to August 29, 2019 – People's Deputy of the 8th convocation from the "Popular Front party". Member of the Popular Front faction, chairman of the subcommittee on state security of the Committee on National Security and Defense.

He was a member of the inter-factional anti-occupation association "Offensive". According to Levus, the main task of this association is to cleanse the "Russian world".

He is the author of a number of bills on the imposition of sanctions against persons who threaten the national security of Ukraine; on restricting the use of media products of the Russian Federation and the state language; on measures to protect national interests, national security, sovereignty and territorial integrity of Ukraine, countering terrorist activities; on defense capability and reserve army; on the special status of the UOC(MP) and a number of others.

== Persecution in Russia ==
The Investigative Committee of the Russian Federation has opened a criminal case against Levus and other deputies, Yuri Bereza and Igor Mosiychuk, who commented on the events in Grozny on December 4, 2014, when a group of Chechens attacked a traffic police post and then hid in the Press House. According to the agency's website, "Bereza, Levus and Mosiychuk made statements justifying the crimes committed on December 4, 2014 in the city of Grozny, and with the help of the media called for similar crimes in Russia."
