= State Bureau of Investigation (Ukraine) =

Law enforcement agency of Ukraine

- Державне Бюро Розслідувань

Agency overview
- Formed: 29 February 2016; 10 years ago
- Jurisdiction: Ukraine
- Headquarters: Kyiv
- Motto: Fiat iustitia, et pereat mundus (Latin for "Let justice be done, though the world perish")
- Agency executive: Oleksii Sukhachov, Director
- Website: https://dbr.gov.ua/en/

The State Bureau of Investigation (Ukrainian: Державне Бюро Розслідувань, romanized: Derzhavne Biuro Rozsliduvan') is a law enforcement agency of Ukraine that investigates criminal proceedings involving law enforcement officers, judges, and high-ranking officials. It is commonly known in Ukraine as DBR (ДБР) or anglicized as SBI. Gradually, the DBR took over the function of preparatory proceedings from the prosecutor's office.

== History ==
The State Bureau of Investigation was established by the law signed by the President of Ukraine on 14 January 2016, and resolution of the CabMin no. 127.

On 10 April 2020 Ukraine's State Bureau of Investigations handed a murder suspicion notice to a former People's Deputy of Ukraine Tetiana Chornovol. Chornovol is accused of "controlling actions of a group of people and directly participating in the arson" of the Party of Regions office building.

On 4 October 2024, the SBI arrested two officials from the Khmelnytskyi Oblast. The two officials worked for the Ukraine's Pension Fund. They are accused of illegally registering men with "non-existent diagnoses" to help them avoid being conscripted. The SBI's search found some $5.2 million USD, Hr 5 million, 300,00 euros, jewellery, 9 cars and ownership of some 30 properties in Ukraine, Turkey, Spain and Austria.

== See also ==
- National Anti-Corruption Bureau of Ukraine
