= Renewable energy in Ukraine =

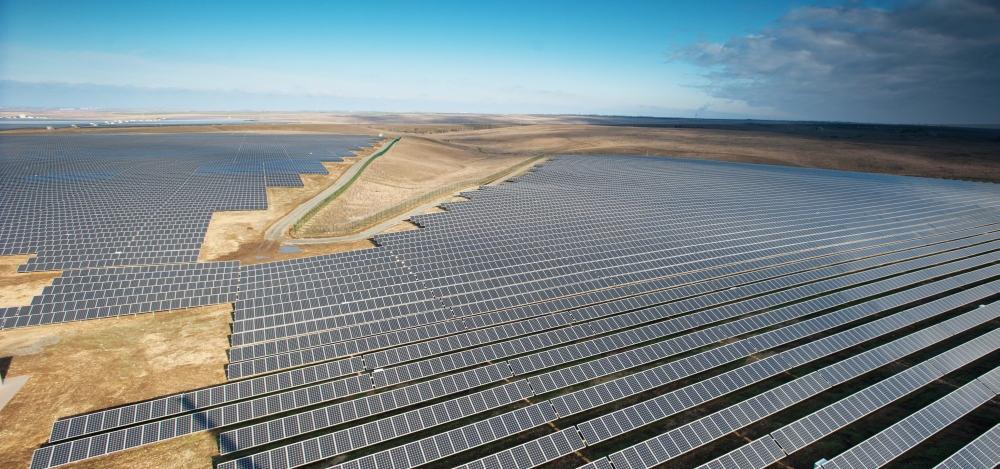
Perovo Solar Park

Less than 10% of energy in Ukraine is renewables. (Note: excluding traditional biomass such as wood) Biomass provides renewable heat. There is a National Renewable Energy Action Plan to 2030.

Decentralized electricity generation, such as rooftop solar, improves energy security.

== Progress towards targets ==
Renewable energy Progress Report Ukraine, 2014-2020.
	2014	2015	2016	2017	2018	2019	2020
Renewable energy share of heating and cooling sector			6,20%	7,56%	8%	9,03%	9,28%
Renewable energy share of electricity sector			7,91%	8,64%	8,9%	10,89%	13,92%
Renewable energy share of transport sector			2,10%	2,44%	2,2%	3,07%	2,47%
Renewable energy share of total energy consumption	3,9%	4,9%	5,85%	6,67%	7%	8,08%	9,19%

Renewable energy use in Ukraine started from a relatively low base in 2016, but until the 2022 invasion its use was growing in all sectors. Overall in 2017 Ukraine 6.67% of total energy consumption in the country was provided by renewable energy sources. This broke down into 7.56% in the heating and cooling sector, 8.64% in the electricity sector and 2.44% in the transport sector. Renewable energy use grew particularly strongly in the electricity sector from 2018 to 2021 with a large rise in solar power installations as well as smaller rises in wind power and other sources.

== History ==
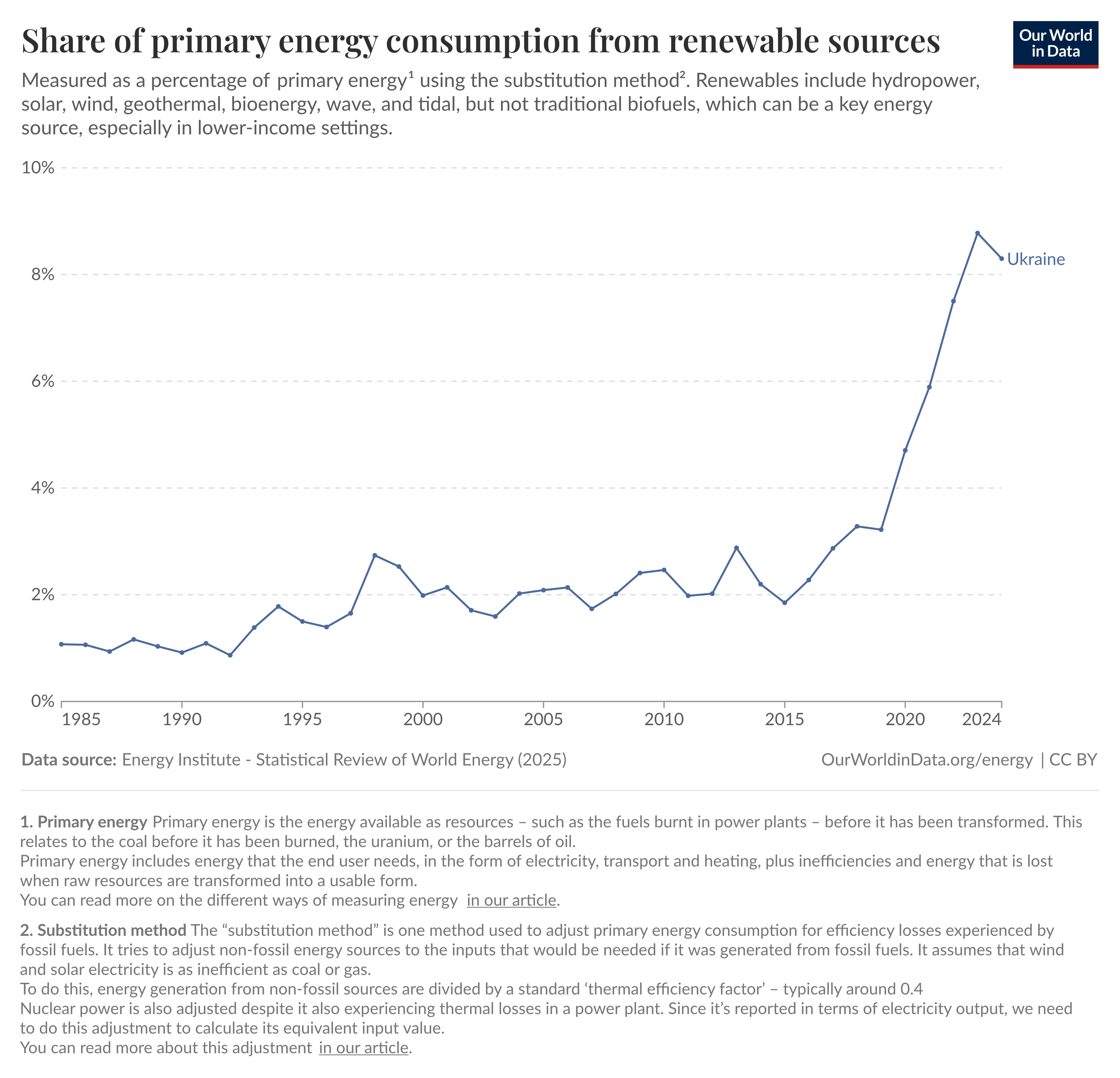
Renewables share (excluding traditional biomass)

Renewable energy capacities (MWp)
	2010	2011	2012	2013	2014	2015	2016	2017	2018	2019	2020	2021
Wind	87	151	194	334	426/651,8	426	438	465	533	1,170	1,314	1,673
Solar	3	191	326	616	411/818,9	432	531	742	1,388	4,925	6,094	6,227
households SPP	-	-	-	-	0,1	2	17	51	157	553	779	1,205
Small hydropower plants of Ukraine			73	75	80	87	90	95	99	114	116	121
Biomass			6	17	35	35	39	39	52	55.9	91	152
Biogas			0	7	14	17	20	34	46	70.3	103	124
Annual increase in new capacities				537	281	32	136	291	848	4,505	1,577	1,005
Total cumulative Installed capacity				1,181	967	999	1,135	1,426	2,275	6,939	8,516	9,521
Percentage of generation									1.7%	3.7%		
Hydropower	5,400,2	5,400,2	5,400,2	5,724,2	5,724,2	6,048,2	6,048,2	6,048,2	6,048,2	6,048,2	6,048,2	6,523.2

- 87,8 MWp WPP, 407,9 MWp SPP - is in the occupied territory of the Crimea 138 MWp WPP in occupied part of Donbas. In total, 633.7 MW of green energy capacities are occupied by Russia.

At the end of the first half of 2014, the total electrical capacity of renewable energy facilities operating in the green tariff in Ukraine amounted to 1419 MW, of which the total capacity of wind farms is 497 MW, solar power stations - 819 MW, small hydropower plants - 77 MW, of electricity generation from biomass and biogas - 26 MW. Installed capacity of facilities producing thermal energy from renewable energy sources exceeded 1070 MW.

In 2017, the total capacity of renewable energy facilities increased by more than 10% - up to 1.5 GW. For the whole of 2017, the growth of the "green" generation was 260 MW. Climate News Network reported in 2017 that Chinese companies plan to spend $1bn in a solar power park in the nuclear disaster area in Ukraine.

According to NKREKP, for the 9 months of 2018, an additional 430 MW of power plant production of electricity from solar energy, wind, biomass, and small hydroelectric power plants were introduced. 83% of growth is SPP, 13% - WPP, 4% - biomass power plants. The share of renewable energy in the total electricity generation in Ukraine is 1.8%, and the share in value is 8.3%. In 2018, the accelerated development of Ukrainian "green" energy was recorded. Thus, during the year, 813 MW of new capacities generating power from renewable sources were installed. This is almost 3 times more than the volume of capacity introduced in 2017, namely, about 300 MW.

In particular, in 2018, the following additional capacities were introduced:

- 646 MW solar power plants (SPP);
- 70 MW SPP of private households (for 9 months);
- 68 MW of wind power plants;
- 13 MW biomass electricity generation plants;
- 12 MW of electricity generating from biogas;
- 4 MW of small hydropower plants.

Over 730 million euros were invested in the installation of 813 MW of renewable energy facilities.

Overall, by the beginning of 2019, Ukraine had 2,240 MW of power generating "clean" electricity, which was 1.5 times more than at the end of 2017 (about 1500 MW).

=== 2019 ===
In the first quarter of 2019, power plants producing electricity from renewable sources, with a total capacity of 862 MW, were commissioned in Ukraine, more than the whole of 2018. The highest number of new solar power installations ever were recorded for the first quarter - 648 MW. Wind power plants expanded by 173 MW. The rest of the "green" power plants put into operation included biogas and small hydroelectric power stations.

installations in the 1st quarter:

- 684 MW of SPP;
- 173 MW of WPP;
- 5 MW biogas plants;
- 0.1 MW of small hydropower plants.

The Energy Efficiency Fund has estimated that since the beginning of the year, 730 million euro of investment has been received by Ukraine's alternative energy sector. At the same time, in 2019, an alternative source energy sector in Ukraine plans to attract 4 billion euros of investment. In the second quarter of 2019 six times more power plants that produce energy from renewable energy sources than in the same period in 2018, were commissioned in Ukraine. Generally, in April–June period in Ukraine were commissioned "green" power plants with a total capacity of 656 MW. The most active was introduction of solar power plants as 568.3 MW. Wind power plants were introduced at 71 MW. In addition, in the second quarter there are 16 MW of biogas power plants.

installations in the 2nd quarter:

- 568.3 MW of SPP;
- 71 MW of WPP;
- 16 MW biogas plants;
- 0.8 MW of small hydropower plants.

The regional leader in the number of commissioned capacities was Zaporizhia Oblast (152 MW) followed by: Mykolaiv (132 MW), Kyiv (76.3 MW), Dnipro (49.1 MW), Vinnytsia (40.2 MW) and other Oblasts. In the first quarter of this year, objects of alternative energy produced 1.9 billion kWh of electricity. Dnipro, Ternopil and Kyiv oblasts (including Kyiv) account for more than a third of all households using solar energy.

During Q3, 955.5 MW of new generating capacity was introduced, of which 97.8% was wind and solar. Most of the facilities were built in the Dnipro region - 388.5 MW. It is followed by Zaporizhzhia region - 166.9 MW, and Mykolaiv region - 144.2 MW.

installations in the 3rd quarter:

- 780.5 MW of SPP;
- 154.8 MW of WPP;
- 3.3 MW biogas plants;
- 3.9 MW biomass plants;
- 11.7 MW of small hydropower plants.

About 3,000 households installed solar panels with a total capacity of nearly 70 MW in Q3 2019. These SPP projects are being implemented nationwide. The total number increased to 14790 stations and capacity increased to 345 MW by 69 MW. TOP-3 areas with the highest number of households SPP are:

- 1982 (≈ 50 MW) - Dnipro;
- 1369 (≈ 37 MW) - Ternopil;
- 1345 (≈ 27 MW) - Kyiv.

=== 2025 ===
During 2025, 324 MW of new wind power capacity was built in Ukraine, while in the two previous years — between 2022 and the first quarter of 2025 — 248 MW of new wind power plants were commissioned. New wind power projects with a total capacity of 4.5 GW are also being implemented in Ukraine, of which 44% are located in the west of the country, 34% in the central regions and the remaining 22% in the south of Ukraine, primarily in Odessa and Mykolaiv regions. According to the association, the total capacity of wind power plants installed in Ukraine is currently 2.3 GW, of which 1.3 GW is located in the temporarily occupied territory. Ukraine also has 534 MW of total installed capacity of energy storage systems (BESS).

== «30 GW to 2030» Ukraine reconstruction project ==
In 2022, at the World Economic Forum in Davos DTEK CEO Maxim Timchenko presented a project to increase the capacity of renewable energy in Ukraine from 9 to 30 GW by 2030, as a significant part of Ukraine's post-war rebuilding plan. The project involves private investments of EUR 35-40 billion.

== Hydroelectricity ==
Hydropower is part of renewable energy in Ukraine. Ukraine is trying to build more small hydroelectric plants as sources of electricity in Ukraine. State operating company is Ukrhydroenergo. About half of hydro capacity of power stations in Ukraine has been destroyed in the Russian invasion of Ukraine, including the Kakhovka Hydroelectric Power Plant. Defence against drones is important. Design of main power plants is carried out by Ukrhydroproject.

== Solar energy ==
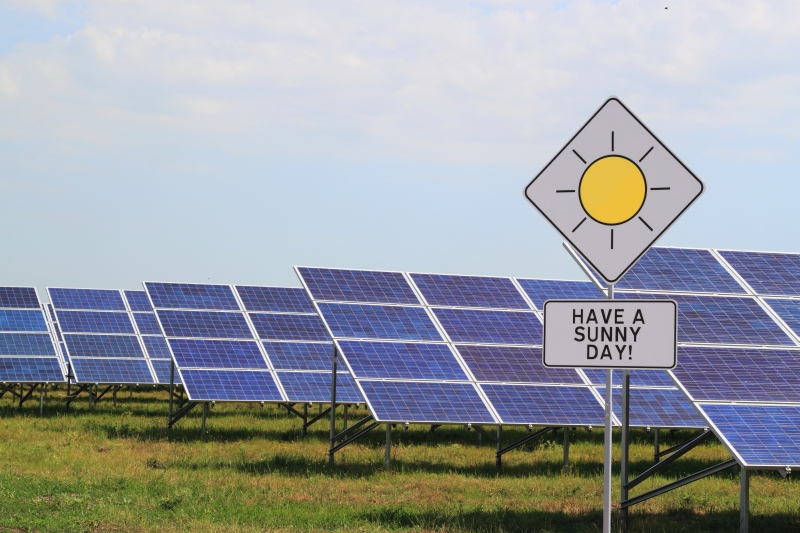
Dunayska solar station in 2013

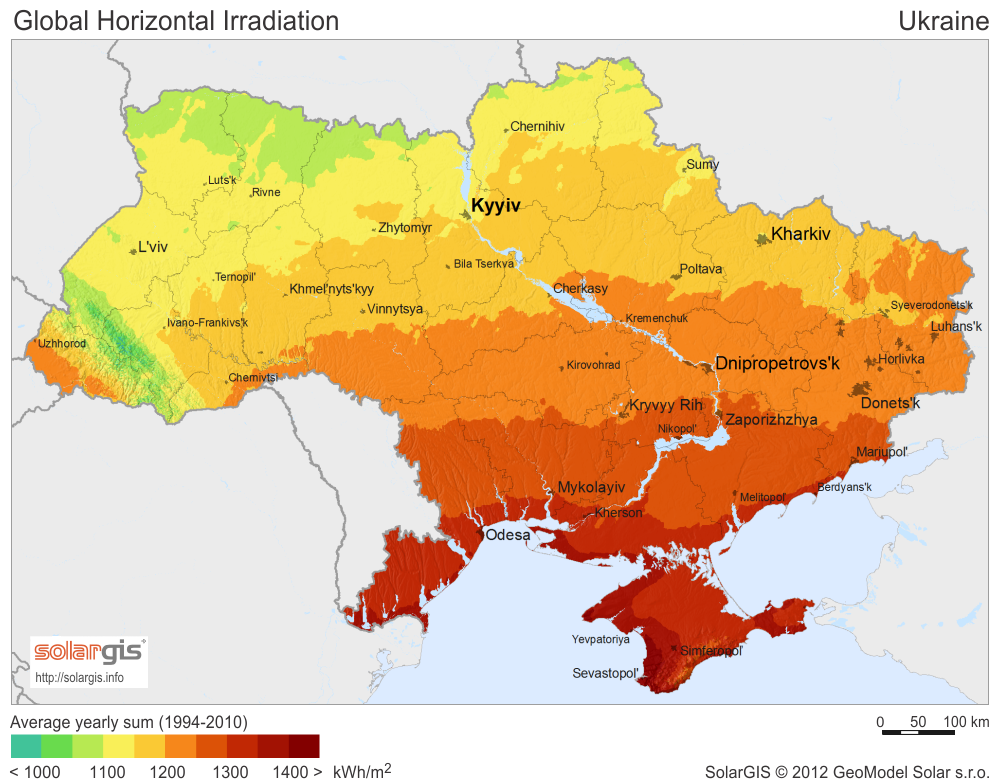
Solar potential in Ukraine

More distributed solar power in Ukraine is urgently needed to secure electricity in Ukraine, according to the IEA.

During the 2022 Russian invasion of Ukraine, the Merefa solar energy plant in the Kharkiv region was destroyed by Russia; damage was also reported at the Tokmak solar energy plant in the Zaporizhia region. Solar and wind power in Ukraine could be greatly expanded to meet much of the country’s electricity demand.

== Wind power ==
Wind power in Ukraine is mostly in areas affected by the Russo-Ukrainian War. At the end of 2021 there was 1.7 gigawatts (GW) capacity of electricity in Ukraine was wind power. In 2024 the IEA suggested installing 11 GW more by 2030.

== Bioenergy ==
In 2021 biomass such as woodchips provided 9 percent of Ukraine’s heat production, for example for heating public buildings.

== Geothermal power ==
Geothermal energy in Ukraine is mostly heat, but electricity generation has substantial potential for further development. There is about 7 MWt of geothermal heating of communal buildings and baths in Ukraine with this continuing in an upward trend following a lack of reported geothermal data from 2005–2020. Commercial use of heat pumps as well as balneological purposes can be directly linked to the growth of this number. As of 2023 there is no geothermal electricity generation in Ukraine. Despite this, there has been initiative to examine the prospective capabilities of this region and results have demonstrated that there are locations proven to be adequate for further development.
