= DTEK =

Ukrainian energy company

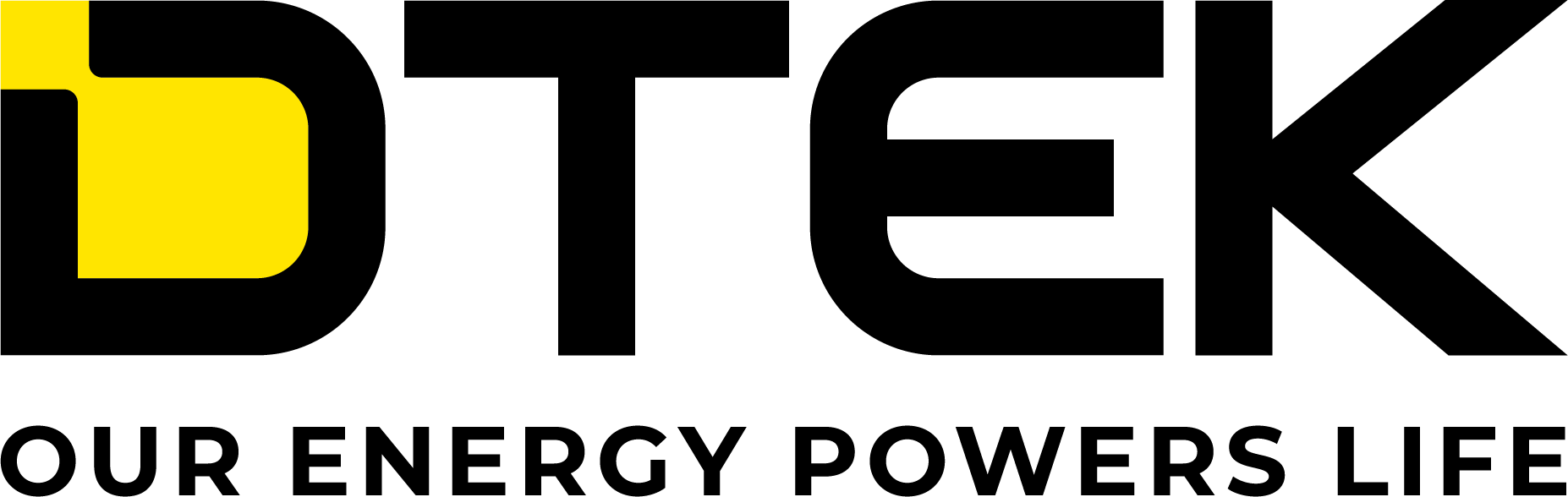
- Native name: ДТЕК
- Industry: Energy sector
- Founded: 2005; 21 years ago
- Founder: Rinat Akhmetov
- Headquarters: Kyiv, Ukraine
- Area served: Ukraine
- Key people: Maksym Tymchenko (CEO)
- Owner: Rinat Akhmetov
- Number of employees: 55,000
- Parent: SCM Holdings
- Website: www.dtek.com/en

DTEK (Ukrainian: ДТЕК) is the largest private investor in the energy industry in Ukraine. The company's enterprises generate electricity at solar, wind and thermal power plants; extract coal and natural gas; trade energy products in the Ukrainian and foreign markets; distribute and supply electricity to consumers; and develop a grid of supercharger stations for electric vehicles.

The main office of the company is located in Kyiv. The company is owned by SCM Holdings.

== Operations ==
DTEK operates through seven key business units:

1. DTEK Renewables: Focuses on wind and solar energy production. It operates wind power plants like Tyligulska, Botiyevska and Prymorska, and solar power plants including Nikopolska and Pokrovska.
2. DTEK Renewables International (DRI): Develops renewable energy projects outside Ukraine, with operations in Poland, Romania, Croatia, and Italy. Projects include battery storage, solar, and onshore wind developments.
3. DTEK Energy: Provides a full cycle of coal-based electricity production, including coal mining, enrichment, and service maintenance of mine equipment.
4. DTEK Grids: Manages electricity distribution and power grid operations in Kyiv, Dnipro, Donetsk, and Odesa Oblasts, serving approximately 5.6 million customers.
5. D.Solutions: Handles retail electricity supply, energy efficiency services, and electric vehicle charging. It manages electricity supplier companies under the YASNO brand and develops a network of fast charging stations (YASNO E-mobility).
6. DTEK Oil & Gas: Oversees the company's oil and gas operations, primarily through Neftegazvydobuvannya, which produces gas and gas condensate in Poltava Oblast.
7. D.Trading: A client-oriented business focused on reliable delivery and quality services. D.Trading primarily trades in power, gas, and fuel. The company also specializes in renewable energy source (RES) management, including price hedging, risk mitigation, comprehensive energy management solutions, and physical portfolio optimization.

== Academy DTEK ==
Academy DTEK is an open educational business platform. The project is a partner of Ukrainian and international business schools and organizations, in particular, INSEAD, IE Business School, Thunderbird, HRCI, Kyiv—Mohyla Business School, FUIB, Kyivstar, VISA, etc.

=== MODUS X ===
MODUS X is the cybersecurity and information security division of DTEK Group. It provides protection for the company’s digital infrastructure and data systems, including those that support critical operations. Since 2022, the unit has detected and prevented more than 150 million attempted cyberattacks targeting DTEK’s networks and assets.

== History ==
=== 2005–2010 ===
DTEK was established in 2005. The company includes Pavlohradvuhillia, Komsomolets Donbasu coal mine, Skhidenergo and Service-Invest.

In 2006, PEM—Energovugillia, Pavlohradska and Kurakhivska CEPs joined in, and in 2007, Dobropilska, Oktiabrska and Mospinska Coal Processing Enterprise.

In 2007, DTEK joined the UN Global Compact. A program to modernize all Skhidenergo power units has been launched, and the rating agencies Moody's and Fitch have assigned international credit ratings to the company for the first time.

In 2008, the Wind Power LLC company has been founded. Later, it became part of the operating company DTEK Renewables, which today manages all of DTEK's renewable energy assets.

In 2009, the company exported electricity to Hungary, Romania and Slovakia for the first time after obtaining the right to access international power grids at an auction.

In 2010, DTEK joined the European industry associations EURACOAL and Eurelectric.

=== 2011–2016 ===
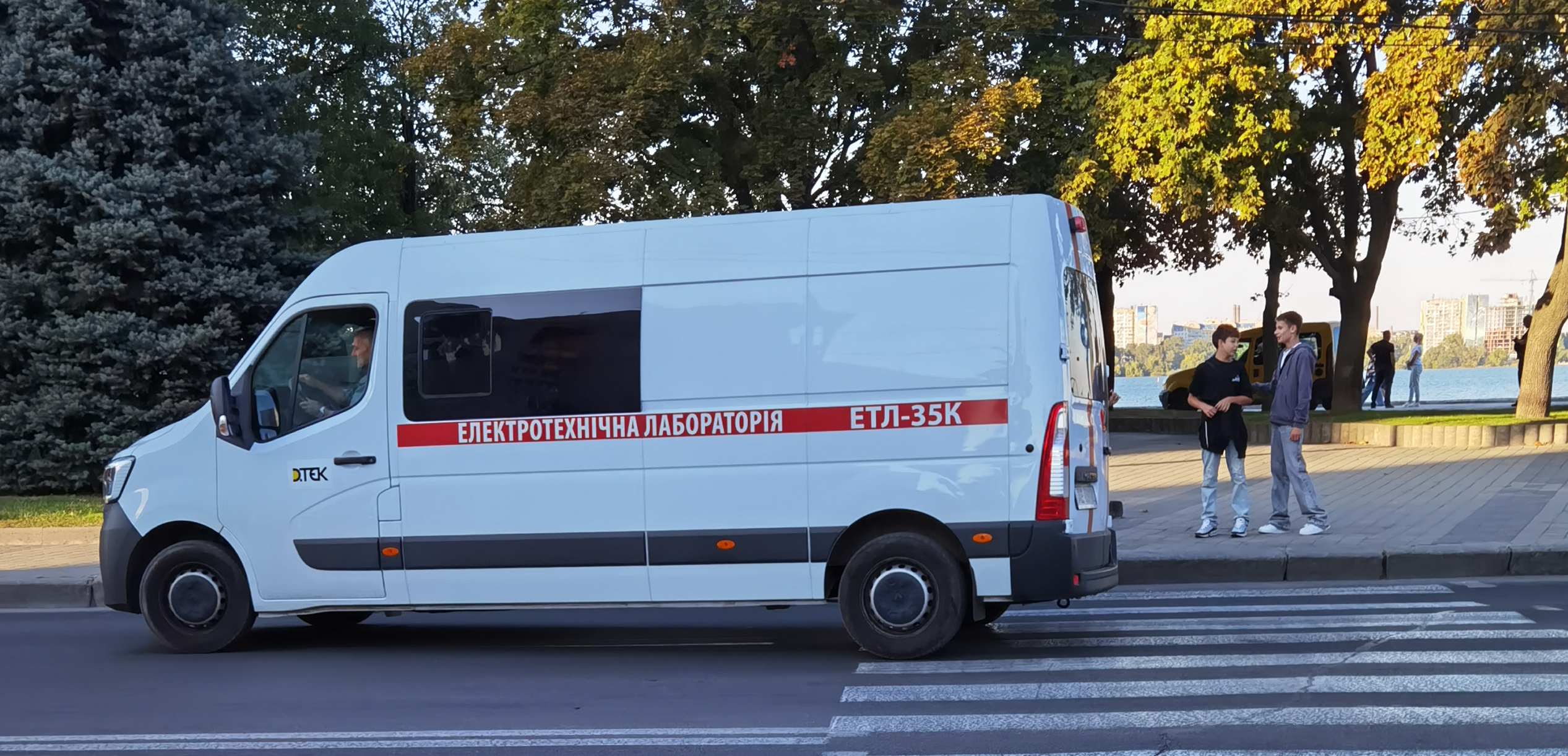
DTEK electric laboratory

In 2011, the company became a member of CSR Europe. The same year, DTEK became the largest private shareholder in PJSC Kyivenergo. The State Property Fund and DTEK also entered into lease and concession agreements for the state enterprises Dobropilliavuhillia, Rovenkyantratsyt and Sverdlovantratsyt.

In May 2011, DTEK Oil&Gas was established to develop projects in the oil and gas industry.

In 2012, the implementation of the first five-year stage of DTEK's long-term development strategy was completed. In 2008–2012, over $2.5 billion was invested in production. This year, the turbines of the first stage of the Botiyevska wind farm were launched. The first acquisition of coal assets outside Ukraine took place — DTEK included the Obukhivska Mine Administration, Donskoy antratsyt and Sulinantratsyt (Russia). In 2021, the information about the sale of assets to the Cyprus structure of Valleyton Investments Limited was made public.

In 2013, DTEK began supplying gas from Europe and acquired a stake in Naftogazvydobuvannia. The second issue of Eurobonds was placed at the amount of $750 million.

In 2014, DTEK power engineers restored power supply for 1.4 million residents in 600 settlements that were de-energized as a result of the hostilities in eastern Ukraine. DTEK also completed the process of reforming the business management system. The management company DTEK and three operating companies were established: DTEK Energy, which provides asset management in coal mining, thermal power generation and electricity distribution, DTEK VDE — in alternative energy, and DTEK Oil&Gas— in natural gas production. Then, the fourth operating company was established to provide comprehensive energy efficiency services — DTEK ESCO. The Botievska wind farm reached its design capacity, became the largest in Ukraine and entered the five largest wind farms in Central and Eastern Europe.

In 2015, Neftegazvydobuvannia put into operation the deepest gas well in Eastern Europe (6,750 m) and reached the highest rate for private gas production in Ukraine.

In 2016, Neftegazvydobuvannia produced 1.6 billion cubic meters of natural gas.

=== 2017–2021 ===
In 2017, DTEK lost control over its enterprises located in certain areas of Donetsk and Luhansk Oblasts. Among them: DTEK Mine Komsomolets Donbassa, Mospinska WFP, DTEK PEM—Energovugillia, DTEK Skhidenergo (OP Zuevska TPP), DTEK Donetskoblenergo, Tehrempostavka, DTEK Sverdlovantratsyt, DTEK Rovenkyantratsyt, Elektronaladka, DTEK High Voltage Grids and DTEK Service. In the same year, the first solar energy facility was commissioned — Tryfanivska SPP in Kherson Oblast. DTEK Prydniprovska TPP switched power units 7–8 from anthracite coal grades to gas-fired ones. DTEK Energy acquired LLC Corum Druzhkivska Machine-Building Plant, LLC ITC Mining Machines and 61.2% of the shares of PrJSC Svitlo Shakhtaria.

In 2018, as part of the electricity market reform, the company completed the unbundling procedure, as a result of which distribution system operators were created on the basis of Kyivenergo, Dniprooblenergo and Donetskoblenergo — DTEK Kyiv electrical grid, DTEK Dnipro electrical grid and DTEK Donetsk electrical grid ". Independently of them, three supplier companies started working: Kyiv Energy Services, Dnipro Energy Services, Donetsk Energy Services. The strategic management of the established OSRs, as well as DTEK High Voltage Grids and DTEK PEM—Energovugillia, is carried out by the operating holding DTEK Grids. To coordinate the work of supplier companies, an independent operating holding D.Solutions (LLC "D.Solutions") was created. The company D.Trading (LLC "D.Trading") was also created, which is responsible for the development of wholesale trade in energy resources on the territory of Ukraine and on external energy markets. In addition, DTEK Renewables signed a contract with General Electric for the construction of two phases of the Prymorska wind farm, began construction of the Nikopolska SPP in partnership with the Chinese company SMES and the construction of the Orel wind farm in partnership with the Danish company Vestas.

Also in 2018, DTEK launched a grid of high-speed charging stations for electric vehicles STRUM, which was renamed YASNO E-mobility in 2019.

In 2019, DTEK Renewables began construction of the Pokrovska SPP. The controlling stakes in Odesaoblenergo and Kyivoblenergo were also acquired. In the same year, the company completed the construction of the Orlivska and Prymorska WPPs, Nikopolska and Pokrovska SPPs, and DTEK's portfolio of renewable energy projects reached 1 GW.

On September 18, 2020, at the request of Sberbank of Russia, the District Court of Amsterdam imposed a $45.1 million restriction on DTEK Energy B.V on certain of the company's assets in the Netherlands. Also in 2020, DTEK joined the new global Platform of the World Economic Forum to combat COVID-19. In addition, DTEK Renewables received the Green Bond Pioneer Award from the Climate Bond Initiative for its debut green bond issue.

In 2021, DTEK Renewables started construction of the first stage of the Tylihul wind farm in cooperation with the Danish company Vestas. Also in 2021, DTEK acquired 24.5% of Kirovogradoblenergo from VS Energy.

=== 2022–2025 ===
Russia's full-scale invasion of Ukraine began on February 24, 2022. However, for DTEK's power engineers, the full-scale war began on February 22, 2022. On that day, the Luhansk Power Station in Shchastia was shelled by the Russian military and on February 25, 2022, the plant was seized by the Russian military and is still under their control. Also, on the night of February 24, Ukraine was completely disconnected from the power grid of Russia and Belarus and began to operate in an isolated mode, performing technical checks on the way to synchronization with ENTSO-E. In March, DTEK Group started supplying electricity free of charge to medical facilities, military and law enforcement agencies, as well as bread producers in Kyiv, Donetsk and Dnipropetrovsk Oblasts. On March 3, 2022, the first three DTEK employees were killed in the hostilities. DTEK Group appealed to global energy traders and the largest consumers of Russian oil and gas to impose a full embargo on Russian energy.

On March 16, the Ukrainian power system was synchronized with the ENTSO-E power grid of continental Europe. DTEK Energy's thermal power plants made a significant contribution to the operation of the Ukrainian power system in an isolated mode.

DTEK significantly increased its humanitarian and military support efforts. The company allocated UAH 1,8 billion for humanitarian purposes and to support the Ukrainian army. Additionally, DTEK supplied UAH 250 million worth of electricity to military facilities and hospitals free of charge.

On May 18, 2022, DTEK Kyiv Regional Grids specialists completed the restoration of power supply in Kyiv Oblast, which had been liberated from Russian forces on April 2, 2022. The company's energy workers managed to complete the work within 45 days, 15 days earlier than initially announced. DTEK Group invested UAH 300 million into the restoration of electrical grids in Kyiv Oblast.

The company's Oil&Gas portfolio companies acquired the rights to develop two gas fields in Poltava Oblast for UAH 1.3 billion at an open auction.

In 2023, DTEK made strides in renewable energy development. The company opened Phase I of the Tylihul Wind Power Plant (WPP) in Mykolaiv Oblast, just 100 km from the frontline. The plant's 19 turbines have an installed capacity of 114 MW, capable of generating up to 390,000 kWh annually, enough to power 200,000 households. DTEK Renewables also initiated pre-design works for the Poltavska Wind Power Plant in Hlobyne, Poltava Oblast.

On December 4, 2023, DTEK Group and Vestas signed a Memorandum of Understanding to complete the construction of the Tylihul Wind Power Plant, set to become the largest wind farm in Eastern Europe. The project, supported by the European Commission and the governments of Ukraine and Denmark, will have an installed capacity of 500 megawatts and a total investment exceeding 650 million Euros/ In a legal victory, DTEK won a case against Russia at The Hague over seized Crimean assets.

DTEK's expansion continued into 2024, with the company bringing online its first energy projects outside Ukraine. These include two Romanian projects: a wind farm in Ruginoasa and a solar plant in Glodeni. The company also launched a fresh investment drive in Japan to mobilize support for Ukraine's energy sector, which included signing a new cybersecurity agreement to protect vital civilian energy infrastructure against Russian hackers.

In 2024, DTEK Group entered the Polish renewables market with plans to build the country's first large-scale battery storage project, signaling the company's growing European ambitions.

In 2024, DTEK expanded its renewable energy operations in Romania and announced a €140 million investment in energy storage systems aimed at strengthening Ukraine’s energy security. That same year, the company received its first shipment of liquefied natural gas (LNG) to Ukraine from the United States.

In 2025, DTEK announced a €450 million investment to expand the Tyligulska wind farm, marking its largest investment since the start of the full-scale war in Ukraine. The company also partnered with Octopus Energy Group to launch the RISE initiative, focused on boosting energy resilience. In the same year, DTEK and Fluence commissioned Ukraine’s largest battery energy storage facility, with a total capacity of 200 MW, and celebrated the 20th anniversary of its founding.

== Energy transformation: decarbonization and European integration ==
=== Corporate social responsibility projects ===
The following projects belong to corporate social compliance:

“Come On, Let’s Play!” is a long-running social project supported by DTEK in partnership with FC Shakhtar Donetsk. The initiative promotes children’s physical development and social inclusion by creating safe sports spaces and providing free football training for thousands of boys and girls across Ukraine, including children with disabilities.

== DTEK during the Russian invasion of Ukraine in 2022 ==
Following Russia’s full-scale invasion of Ukraine in February 2022, DTEK became a key provider in maintaining the country’s energy stability under wartime conditions. The company has worked to restore electricity across Ukraine, rebuild damaged facilities, and expand renewable capacity despite ongoing missile and drone attacks.

=== The Fight for Light ===
DTEK launched its “Fight for Light” initiative to restore power and protect Ukraine’s energy independence. Since the start of the invasion, the company has reconnected power for more than 24 million families, invested over €200 million in restoring damaged facilities, and paid €2.6 billion in taxes to support the national budget.

=== Energy under attack ===
Russian forces have repeatedly targeted Ukraine’s energy infrastructure. By early 2024, about 90 percent of DTEK’s thermal generation capacity had been damaged or destroyed. Since February 2022, Russia has launched more than 210 individual missile and drone strikes against DTEK’s thermal power plants. At the peak of the attacks, 13 million Ukrainians were simultaneously left without electricity. The estimated nationwide damage to energy infrastructure exceeds €15 billion.

=== Keeping the lights on ===
DTEK’s engineers and technicians have repaired power lines, rebuilt thermal power plants, and expanded renewable generation in hostile conditions. Since the start of the full-scale invasion, DTEK has reconnected households 24.8 million times.

=== Cyber defence ===
DTEK’s cybersecurity division, MODUS X, has protected critical infrastructure from large-scale digital threats. Operating a 24/7 Security Operations Centre, the team improved its detection speed tenfold and response time fivefold, ensuring the continuity of Ukraine’s power systems under constant attack. Its systems have also repelled more than 150 million attempted cyberattacks.

=== Supporting employees and veterans ===
Thousands of DTEK employees have joined Ukraine's armed forces since 2022. More than 5,300 have served, close to 400 have been killed, and over 900 have been wounded. The company provides financial and medical support to veterans and their families, including the Veteran+ programme offering extended medical insurance and professional reintegration assistance.

=== Continuing investment and international expansion ===
Despite wartime challenges, DTEK has continued to invest in Ukraine’s and Europe’s energy future.

- In 2023, the company commissioned the Tyligulska Wind Farm, the first built during active war.
- In 2024, DTEK launched its first EU renewable projects in Romania (Ruginoasa Wind Farm and Glodeni Solar Park) and entered Poland’s energy storage market with the 133 MW Trzebinia battery project. It also announced a €140 million investment in energy storage systems for Ukraine and received the country’s first LNG shipment from the US.
- In 2025, DTEK committed €450 million to expand the Tyligulska Wind Farm – the largest investment since the invasion – and, with Octopus Energy Group, launched the RISE initiative to strengthen energy resilience. Together with Fluence, DTEK also commissioned Ukraine’s largest battery storage facility, with a capacity of 200 MW.

=== Appeal for international support ===
DTEK continues to call for international cooperation to protect Ukraine’s energy system. Priority needs include advanced air defence systems, replacement equipment such as turbines and transformers, financing for reconstruction, technical expertise, support for European grid integration, and investment in renewable generation to ensure long-term resilience.

== Awards and recognitions ==
=== 2025 ===
- Eighty-eight DTEK power engineers received state awards for their rapid restoration of electricity supply after enemy attacks.
- DTEK Group won the Energy and Natural Resources category at the SABRE Awards for its Fight for Light art installation.
- The company received three honours — Best Media Relations Campaign, Best B2B Campaign, and Best Event, Launch or Stunt in a Campaign — for Fight for Light at the ICCO Global Awards 2024.
- DTEK was recognised in two categories, Social Marketing and Social Media Campaign, for the Fight for Light project and DTEK TikTok at the X-RAY Marketing Project Competition.
- The Fight for Light campaign earned DTEK the Humanitarian Response Champions award, while CEO Maxim Timchenko was named Leader of the Year at the Global Good Awards.
- DTEK received eight honours — six gold and two silver — at the Davos Communications Awards 2025 for its Fight for Light campaign.
- The Fight for Light installation was added to the permanent collection of the National Museum of the History of Ukraine in the Second World War.
- DTEK Grids won three categories — Communications with Employees in Time of War, Digital Creativity, and Art and Entertainment — at the IPRA Golden World Awards 2024.
- Academy DTEK received the Future-proof Education award for its The Sustainable Digital Evolution: People First! project at the Emerging Europe Awards 2024.

=== 2024 ===
- Two hundred and nine DTEK engineers were honoured by the state for ensuring continuous power supply during wartime.
- DTEK was recognised as Ukraine’s largest private investor during the war by NV Top 50.
- The company won in the Digital HR category for its Unified HR Ecosystem project at the HR Brand Ukraine 2024 awards.
- DTEK Renewables was named Onshore Wind Developer of the Year at the Wind Investment Awards 2024 for constructing the Tyligulska Wind Power Plant during wartime.

=== 2023 ===
- Thirty DTEK engineers received state awards for courage and contributions to maintaining power supply and assisting the Armed Forces.
- DTEK was honoured at the S&P Global Platts Energy Awards in New York for its role in sustaining Ukraine’s energy system during war.
- Forbes Ukraine named DTEK the largest private investor in the national economy during wartime.
- Academy DTEK won the Brand and Sustainability award at the Global CCU Awards 2023 for advancing corporate and social sustainability.
- DTEK Renewables received the Renewable Top Plant Award from POWER magazine for completing the Tyligulska Wind Power Plant under wartime conditions.
- The company also won in the Planet category at the UN Global Compact Partnership for Sustainable Development 2023 for the same project.

=== 2022 ===
- DTEK Grids won Best Corporate Communications and Best Environmental Project for its #Storks initiative at the IPRA Golden World Awards 2022.

=== 2021 ===
- DTEK received the Partnership for Sustainability Award 2020 for its Community with Your Own Hands project within the UN Global Compact Network Ukraine campaign.
- DTEK Renewables earned an Eco-Oscar for the Bird Islands biodiversity project at the ECOtransformation 2021 forum.
- DTEK Grids won Best Corporate Communications in the World 2020 and Best Reputation and Brand Management for its #BrightDeeds project at the Golden World Awards 2021.

=== 2020 ===
- DTEK was recognised for its Youth Movement initiative at the CSR Development Centre Awards for contributing to UN Sustainable Development Goal 8.
- DTEK Renewables received honours from the Climate Bonds Initiative and GlobalCapital for issuing Ukraine’s first corporate green bonds.
- DTEK Grids and DTEK Oil&Gas won Eco-Oscars at ECOtransformation 2020 for projects preserving the white stork population and applying innovative technologies.
- YASNO, a DTEK supplier, was named Ukraine’s top electricity provider for two consecutive years by the DiXi Group and the USAID Energy Sector Transparency Project.
