= Bioenergy in Ukraine =

In 2021 biomass such as woodchips provided 9 percent of Ukraine’s heat production, for example for heating public buildings.

== History ==
Stoves were used for heating.

Ukrainians played the role in transient stage of biogas development due to Vasily Omeljanskij or Alexei Isantchenko (he tried unsuccessfully decomposed cellulose with aerobes in 1920). The achievements of Vasily Omeljanskij were honored by naming one of the strain bacteria that decomposes ethanol which was discovered in 1916 and isolated in 1940 by H.A Barker – Methanobacterium omeljanskij. Ukraine developed biogas plants between years 1948 and 1993 as a part of USSR scientiﬁc plan with center at Tbilisi in 1948 which moved to Zaporozhe in 1984.

== Biogas ==
There is a high biogas potential in Ukraine. In Ukraine, there are few examples of biogas technologies implementation. The first one among active full-scale biogas plants on animal waste, was built in 1993 on a pig farm "Zaporizhstal". After that, biogas plants of companies "Agro-Oven", "Elite", "Ukrainian Milk Company" have been launched. As of 2012 on the basis of agricultural enterprises in Ukraine there operated four biogas plants.

Ukraine's agricultural sector producing large amounts of organic waste, potentially has the resources for biogas generation, which is able to replace the 2.6 billion m3 of NG per year. With the further development of agriculture and the wide use of green material (silage, grass), this potential can be extended according to various estimates from 7.711 to 1812 billion m3 NG per year. In the first case it is supposed to use 6% of arable land (50% abandoned land) in Ukraine for growing corn silage for biogas with a conservative yield of 30 t/ha. The share of biogas from maize silage will contribute 53.0% of the total potential; biogas from the by-products and crop residues - 5.7%; biogas from by-products and waste of the food processing industry - 5.3%; and biogas from the animal manure waste - 36%. The second option with a higher forecast involves the use of 7.9 million hectares of land available for growing maize for biogas considering increased productivity.

Potential for biogas production at existing agriculture enterprises of Ukraine and with the cultivation maize silage for biogas production at 50% of free arable land (with a yield of 40 tons green mass per 1 ha and biogas output 180 m3/t).

Biogas power in Ukraine is growing. As of the end of 2014, there were 10 biogas installations in the country with a total capacity of 15 MW, and by the end of the second quarter of 2018 - 29 plants with a capacity of 41 MW.

As of beginning of 2019 51 MW power is in operation.

== Biodiesel ==
In 2014, in the village of Luky (Sambir Raion), Sambir Raion was launched the first in country facility for production of biodiesel with capacity of 25 tons of fuel per day from rapeseed.

== Bioethanol ==
In Ukraine, the production of bioethanol is based on molasses as a byproduct of sugar beet production. It replaces about 0.7% of hydrocarbon gasoline, which corresponds approximately to 0.4% in energy terms.

Agreement on the Association of Ukraine with the EU signed in 2014 envisages an increase in the share of bioethanol to 5.75%. Expected amount of bioethanol production up to 320 thousand tons. Also, the development of bioethanol production on the basis of corn began.

== Biomass ==
On January 24, 2018, at a meeting of the Bureau of the Presidium of the National Academy of Agrarian Sciences of Ukraine, the issues of scientific support for the energy autonomy of agro-industrial production were considered.

On the territory of the Forestry Gorenivka OTG of the Khmelnytskyi Oblast, a straw plant will be built and will generate 130 MW of thermal power (46.4 MW of electric power). As fuel in the future power plant, straw of different types will be used in Heston bundles - about 270 thousand tons per year. The main equipment of the power plant and technology will be supplied by Danish company Burmeister & Wain Scandinavian Contractor, BWSC. The project of the station was published by Khmelnitskyi Biofuel Power Plant LLC, which owns a land plot of 16 hectares. The area of the building will be 5 hectares.

In February 2019, Kernel announced it will build four biomass power plants for $56 million. Power stations in biomass will appear at the company's facilities in the Kharkiv, Mykolaiv, Odesa and Poltava regions. The company received a $48 million loan from the EBRD and a $8 million loan from the Clean Technology Fund. Together, these plants will produce 338.5 thousand MW of electricity per year with about 228 thousand tons of husk of sunflower.

On the territory of the Forestry Gorenivka OTG of the Khmelnytskyi Oblast, a straw plant will be built and will generate 130 MW of thermal power (46.4 MW of electric power). As fuel in the future power plant, straw of different types will be used in Heston bundles - about 270 thousand tons per year. The main equipment of the power plant and technology will be supplied by Danish company Burmeister & Wain Scandinavian Contractor, BWSC. The project of the station was published by Khmelnitskyi Biofuel Power Plant LLC, which owns a land plot of 16 hectares. The area of the building will be 5 hectares.

== See also ==
- Renewable energy in Ukraine
- Solar power in Ukraine
- Wind power in Ukraine
- Geothermal power in Ukraine
- Hydroelectricity in Ukraine
- Renewable energy by country

== Sources ==
- Fostering Investment in the Biomass Sector in Ukraine
