= Energy in Ukraine =

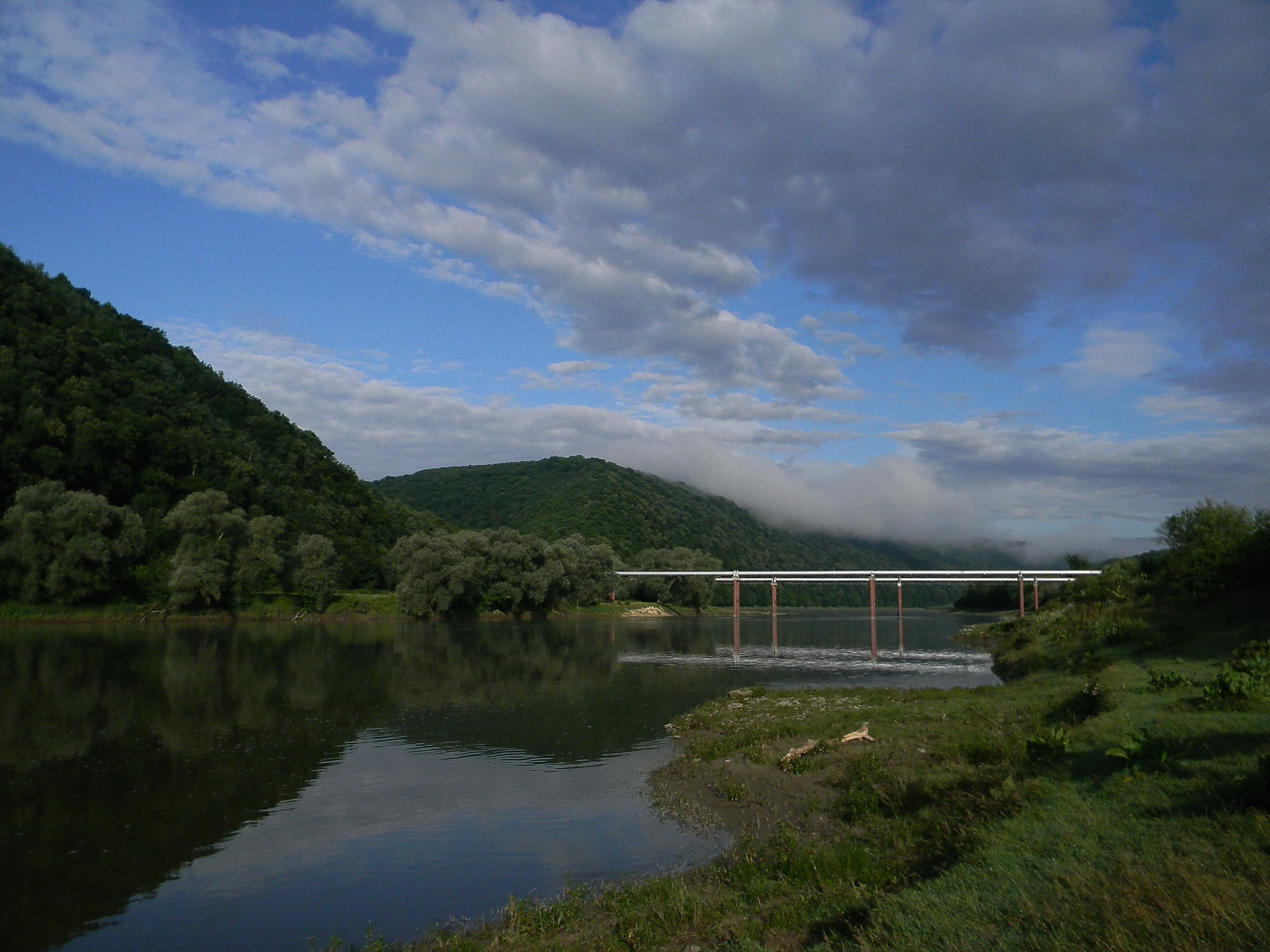
Gas pipeline in Dniester Canyon National Nature Park

Ukraine mostly uses energy from gas, followed by nuclear, oil and coal. The country has a diversified energy mix. Most gas and oil is imported, and energy policy prioritises energy security and diversifying energy supply. Integration with EU energy is in the energy strategy to 2050, and resilience and net zero carbon emissions. The energy and climate plan to 2030 includes efficiency.

Ukraine’s gas network has much storage, which can be useful for storing Europe's gas to even out supply and demand, and in the first quarter of the 21st century it transited much Russian natural gas to Europe. Energy infrastructure is much changed due to the Russo-Ukrainian war —some has been destroyed by Russian attacks, but wind farms and solar power are thought to be resilient because they are distributed. The coal industry has been disrupted by the war, and most electricity generation is nuclear.

== Policy ==
Energy policy includes aligning with the energy policy of the European Union.

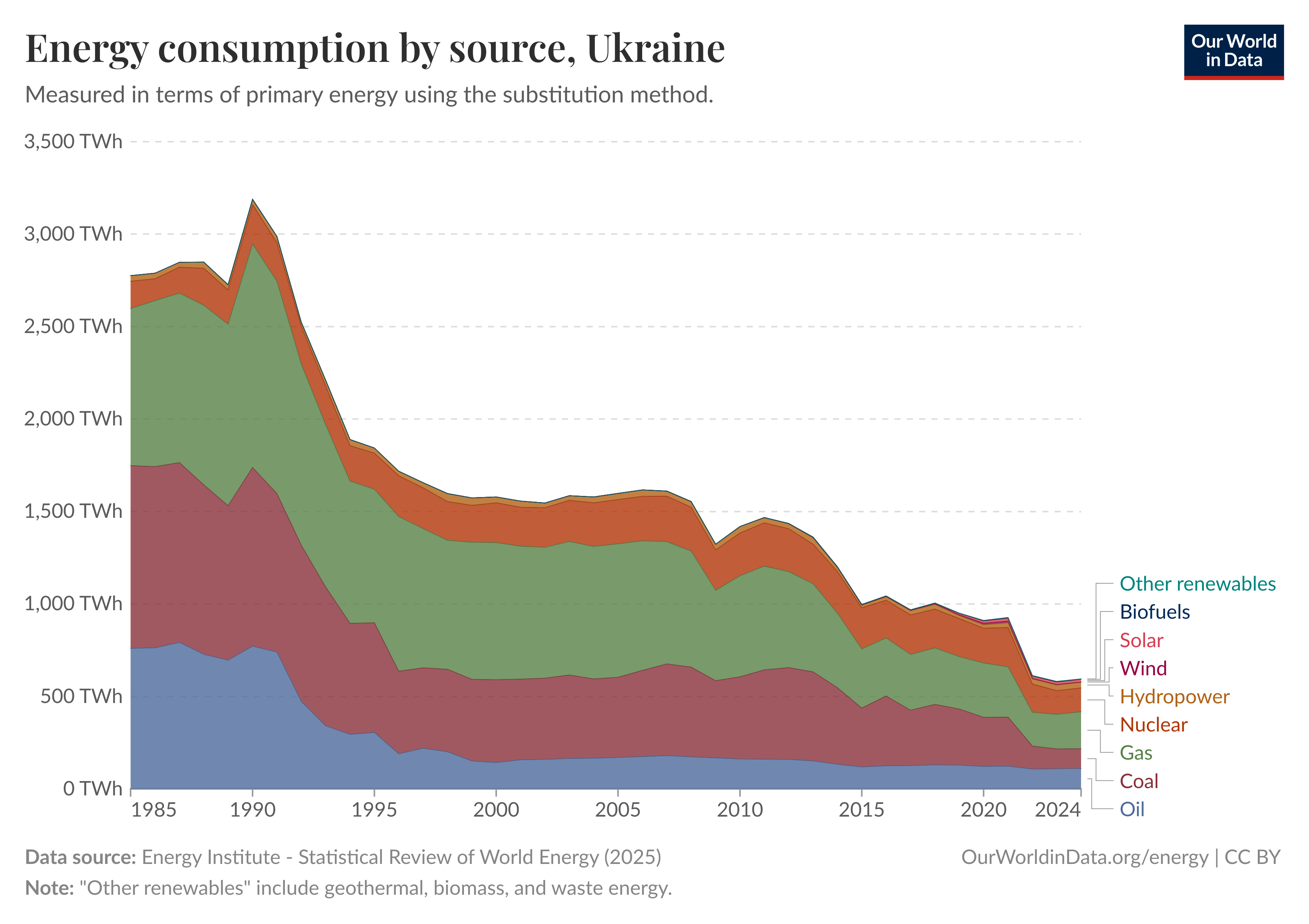
Energy consumption declined in the 1990s after the breakup of the Soviet Union and in the 2010s and 2020s during the war with Russia.

== History ==
When Ukraine was part of the Soviet Union, large energy systems were constructed to meet the needs of industry and to provide redundancy in case of a war with NATO, and after independence it relied on cheap energy from Russia. Since the fall of Yanukovych, governments have tried to integrate with energy in the EU, before the full scale invasion there were mostly monopolies.

In 2011, Ukraine joined the European Energy Community, but there has been slow progress on implementing European energy regulations. Energy infrastructure is somewhat resilient due to overbuilding by the Soviet Union.

Fossil fuel subsidies were USD 1.6 billion in 2021.

== Gas ==
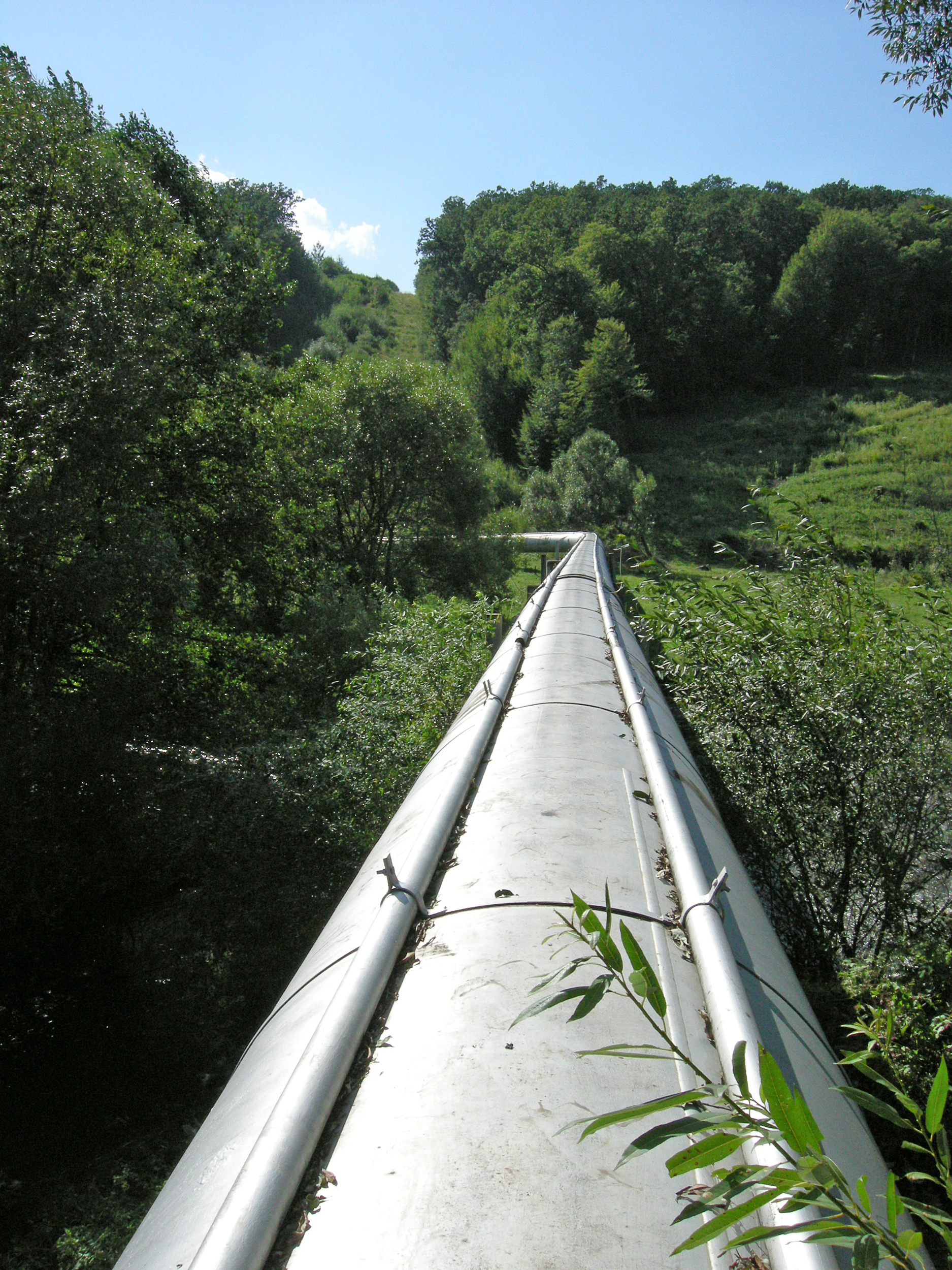
Ternopil

Gas is an important part of energy in Ukraine. About 20 billion cubic meters of fossil gas is extracted each year, and since 2022 this has almost met demand, which in winter can reach 150 mcm a day. Ukraine has the largest gas storage in Europe.

== Oil ==
In 2022 almost a fifth of total energy supply in Ukraine was from oil, and most energy imports were oil products such as gasoline and diesel. The country used to produce and refine its own oil. Strategic reserves of oil and products were set up after 2023 to help with energy security.

Products from Lukoil have been banned from transiting the country, except to Hungary. This goes through the Druzhba pipeline. Excise duty on diesel and gasoline was increased in 2024. The Odesa–Brody pipeline is not being used as of 2023. Refineries, such as Kremenchuk were destroyed or shutdown in 2022 in the Russo-Ukrainian war.

Formerly supplied from Russia and Belarus, gasoline and diesel now come from ports in Poland and Romania.

== Coal ==
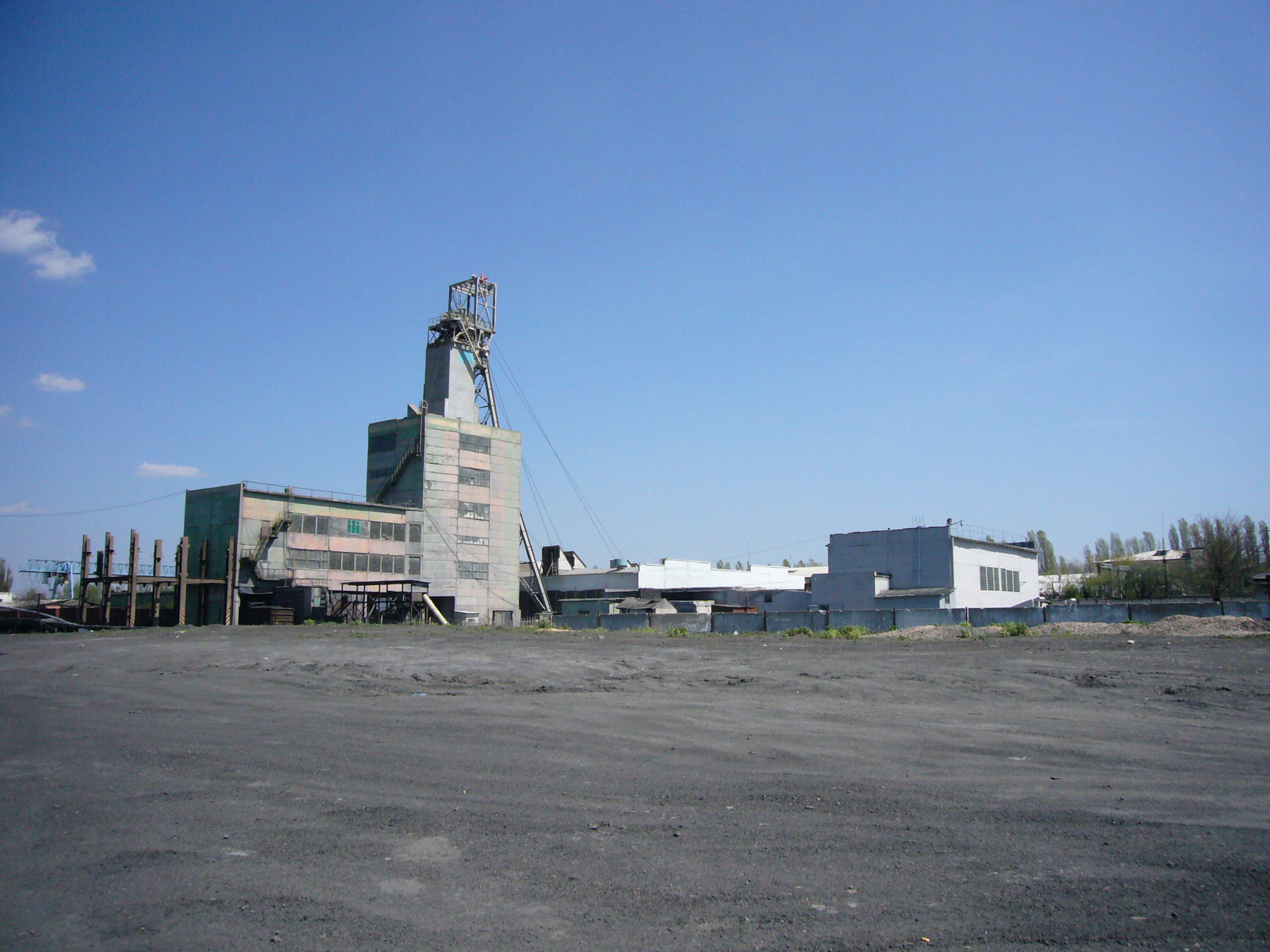
Samarska Coal Mine, near Ternivka

Coal mining has historically been an important industry in Ukraine. Although the industry is often associated with the coal-rich Donets basin in the east of the country, other coal mining regions include the Lviv-Volhynian basin and the Dnieper brown coal mining basin. The Donets basin is Ukraine's most developed and largest coal mining region.

In 2013, Ukraine was the third largest coal producer in Europe. In 1976, national production was 218 million metric tonnes. By 2016, production had dropped to 41 million metric tonnes. The Donets Black Coal Basin in eastern Ukraine, with 90% of the nation's reserves, suffers from three connected problems: (1) mines are not profitable enough to sustain capital investment, resulting in aging mining equipment and processes, (2) the government, taking advice from the International Monetary Fund, has discontinued $600 million annual mining subsidies, and (3) the Ukrainian government refuses to buy from mines controlled by Russia.

== Electricity ==
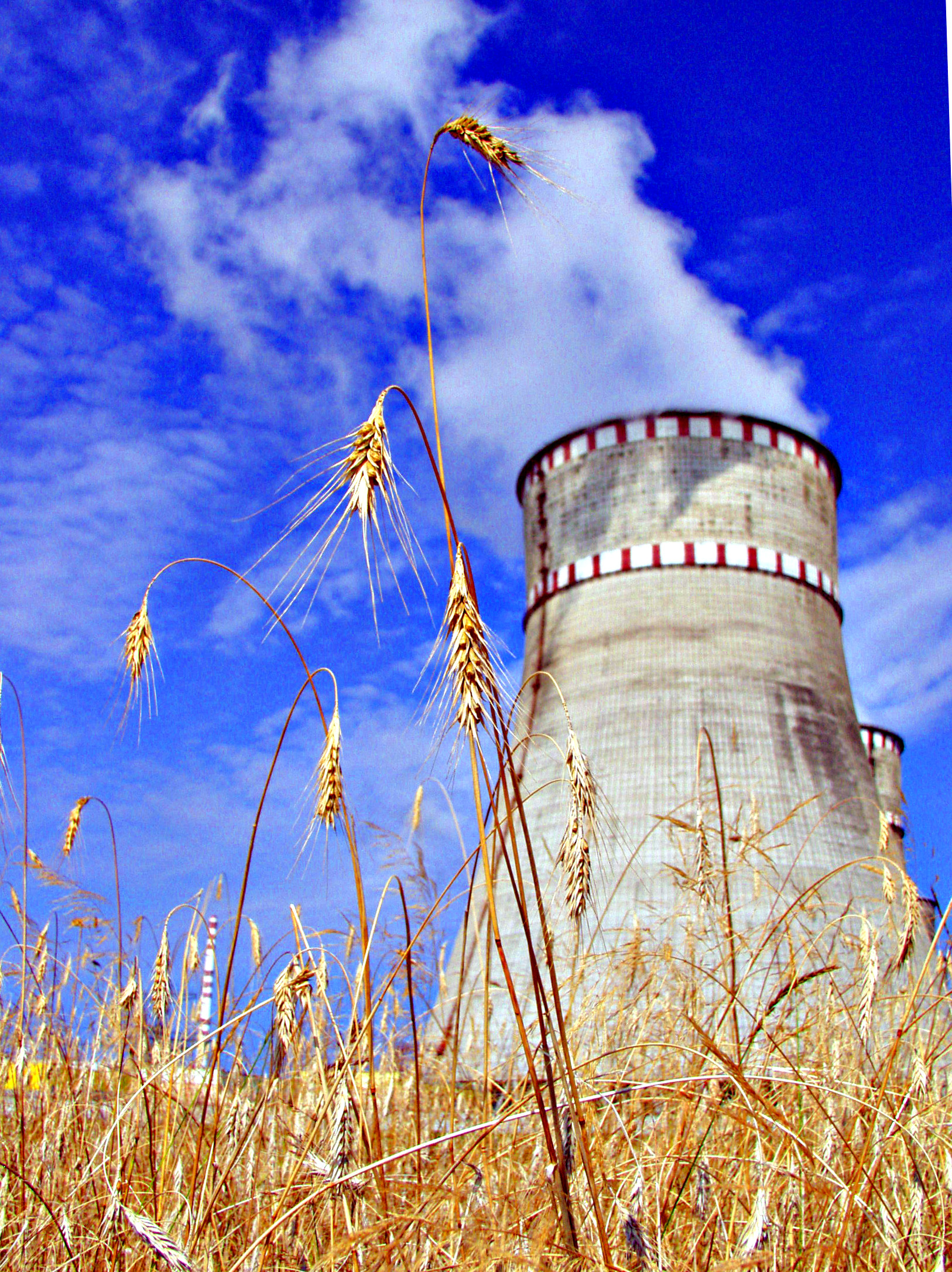
Rivne Nuclear Power Plant in Western Ukraine

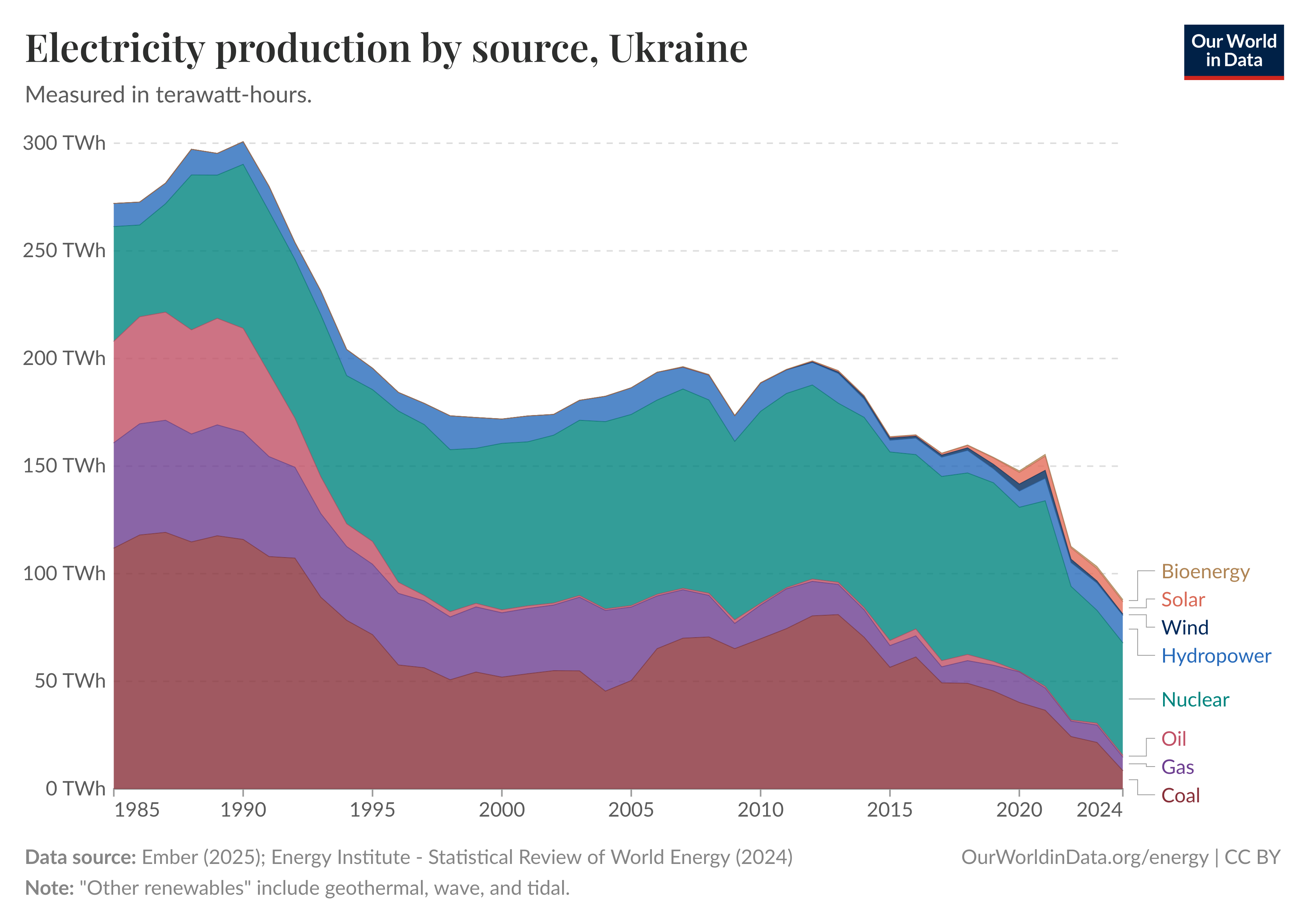
Electricity generation by source

Electricity is an important part of energy in Ukraine. Most electricity generation is nuclear. The bulk of Energoatom output is sold to the government's "guaranteed buyer" to keep prices more stable for domestic customers. Until the 2010s all of Ukraine's nuclear fuel came from Russia, but now most does not.

Some electricity infrastructure was destroyed in the Russo-Ukrainian War, but wind farms, solar power and batteries are thought to be resilient because they are distributed. As of 2025 there is about a third of pre-invasion installed capacity. As of 2025 just over 2 GW can be imported from other European countries, but that is not enough to cover peak demand. Better air defence is needed, and many small gas-turbine generators are being installed to generate flexibly to reduce the blackouts being caused by Russian attacks. As of 2025 the Energy Ministry is prioritising decentralisation for energy security, such as rooftop solar with batteries.

=== Renewable energy ===
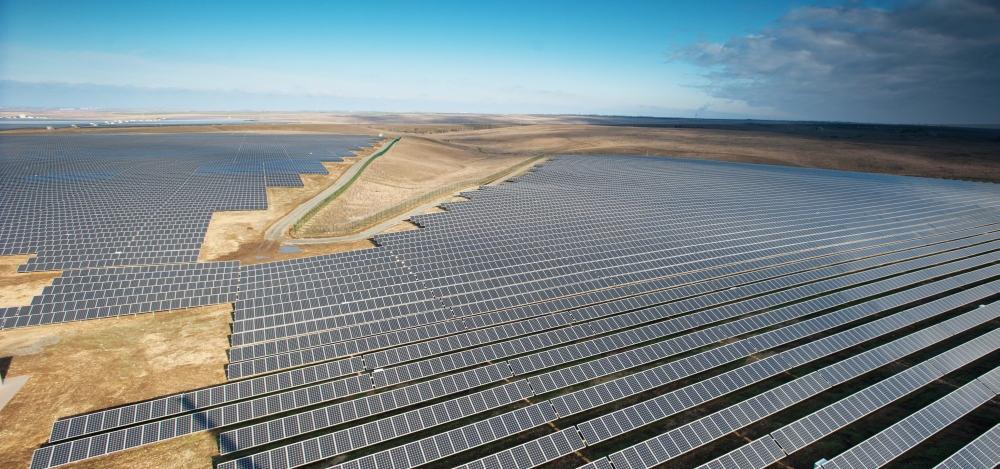
Perovo Solar Park

Less than 10% of energy in Ukraine is renewables. (Note: excluding traditional biomass such as wood) Biomass provides renewable heat. There is a National Renewable Energy Action Plan to 2030.

Decentralized electricity generation, such as rooftop solar, improves energy security.

== Heating ==
District heating has been attacked and significantly damaged. In 2024 the International Energy Agency (IEA) wrote about heat supply to Ukraine’s major cities. “Most attacks on heating infrastructure have occurred in regions close to the front lines. The Kharkiv region is now without large-scale heat generating capacity and other frontline regions – particularly Chernihiv, Donetsk, Zaporizhzhia, Sumy and Mykolaiv – have suffered severe damage to their heat generation capacities. Heat supply is also at risk in Ukraine’s capital, Kyiv.”

== Efficiency and demand response ==
As of 2025 it is much less energy efficient than the EU. In 2024 the IEA recommended engaging consumers in energy saving and demand response, while continuing investments in energy efficiency. They said that “a social tariff that safeguards a certain volume of consumption at subsidised rates, after which consumers pay a higher price, would help to incentivise efficient practices and investments, supported by public information campaigns that advise on energy efficiency measures for immediate impact as well as longer-term gains. Lowering the default temperature for district heating can also provide quick savings.”

== Personnel and finance ==
Ukraine signed a loan agreement in principle for $3.65 billion with the China Development Bank in 2012, during President Viktor Yanukovich's term of office, contingent on the development of agreed projects in the coal and gas sectors. However, by 2017, Ukraine had not agreed to any suitable projects due to a "lack of convergence in the positions of [Uglesintezgaz] and the energy ministry". Elementum Energy Ltd owns the most power plants. In 2025 financial assistance is needed for emergency repairs. As of 2025 households were still paying less than the market price.

The European Investment Bank is financing municipal district heating and energy efficiency projects. Although by 2024 more women were working in the energy sector than before they were still underrepresented in leadership positions.
