= Electricity in Ukraine =

Electricity sector of Ukraine
Data
- Installed capacity (2025): 13 GW

Institutions
- Responsibility for transmission: Ukrenergo
- Responsibility for regulation: National Electricity Regulatory Commission of Ukraine

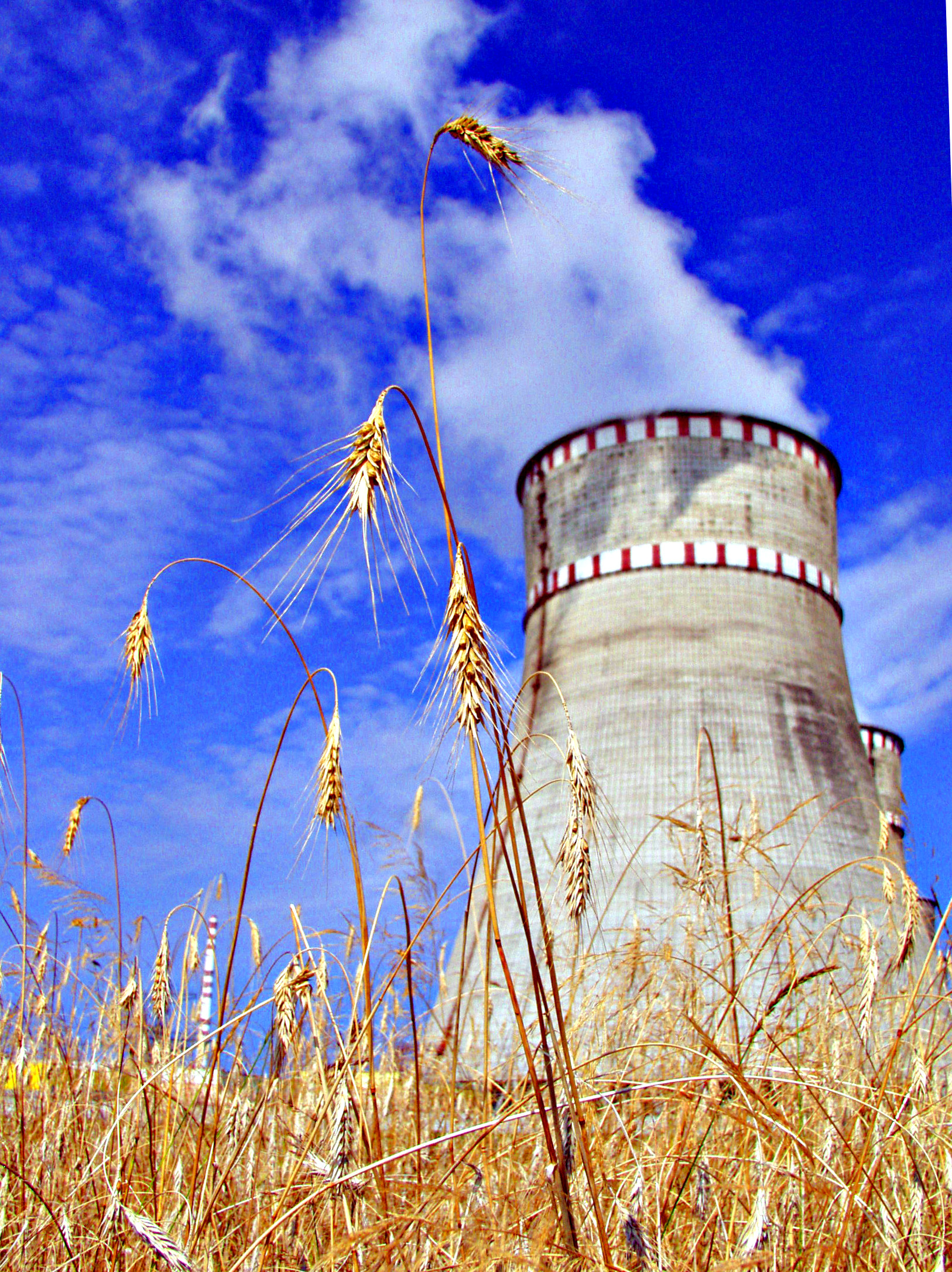
Rivne Nuclear Power Plant in Western Ukraine

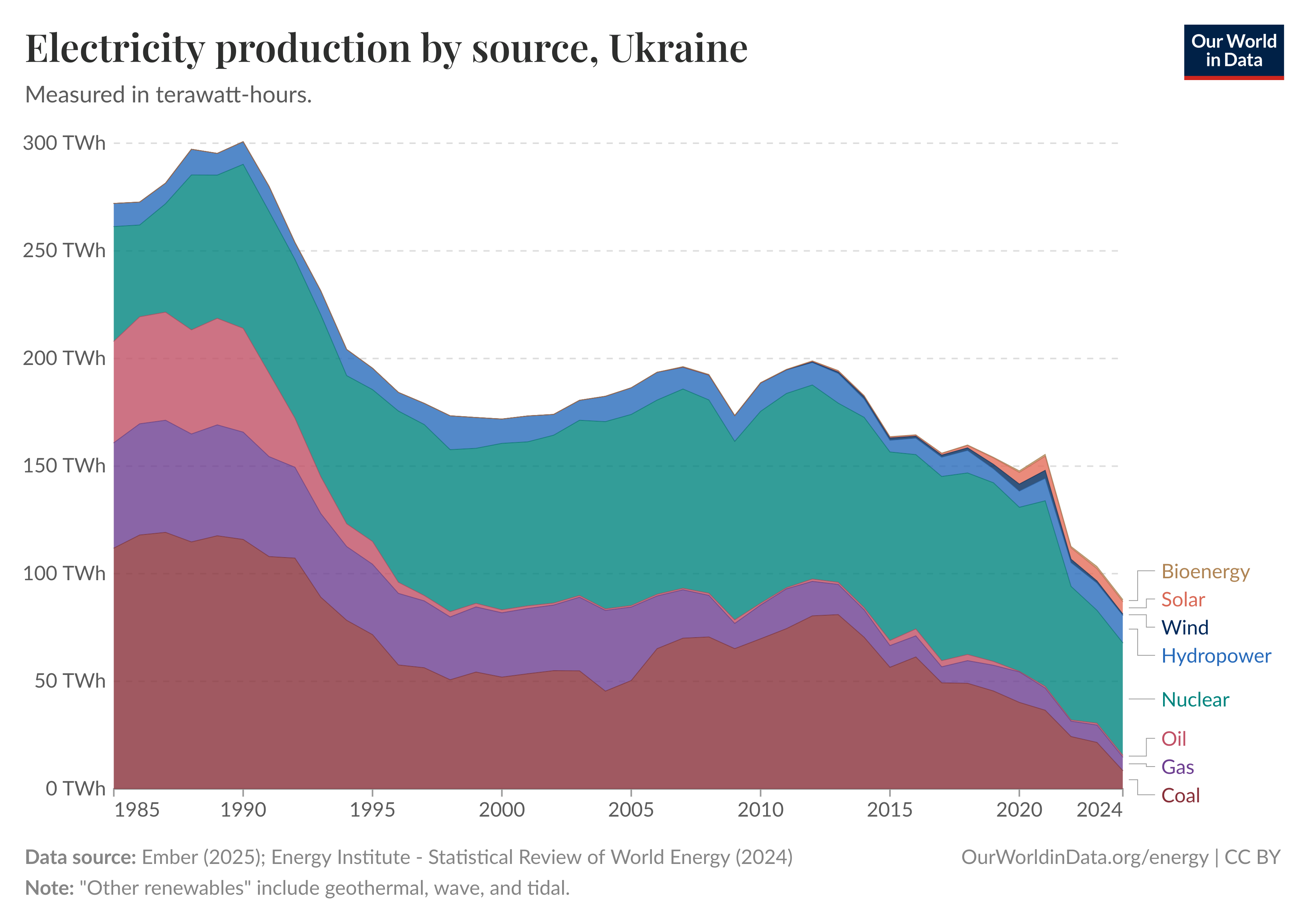
Electricity generation by source

Electricity is an important part of energy in Ukraine. Most electricity generation is nuclear. The bulk of Energoatom output is sold to the government's "guaranteed buyer" to keep prices more stable for domestic customers. Until the 2010s all of Ukraine's nuclear fuel came from Russia, but now most does not.

Some electricity infrastructure was destroyed in the Russo-Ukrainian War, but wind farms, solar power and batteries are thought to be resilient because they are distributed. As of 2025 there is about a third of pre-invasion installed capacity. As of 2025 just over 2 GW can be imported from other European countries, but that is not enough to cover peak demand. Better air defence is needed, and many small gas-turbine generators are being installed to generate flexibly to reduce the blackouts being caused by Russian attacks. As of 2025 the Energy Ministry is prioritising decentralisation for energy security, such as rooftop solar with batteries.

== History ==
Electricity production fell from 296 TWh in 1991 to 171 TWh in 1999, then increased slowly to 195 TWh in 2007, before falling again. In 2014, consumption was 134 TWh after transmission losses of 20 TWh, with peak demand at about 28 GWe. 8 TWh was exported to Europe. In 2015 electricity production fell to about 146 TWh largely due to a fall in anthracite coal supplies caused by the War in Donbass.

In July 2019, a new wholesale energy market was launched, intended to bring real competition in the generation market and help future integration with Europe. The change was a prerequisite for receiving European Union assistance. It led to in increased price for industrial consumers of between 14% and 28% during July. The bulk of Energoatom output is sold to the government's "guaranteed buyer" to keep prices more stable for domestic customers.

=== Grid synchronisation with Europe ===
Since 2017 Ukraine sought to divest itself of dependency on the Unified Power System of Russia (UPS) and instead connect westwards to the synchronous grid of Continental Europe, thereby participating in European electricity markets. Power lines coupling the country to the grids of neighbouring Poland, Romania, Slovakia and Hungary existed, but were de-energised.

A necessary prerequisite of Ukrainian integration was for the country to successfully demonstrate it was capable of running in an 'islanded' manner, maintaining satisfactory control of its own frequency. To do that would require disconnection from the UPS grid, and a date of 24 February 2022 was set. This proved to be the date Russia invaded Ukraine, but the disconnection nonetheless proceeded to schedule. Ukraine placed an urgent request to synchronise with the European grid to ENTSO-E, the European collective of transmission system operators of which it was a member, and on 16 March 2022 the western circuits were energised, bringing both Ukraine and Moldova, which is coupled to the Ukrainian grid, into the European synchronised grid. On 16 March 2022 a trial synchronisation started of the Ukraine and Moldova grid with the European grid.

=== Wartime ===
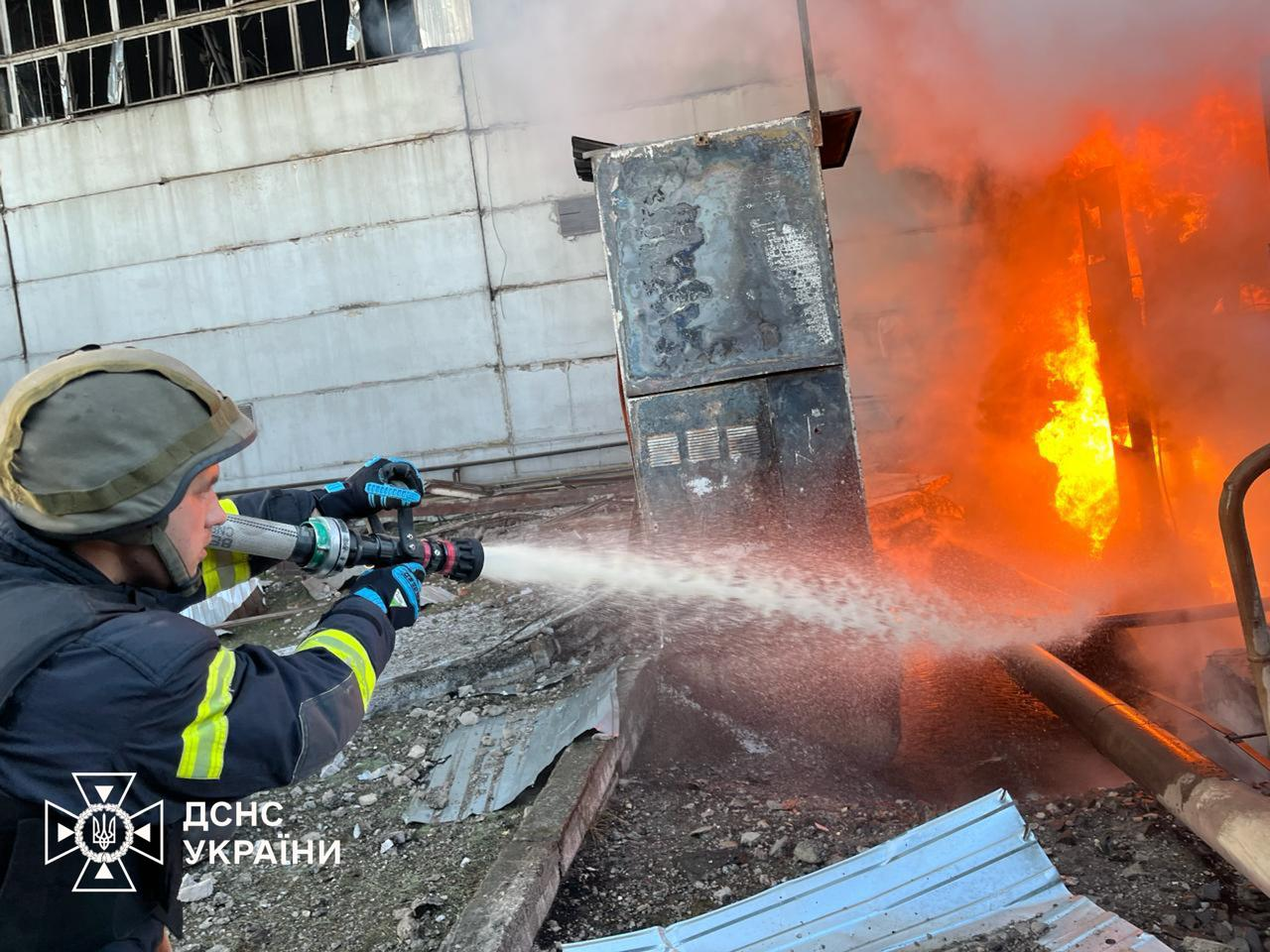
A Ukrainian firefighter extinguishing a fire at the Trypilska thermal power plant in Kyiv Oblast following a Russian missile attack on 11 April 2024.

During the Russo-Ukrainian war winter attacks on district heating and electricity in Ukraine caused crises for energy in Ukraine.

The situation created significant challenges during the 2024 winter season, with the country's generating capacity severely compromised and facing widespread blackouts, leading to difficulties in heating Ukrainian households as well as further economic challenges to the nation. The crisis was referred to by energy and geopolitical experts as one of the most severe disruptions to a national power system in recent history.

In 2026 Russia attempted to fragment the electricity grid to disrupt military supply and maintenance.

Russia has launched waves of missile and drone strikes against energy in Ukraine as part of its invasion. From 2022 the strikes targeted civilian areas beyond the battlefield, particularly critical power infrastructure, which is considered a war crime. By mid-2024 the country only had a third of pre-war electricity generating capacity, and some gas distribution and district heating had been hit.

On 10 October 2022 Russia attacked the power grid throughout Ukraine, including in Kyiv, with a wave of 84 cruise missiles and 24 loitering munitions. Further waves struck Ukrainian infrastructure, killing and injuring many, and seriously affecting energy distribution across Ukraine and neighboring countries. By 19 November, nearly half of the country's power grid was out of commission, and 10 million Ukrainians were without electricity, according to Ukrainian president Volodymyr Zelenskyy. By mid-December, Russia had fired more than 1,000 missiles and drones at Ukraine's energy grid. Several waves targeted Kyiv, including one on 16 May 2023 in which Ukraine said it had intercepted six Kinzhal missiles. During the first four years of the war, Russia launched approximately 12,700 drones and 2,900 missiles against Ukrainian energy infrastructure.

Deliberately depriving Ukrainians of electricity and heating during the cold winter months was the biggest attack on a nation's health since World War II. The attacks on power stations inflicted large economic and practical costs on Ukraine. The UK Defense Ministry said the strikes were intended to demoralize the population and force the Ukrainian leadership to capitulate. This is widely deemed to have failed.

The strikes were condemned by Western groups, with the European Commission describing them as "barbaric" and NATO secretary general Jens Stoltenberg calling them "horrific and indiscriminate". President Zelenskyy described the strikes as "absolute evil" and "terrorism". The International Criminal Court (ICC) indicted four Russian officials for alleged war crimes connected with attacks against civilian infrastructure, including former minister of defence Sergei Shoigu and Chief of the General Staff Valery Gerasimov.

On 31 January 2026, further emergency power cuts occurred in several Ukrainian and Moldovan cities, caused by a technical malfunction in the powerlines connecting the 2 countries according to Denys Shmyhal.

=== Reconstruction financing ===
International financing commitments totalling $8.5 billion through multilateral development banks prioritise emergency generation capacity and transmission grid stabilisation. The European Bank for Reconstruction and Development's €3.1 billion programme leads coordinated donor support, with the World Bank-European Commission-United Nations assessment quantifying direct infrastructure losses at $10.4 billion through Q4 2024. Private sector investment focuses on industrial self-generation and behind-the-meter solar installations, supported by political risk insurance and first-loss guarantees. NEURC Resolution 485 provides 15-year feed-in tariff guarantees at €0.088/kWh for solar and €0.103/kWh for wind generation.

== Demand ==
Demand peaks in very cold weather, for example at 18 GW in winter 25/26. More flexible demand, such as electric vehicles and heat pumps, could help smooth peaks.

== Generation ==
In 2024 Russia put 9 GW of capacity out of action. Ukrenergo has suggested that hundreds of small power plants should be built to enhance energy security.

=== Nuclear ===
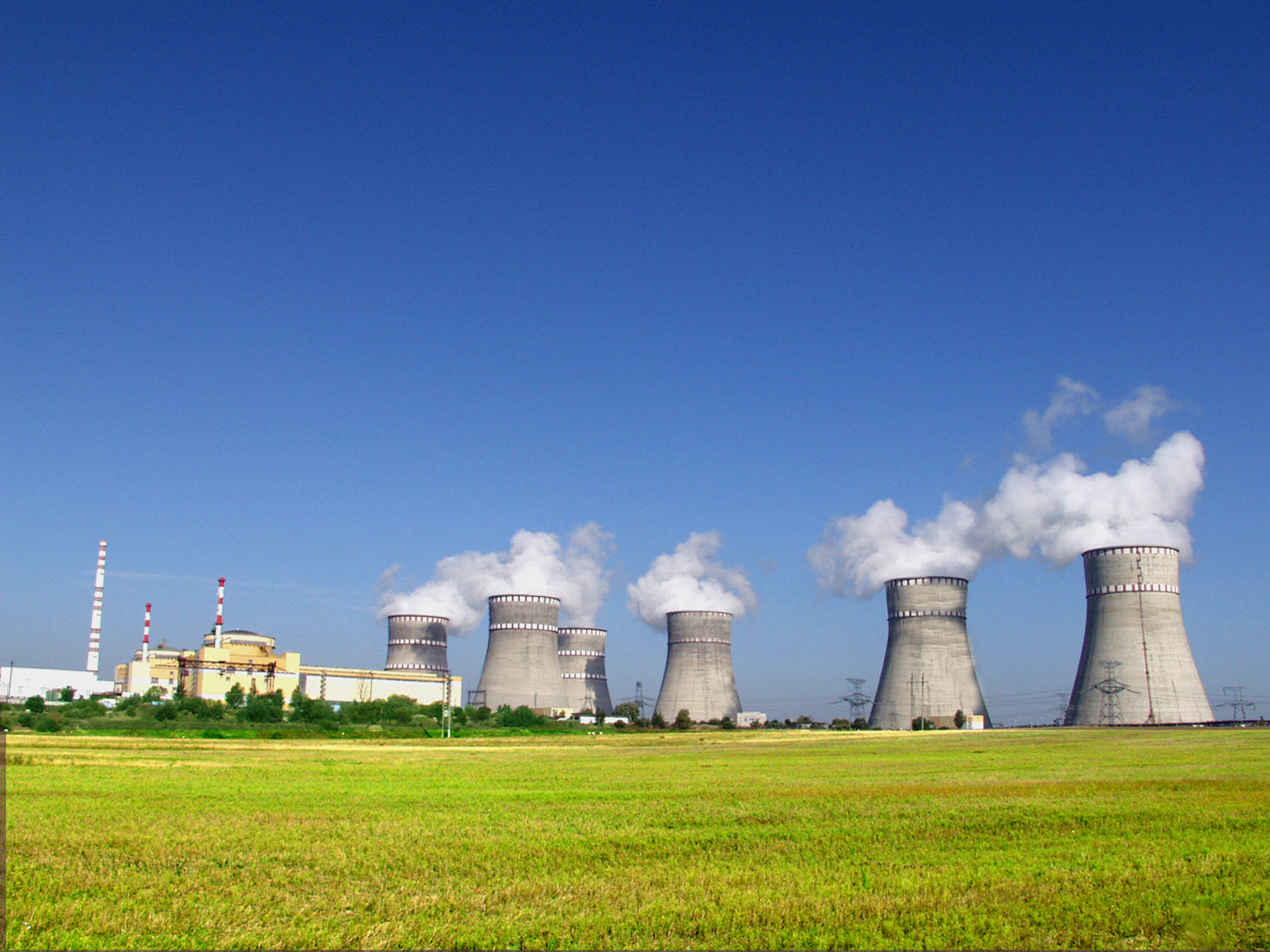
Rivne Nuclear Power Plant

There are four nuclear power plants in Ukraine but one of them, Zaporizhzhia, is now occupied and claimed by Russia and shutdown. The 15 reactors total installed capacity is over 13 GWe. Energoatom, a Ukrainian state enterprise, is the operator. Ukraine is one of the very few countries where nuclear power supplies most of its electricity.

Zaporizhzhia is the largest nuclear power plant in Europe, and Russia wants Rosatom to restart it.

The 1986 Chernobyl disaster in northern Ukraine was the world's most severe nuclear accident to date. It occurred at the Chernobyl Nuclear Power Plant on the banks of the Dnieper.

Lack of coal for Ukraine's coal-fired power stations due to the war in Donbas and a shut down of one of the six reactors of the Zaporizhzhia Nuclear Power Plant led to rolling blackouts throughout the country in December 2014. Due to the Russo-Ukrainian War, the nuclear power plant has been damaged.

Electricity production by source, Ukraine

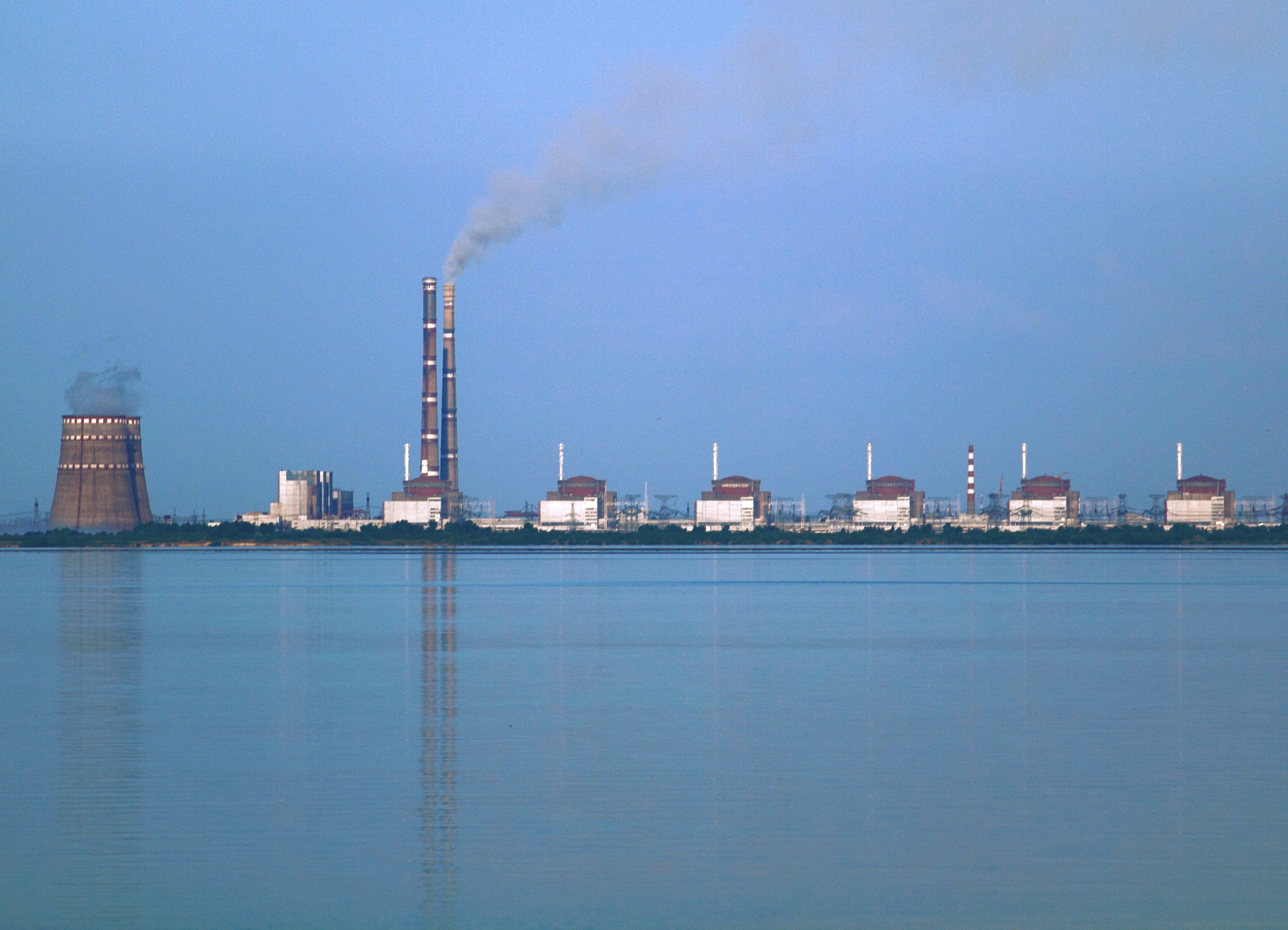
Zaporizhzhia Nuclear Power Plant is Europe's largest with six reactors whose total capacity is 6 GW.

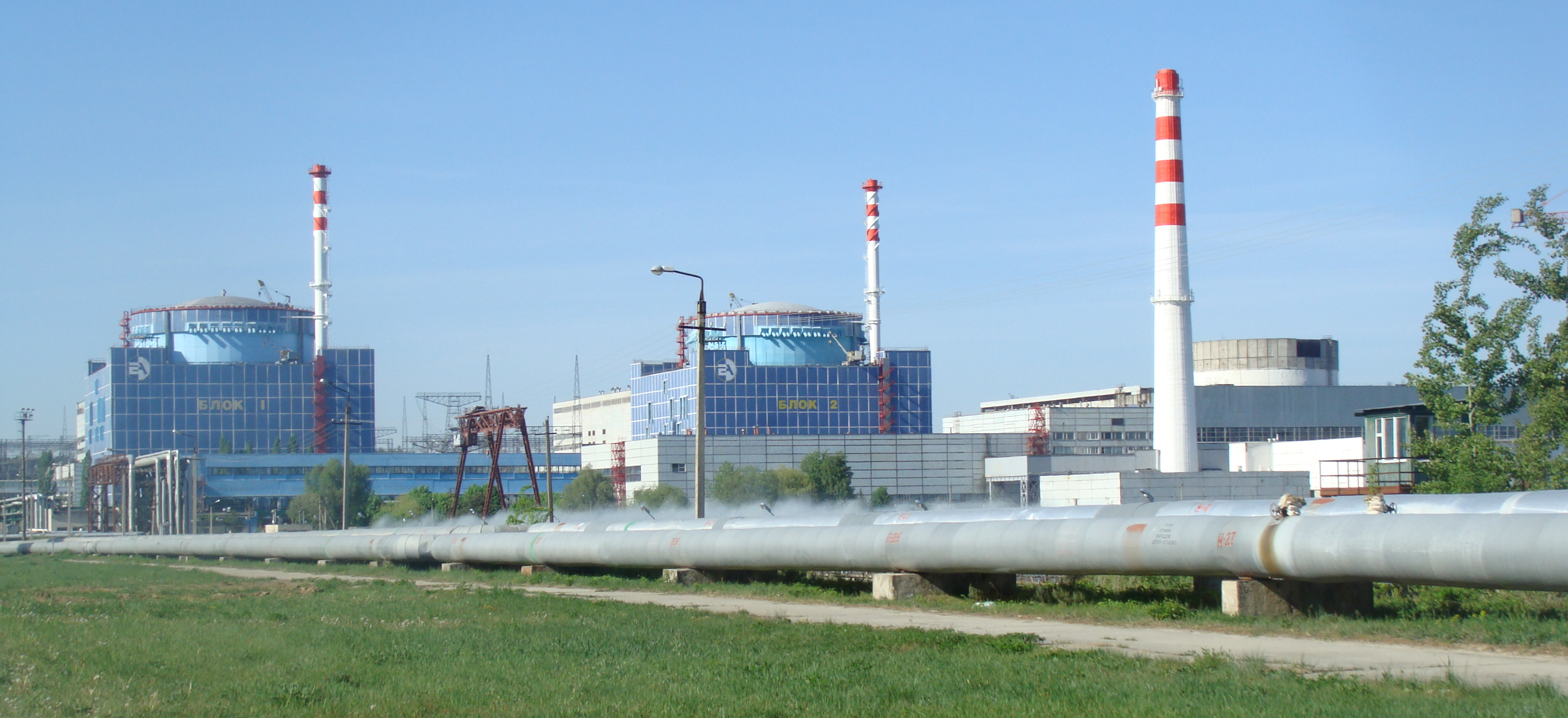
Khmelnytskyi NPP

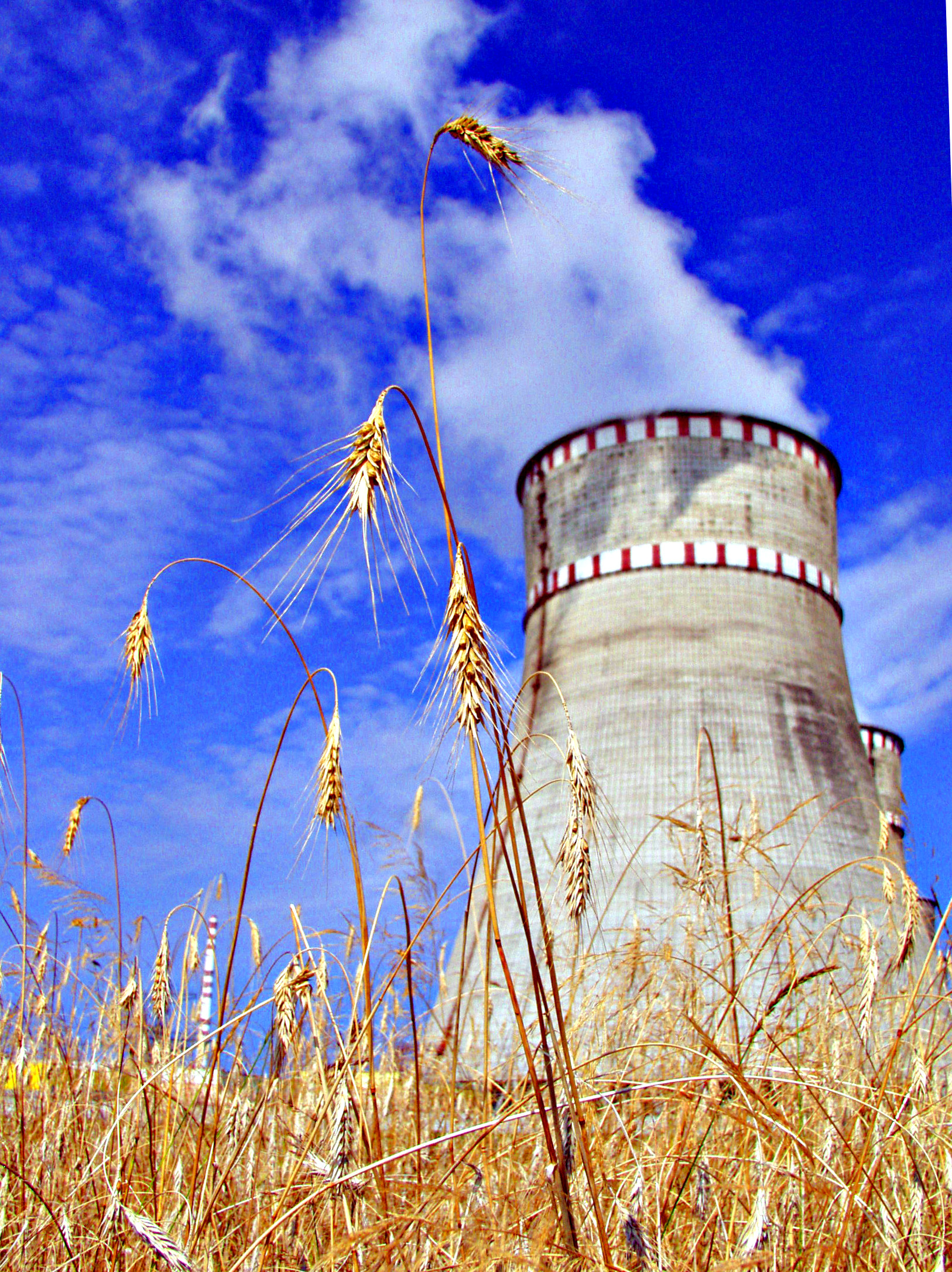
Rivne NPP

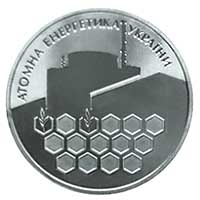
Ukrainian coin commemorating nuclear power

Ukraine relies to a large extent on nuclear power. The largest nuclear power plant in Europe, the Zaporizhzhia Nuclear Power Plant, is located in Ukraine. In 2006, the government planned to build 11 new reactors by the year 2030, which would have almost doubled the current amount of nuclear power capacity.

=== Hydro ===
Hydropower is part of renewable energy in Ukraine. Ukraine is trying to build more small hydroelectric plants as sources of electricity in Ukraine. State operating company is Ukrhydroenergo. About half of hydro capacity of power stations in Ukraine has been destroyed in the Russian invasion of Ukraine, including the Kakhovka Hydroelectric Power Plant. Defence against drones is important. Design of main power plants is carried out by Ukrhydroproject.

=== Gas ===
Many small gas-turbine generators are used, as these are more difficult to attack than large gas-fired or coal-fired power plants. Up to 700 MW of gas peakers may be installed before 2030.

== System services ==
Batteries provide system services.

== International trade ==
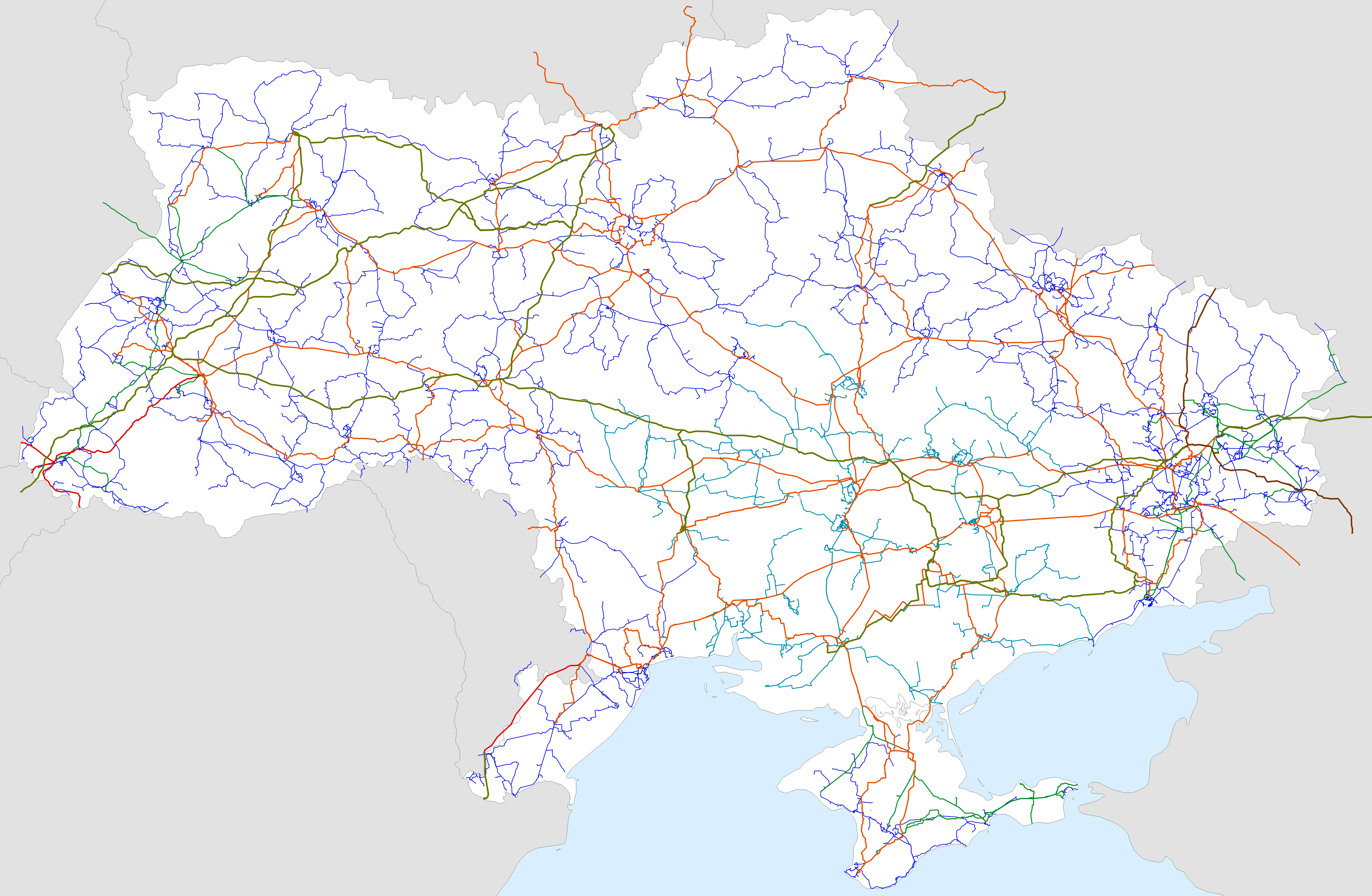
Grid

Normally Ukraine is a net exporter (for example in summer 2025), but imports in winter because demand increases and Russia damages the system. About 2.5 GW can flow with neighbouring countries. In 2025 this capacity was rarely fully used, likely due to technical difficulties in Ukraine’s grid and import price caps. In January 2026 the price cap was increased to 15,000 UAH/MWh (16,000 for balancing).

There is a 750 kV link with Hungary. Rzeszów–Khmelnytskyi powerline connects Poland at 750 kV. Vetrino–Isaccea–Yuzhnoukrainsk powerline connects Romania at 750 kV. It has been suggested that the 220 kV link with Poland be improved and that interconnection with Slovakia be built sooner. There are five 110 kV interconnections with Moldova, but they could be better used.

The IEA says that capacity limits on links from neighbouring countries should be increased.

== Storage, transmission, distribution and resiliance ==
The IEA says that more decentralised generation and batteries should be installed for energy security. They recommend more off-grid and mini-grid. Both transmission and distribution have been attacked, and shelters have been built to protect substations from attack. Resilience includes restoring power quickly and limiting problems caused by outages: making grids smarter can help.

Due to the large share of fixed-production nuclear, balancing the grid is particularly difficult during peak demand, which is in the morning and evening due to retail demand. Peak demand can reach 18 GW in winter, or 19 in cold winters.

DTEK is building more storage, to improve ancillary services such as frequency control. Grid batteries with 200 MW power and 400 MWh energy were operating in 2025. There is a reserve stockpile of transformers.

Local generation, such as rooftop solar, and batteries can continue to supply some critical facilities, such as hospitals, when grid connection is lost. Microgrids have been made.

== Power system reforms ==
The IEA has published a roadmap for Ukraine's increased use of distributed energy resources (DERs) towards 2030 which says:

"Scaling up DERs requires robust financial incentives, while maintaining affordability and equity as core priorities. This involves two key elements: First, market design must enable broader participation of small-scale and distributed resources, such as batteries and small gas turbines, in wholesale electricity and ancillary services markets. Second, consumer tariffs should be structured to incentivise efficient electricity consumption, the deployment of behind-the-meter DERs like rooftop solar and batteries, and the operation of these resources in ways that deliver system-wide benefits."

== Economics ==
In 2024 the price to householders was said to be about half the market price, and it has been suggested that to encourage energy saving and energy efficiency the subsidy should only apply to energy poor households and/or a certain minimum consumption.

DTEK has started installing smart meters. Central and city government is subsidizing rooftop solar installation. NEURC hopes to implement dynamic pricing so the price can be changed throughout the day.
