= Solar power in Ukraine =

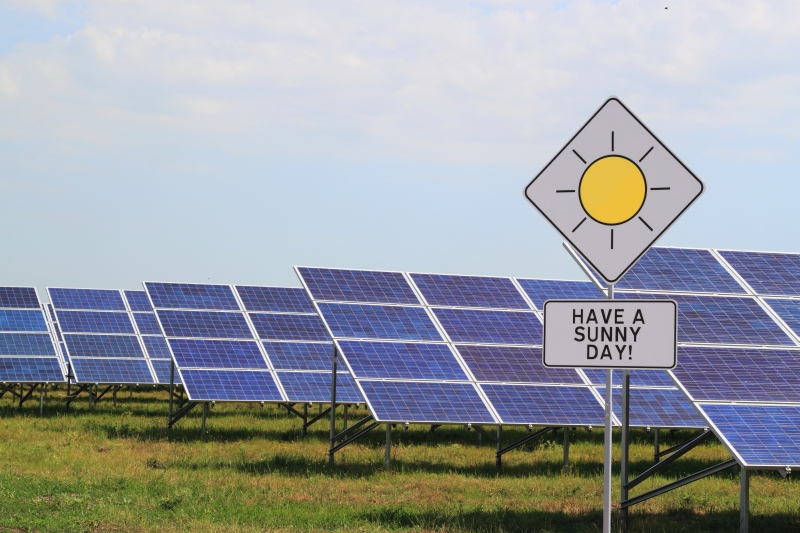
Dunayska solar station in 2013

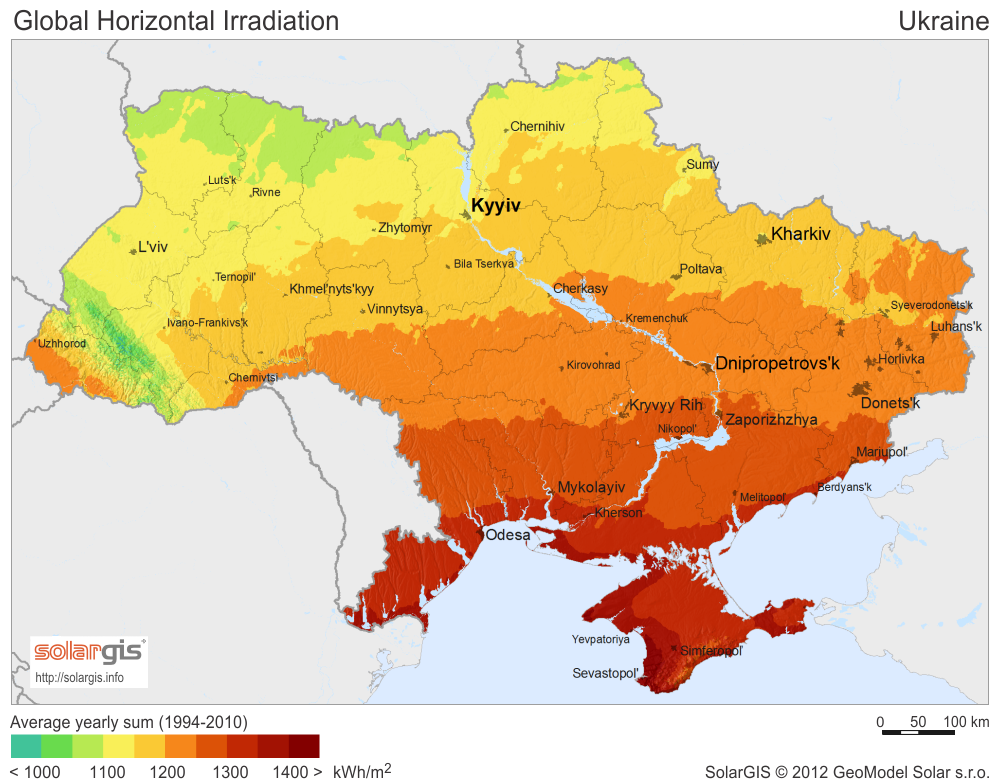
Solar potential in Ukraine

More distributed solar power in Ukraine is urgently needed to secure electricity in Ukraine, according to the IEA.

During the 2022 Russian invasion of Ukraine, the Merefa solar energy plant in the Kharkiv region was destroyed by Russia; damage was also reported at the Tokmak solar energy plant in the Zaporizhia region. Solar and wind power in Ukraine could be greatly expanded to meet much of the country’s electricity demand.

== History ==
In 1985 there was SPP-5 (SES-5, 5MW), the first and last built solar station in Soviet Union, near the town of Shcholkine in Crimea. It was stopped in the 1990s and demolished afterwards.

In 2011, 90% of electricity came from nuclear and coal. In order to reduce this, Ukraine adopted a feed-in tariff (FIT) which was one of the highest in the world - UAH 5.0509 (EUR 0.46) per kWh. Europe's largest solar park at the time, the 100 MW Perove Solar Park (now overtaken by Nikopol solar park), was completed at the end of 2011.

In 2019 DTEK inaugurated a 240 MW solar plant in Ukraine.

The government announced in the law on green auctions, adopted in April 2019, that the feed-in tariffs would be replaced by an auction based quota system coming in force in 2020 for all solar PV systems greater than 1 MW, which if applied effectively could facilitate a larger and sustainable solar development in the country. Households in 2020 were still able to obtain a green FIT tariff for systems up to 50 kW in size, which can be either rooftop or ground mounted solar systems.

== Installed capacity ==
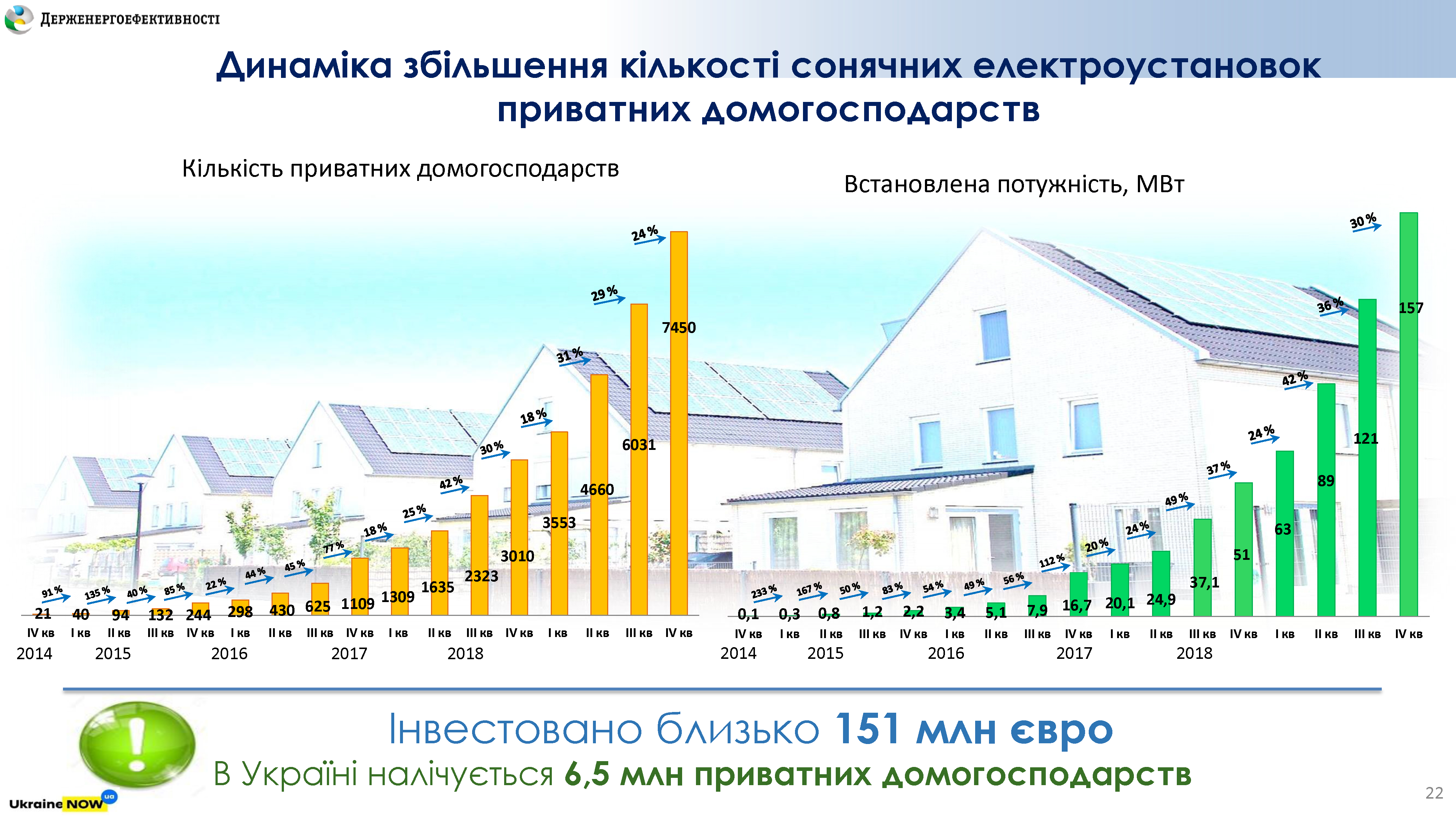
Domestic PV installations in Ukraine

The latest information about installed solar energy capacity in Ukraine is kept up to date by the national power company Ukrenergo.

- 407,9 MW SPP is in the occupied territory of the Crimea.

History of photovoltaic deployment
| Year | Σ Installed (MWp) | Δ Installed (MWp) | Generation (GWh) | Refs |
|---|---|---|---|---|
| 2010 | 3 | 3 | n.a. | |
| 2011 | 196 | 193 | n.a. | |
| 2012 | 326 | 130 | n.a. | |
| 2013 | 616 | 290 | 563 | |
| 2014 | 411 | 71 | 485 | |
| 2015 | 432 | 20 | 475 | |
| 2016 | 568 | 99 | 492 | |
| 2017 | 742 | 245 | 715 | |
| 2018 | 1388 | 716 | 1,101 | |
| 2019 | 4925 | 3537 | 2,412 | |
| 2020 | 6320 | 1395 | | |

== Rooftop solar power ==
Solar on residential rooftops is popular for saving on electricity bills, which rose in the mid-2020s. Solar is also suitable for many small and medium-sized enterprises. At the beginning of 2022 there was 1.2 GW of household solar, of which it is estimated 280 MW had been destroyed by the end of 2024. The IEA estimate that if all (excluding north-facing) roofs had panels 290 TWh could be generated.

Households in Ukraine tend on average to have larger rooftop solar PV systems than in other countries. The feed-in tariff is available for larger systems and from 2020 may be up to 50 kW and can be both rooftop or ground mounted. In March 2019 the power of residential solar was an average of 21.5 kW per family.

By Q3 2019 the total installed capacity of installed solar in households was 280 MW, a 100 fold increase on 2015 levels, and the investment of households in solar energy amounted to EUR 240 million. The largest residential solar systems in 2019 were installed in households in Dnipro, Ternopil and Kyiv regions (including Kyiv). These three regions account for more than a third of all households using solar energy.

== Large scale solar power parks ==
| Name | MW | Location |
|---|---|---|
| Okhotnykove Solar Park (Crimea) | 82.65 | 45°14′20″N 33°35′34″E |
| Perove Solar Park (Crimea) | 100 | 44°55′N 34°02′E |
| Starokozache Solar Park | 42.95 | 46°28′N 30°44′E |
| Nikopol Solar Park | 246 | |
| Dunayska Solar Park | 43.14 | |
| Lymanske Solar Park | 43.4 | |
| Solar Chornobyl | 100 | |
| Pokrovske Solar Park | 240 | |

In the spring of 2024, solar helped the country to export power during the daytime.

== Economics ==
In 2019, changes were announced to the Ukrainian energy market operations that have significant impacts on the growth and operation of large scale solar facilities in Ukraine. These include a new generous feed-in-tariff scheme and the requirement for solar energy facilities to provide their own energy generation forecasts.

The head of the Ukrainian Association of Renewable Energy, writing in 2024, said that solar farms were no longer profitable because they were being curtailed so much to stabilise the grid. He said that the grid could be made more stable by improving interconnection with other ENTSO-E countries.

== Resilience ==
Although solar farms have been attacked, they are generally more resilient than large gas and coal-fired power stations, as damaged panels and transformers can be quickly replaced. However, all solar farms in the Kharkiv region are said to have been destroyed.

== See also ==
- Biofuel in Ukraine
- Geothermal power in Ukraine
- Hydroelectricity in Ukraine
- Wind power in Ukraine
- Renewable energy in Ukraine
