= Geothermal energy in Ukraine =

Geothermal energy in Ukraine is mostly heat, but electricity generation has substantial potential for further development. There is about 7 MWt of geothermal heating of communal buildings and baths in Ukraine with this continuing in an upward trend following a lack of reported geothermal data from 2005–2020. Commercial use of heat pumps as well as balneological purposes can be directly linked to the growth of this number. As of 2023 there is no geothermal electricity generation in Ukraine. Despite this, there has been initiative to examine the prospective capabilities of this region and results have demonstrated that there are locations proven to be adequate for further development.

== Potential ==
Ukraine has considerable geothermal resources that can be used mainly for heat supply. There are also prospects for binary geothermal power plant initiatives based on existing wells at abandoned oil and gas fields.

Ukraine has a good potential for the development of geothermal energy. This is due to thermogeological features of the relief and features of the geothermal resources of the country. Along with this, Ukraine hosts a feed-in-tariff for geothermal energy and legal framework decreases taxes of imported geothermal equipment. However, at present, scientific, geological, exploratory and practical work in Ukraine is concentrated only on the geothermal resources that are represented by thermal waters. According to various estimates, the economically expedient energy resource of thermal waters of Ukraine is up to 8.4 million tons of oil equivalent per year. This can also be equated to an estimated 4.38x10^6 kWh/year of energy potential.

Geothermal power's usage can be tracked back to its initiation in the 70s. Practical development of thermal waters in Ukraine was carried out in the temporarily occupied territory of the Autonomous Republic of Crimea, where 11 geothermal circulating systems were constructed, using modern technologies for the extraction of geothermal heat from the earth.

Large reserves of thermal waters were also found on the territory of Chernihiv, Poltava, Kharkiv, Lugansk and Sumy regions. Hundreds of wells that have discovered thermal water and are in conservation can be restored for their further exploitation as a system for extracting geothermal heat. The highest potential for geothermal energy is primarily concentrated in the east, west, and south regions of Ukraine. There is a medium-level geothermal gradient that Ukraine exhibits which proceeds from west to east with the western-most regions being the most promising for geothermal potential. Most of the promising regions in Ukraine lay upon tectonically unique locations that all have depressions leading to promising geothermal potential. Other notable conditions that cause areas of Ukraine to be geothermally promising are areas previously used to extract gas, low density condensate, and oil in some cases as these are generally filled with water during operation.

In 2023, Geosciences Barcelona hosted a conference detailing a report titled "Future of Geothermal Energy in Ukraine". The GEO3BCN report concluded that Ukraine has a surfeit of geothermal resources already present. If properly taken advantage of it is expected that 90 billion kWh/year can be harnessed which is the equivalent to 10 billion cubic meters of gas.

The technical and economic analysis showed that on the basis of the Dnipro-Donetsk depression oil and gas wells it is possible to construct geothermal power plants with depths of drilling or disclosing wells up to 3 – 4.5 km. At such depths, the 90% thermal potential of geothermal waters in productive oil and gas horizons of сarboniferous deposits does not exceed 108 °C. In this case, the replacement of organic fuel and electricity by the heat of geothermal waters and rocks is much more profitable for providing heat and heating (by 3 – 5 times). Two wells from the depth of сarboniferous deposits can provide 0.4 – 4.5 MW of thermal energy.

== Specific heat potentials regionally ==
In 2023 heat potentials were established by region in order to determine the most promising areas for geothermal development.

	Region	Heat Potential (MW)
1	Transcarpathian	490
2	Mykolaiv	2820
3	Odesa	2350
4	Poltava	9.2
5	Sumy	15.8
6	Kharkiv	1.3
7	Kherson	4230
8	Chernihiv	58.3
9	Crimea	37600

== See also ==
- Renewable energy in Ukraine
- Solar power in Ukraine
- Wind power in Ukraine
- Biofuel in Ukraine
- Hydroelectricity in Ukraine
- Renewable energy by country

== Sources ==
- Geothermal energy use, country update for Ukraine
