= D.TRADING =

Subsidiary of the energy holding company DTEK

- Type: Group of private companies
- Industry: Trading, Energy, Agribusiness
- Founded: 2019
- Headquarters: Kyiv, Ukraine
- Area served: Eastern Europe
- Key people: Dmytro Sakharuk (CEO)
- Owner: DTEK
- Website: d.trading

D.Trading is a group of companies within the DTEK energy holding, that engages in trading energy products, including electricity, gas, solid and liquid fuels, and renewable energy products in markets in 21 European countries and on 15 European exchanges. Since December 2023, the company also specializes in the export of agricultural products.

== History ==
=== 2019–2022: Establishment ===
D.Trading Group was established in late 2018 with the founding of a holding company in the Netherlands. In early 2019, the group launched its business operations in Ukraine.

In 2019, the company actively participated in developing and launching a new electricity market model in Ukraine, in line with the 2017 Electricity Market Law.

In July 2019, D.Trading started importing electricity from Europe to Ukraine.

In 2020–2021, the company started international expansion with the opening of offices in Switzerland and Croatia.

From 2020, D.Trading operated in Poland, Slovakia, and Hungary and became a major company in import-export operations within the electricity market.

=== 2022–2024 ===
From 2022 to 2024, D.Trading launched European market expansion, transferring some functions to its Croatian office.

In 2022, D.Trading began importing gas from Europe to Ukraine for storage under the customs warehouse (short-haul) regime, supporting Ukraine’s preparation for the winter season.

In October 2022, the company began trading renewable electricity in Ukraine, purchasing it from renewable energy producers.

In November 2022, D.Trading started supplying oil products to the Ukrainian market via imports from Europe.

In June 2023, D.Trading signed its first European Power Purchase Agreement (PPA) for purchasing renewable energy. That same month, it began trading energy Guarantees of Origin (GOs).

In 2024, D.Trading started trading grain, completing its first domestic deal and sending its first export shipment. The company also launched an agricultural division based in Odesa.

In June 2024, D.Trading and U.S.-based Venture Global announced a comprehensive Heads of Terms Agreement for supplying American liquefied natural gas (LNG) to Ukraine and Eastern Europe. That same month, D.Trading and Germany’s SEFE (Securing Energy for Europe GmbH) signed an agreement to strengthen European energy security by exploring projects aimed at advancing the continent’s energy independence.

== Areas of activity ==
=== Electricity ===
2023 supply volume: 34.6 GWh

D.Trading is the major electricity supplier in Ukraine, engaging in the purchase and sale of electricity both domestically and in Europe, supplying end-users, trading, and exchange activities in Ukraine and Europe. The company is Ukraine’s largest electricity importer and operates one of the largest balancing groups in the country.

=== Agricultural exports ===
D.Trading exports agricultural products from Ukraine.

== Geographic presence ==
D.Trading companies are registered in Ukraine, Switzerland, Croatia, and the Netherlands. Countries with a physical presence (offices/branches) include Ukraine, Croatia, Switzerland, and the Netherlands. Countries where operational activities are conducted are Ukraine, Poland, Hungary, Croatia, Slovakia, Romania, Germany, Netherlands, Italy, Spain, Montenegro, Bulgaria, Austria, Greece, Serbia, Bosnia, North Macedonia, Slovenia, Moldova, Albania, France

== Structure and management ==
D.Trading is an international trading group active in most Central and Eastern European markets, with its primary focus on Ukraine, giving rise to two management structures: Ukrainian and European.

Between 2022 and 2024, Dmytro Maliar headed the trading division in Ukraine, while Peter Dvorak managed European operations. Ivan Helukh serves as the Chair of the Board of Directors, responsible for the strategic development of D.Trading and coordination across the group’s various businesses.

In October 2024, Dmytro Sakharuk was appointed CEO of D.Trading, overseeing both Ukrainian and European divisions.
