= Wind power in Ukraine =

Wind power in Ukraine is mostly in areas affected by the Russo-Ukrainian War. At the end of 2021 there was 1.7 gigawatts (GW) capacity of electricity in Ukraine was wind power. In 2024 the IEA suggested installing 11 GW more by 2030.

== History ==
By the end of 2017, 505 MW of wind power plants had been launched in Ukraine, with 138 MW remaining in the occupied territory of Donetsk and Luhansk regions, and another 87.8 MW left in occupied Crimea.

As of March 2019, 8 wind farms were being built in Ukraine with a total capacity of almost 1 GW. This is Ovid Wind (Odesa Oblast) - 87 MW; Black Sea WPP (Mykolaiv Oblast) - 70 MW; Prymorska WPP (Zaporizhia Oblast) - 200 MW; Overianivska (Kherson Oblast) - 70 MW; Kramatorsk WPP (Donetsk Oblast) - 70 MW; Orlivska WPP (Zaporizhia Oblast) - 100 MW; WES Sivash (Kherson Oblast) - 250 MW; Dnipro-Bug WPP (Kherson Oblast) - 110 MW. The 114 MW Tylihulska park was under construction near Mykolaiv in early 2023.

== Resilience ==
One GW was planned to be added in 2022, but the Russian invasion stalled development. Wind farms are more resilient to attack than large gas and coal-fired power stations, because they are spread over a larger area so many more missiles are needed to destroy them. Before the war, Ukraine had around 55 GW of power station capacity, mainly coal, nuclear and gas. By 2024, Russian missiles and takeovers had reduced this to 20 GW. Of the 700 wind turbines in Ukraine, Russian drones damaged 11, including a 4 MW turbine in the 40 MW Dnistrovska wind farm in January 2024. The country's only wind turbine manufacturer moved 1,500 km from the frontline to the western border in 2022.

== Potential ==
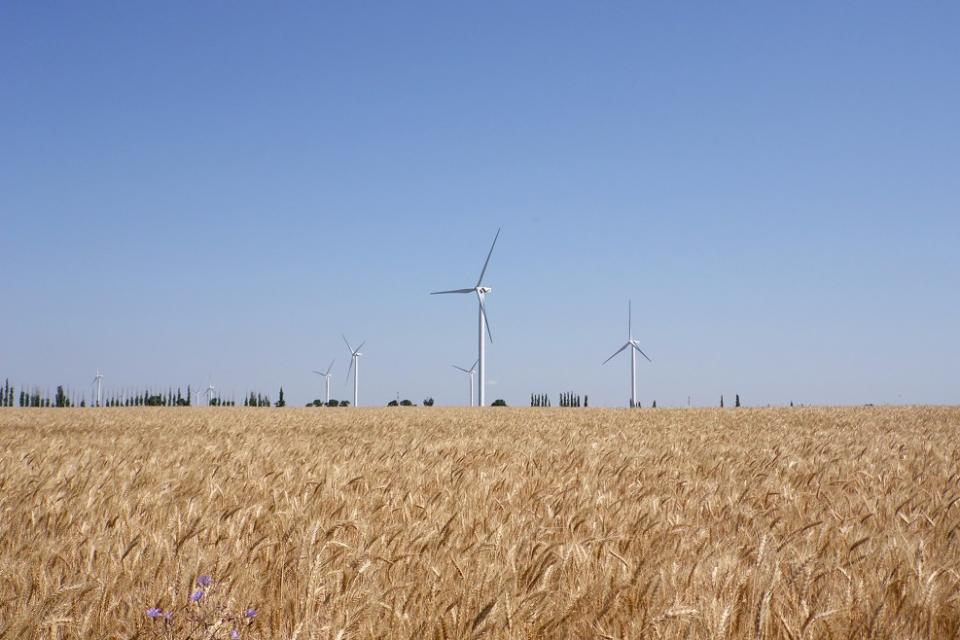
Near the coast east of Odesa

The coasts of the Black and Azov Seas, the mountainous regions of the Crimean peninsula (especially the north-eastern coast) and the Carpathians, Odesa, Kherson, Zaporizhzhia, Donetsk, Luhansk and Mykolaiv regions are the most suitable for the construction of wind power plants.

Ukraine has a rather high climatic potential of wind power, which provides productive work not only of autonomous power units, but also of powerful wind power plants. The interest in exploring the most promising places for using wind energy is growing, based on its climatic potential and indicators of its possible utilization. According to the Global wind energy council, about 40% of the areas are suitable for wind power generation. In the medium term, it is possible to develop about 5,000 MW of wind energy, that is, 20-30% of total electricity consumption in the country. In 1996, the government announced a strategy for the construction of 200 MW of wind power by 2010, but by the end of 2011, only 151 MW were put into operation.

== Capacity ==
- 225.8 MW of WPP in the occupied by Russia territory of the Crimea and Donetsk and Luhansk regions.

Wind power capacities (MWp)
2010	2011	2012	2013	2014	2015	2016	2017	2018	2019	2020	2021	2022	2023	2024
87	151	194	334	426/651.8	426	438	465	533	1,170	1,314	1,672.8		1,900.8	

== List of wind farms ==
- Botievska wind power plant - 200 MWp
- Zaporizhzhia wind power plant - 500 MWp
- Kramatorsk wind farm - 67,5 MWp
- Prymorska wind farm - 200 MWp
- Tylihul Wind Power Plant - 565 MWp
- Novoazovska wind farm - 107,5 MWp
- Krasnodon Wind Farm - 25 MWp
- Syvash wind farm - 246 MWp
- Orlivska Wind Power Plant - 100 MWp
- Dnistrovska Wind Power Plant - 100 MWp

== See also ==
- Wind power by country
- Solar power in Ukraine
- Biofuel in Ukraine
- Geothermal power in Ukraine
- Hydroelectricity in Ukraine
- Renewable energy in Ukraine

== Sources ==
- NBT builds EUR 370 million large-scale wind farm in Ukraine
- "Norway builds large-scale wind farm in Ukraine". neweurope.eu. Archived from the original on September 7, 2018.
- Ukraine’s most powerful wind turbines now produced 45 km away from the front line
