= Perovo Solar Park =

Photovoltaic power station in Crimea

Perove Solar Park Perovo Solar Park
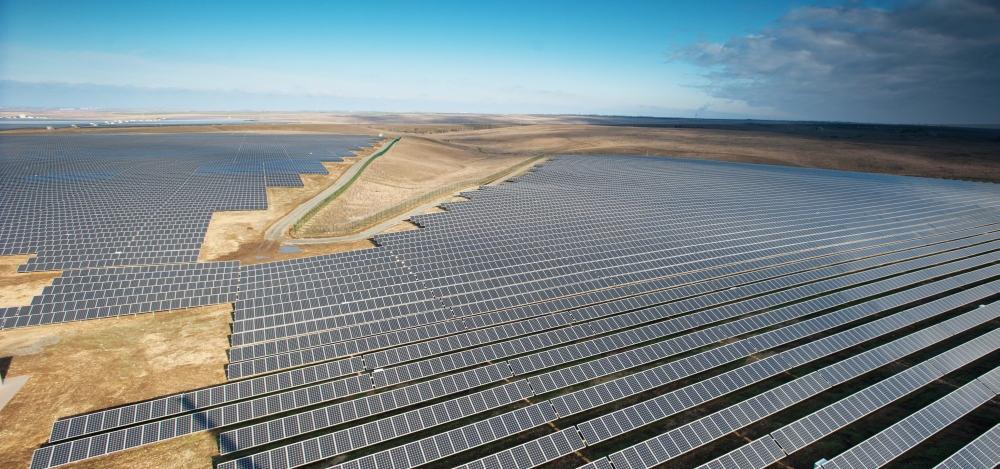
- Official name: СЕС «Перове»
- Country: Disputed: Ukraine (de jure); Russia (de facto)
- Location: Klyuchi, Perove Settlement Council, Crimea
- Coordinates: 44°57′28″N 33°55′37″E
- Status: Operational

Solar farm
- Type: Flat-panel PV
- Site area: 200 ha (494 acres) 200 ha (2 km^{2})

Power generation
- Units operational: 440,000
- Nameplate capacity: 100 MW
- Annual net output: 132.5 GWh

The Perovo Solar Park (Russian: СЭС «Перово») or Perove Solar Park (Ukrainian: СЕС «Перове», romanized: SES Perove) is a 100 MWp photovoltaic power station located at Klyuchi — a part of Perove, Simferopol Raion, Crimea, Ukraine. As of July 2012, it was the world's fourth-largest solar farm, and was made up of 440,000 solar panels. It is owned by Activ Solar, and the final 20 MW stage was completed on December 29, 2011.

In 2009, Ukraine established a feed-in tariff of €0.46 per kilowatt-hour until 2030, one of the highest.

As of January 2012, the Perove Solar Park was the most powerful solar power plant in the world, with 100 MW capacity. At that time, it was followed by the Canadian Sunny Power Plant "Sarnia" at 97 MW, the Italian Montalto Di O at 84.2 MW, and the German Finsterwalde at 80.7 MW.

The park consists of 440,000 crystalline solar photovoltaic modules, connected by 1,500 km of cable and installed on more than 200 hectares of area (covers approximately 259 football fields).

Electricity produced by this plant was sufficient to meet the needs of the city of Simferopol in 2012. The total capacity of all solar power plants in the territory of the Crimea: "Perove", "Okhotnykove", "Mityayeve" and "Rodnykove", was 227.26 MW, which was more than 15 percent of the total energy needs of all Crimea, which was 1200 MW at that time.

The new power station surpassed the five previous world largest photovoltaic parks. Perove Solar Park was built in seven months. The power plants used solar panels of Asian manufacturers and inverters of European companies.

== Occupation and subsequent annexation by Russia ==
Before the occupation of Crimea by Russia, the substation was integrated into the grid power distribution system of Ukraine. After the occupation by Russia, the plant started supplying energy to the Crimean Peninsula.

This plant, like a number of other solar farm projects, received loans from a group of banks that hoped to make a profit from investments through a special "green tariff" that was established by the Ukrainian Government. However, due to cheap electricity from Russia and lack of current subsidy, the stations are unprofitable. Now, only part of their power is used. The plant tried to get a green tariff in the Russian Federation.

== See also ==
- List of photovoltaic power stations
