= Russian strikes on Ukraine =

Russian strikes on Ukraine may refer to these airstrikes during the Russian invasion of Ukraine:

- By Ukrainian oblasts:
  - Chernihiv strikes (2022–present)
  - Dnipropetrovsk
    - Dnipro strikes (2022–present)
    - Kryvyi Rih strikes (2022–present)
  - Ivano-Frankivsk strikes (2022–present)
  - Kharkiv strikes (2022–present)
  - Kherson strikes (2022–present)
  - Khmelnytskyi strikes (2022–present)
  - Kyiv strikes (2022–present)
  - Lviv strikes (2022–present)
  - Mykolaiv strikes (2022–present)
  - Odesa strikes (2022–present)
  - Rivne strikes (2022–present)
  - Vinnytsia strikes (2022–present)
  - Zaporizhzhia strikes (2022–present)
  - Zhytomyr attacks (2022–present)
- Russian strikes against Ukrainian infrastructure (2022–present)
- Russian strikes on hospitals during the Russian invasion of Ukraine
- 29 December 2023 Russian strikes on Ukraine
- 22 March 2024 Russian strikes on Ukraine
- 8 July 2024 Russian strikes on Ukraine
- 26 August 2024 Russian strikes on Ukraine
- 17 November 2024 Russian strikes on Ukraine
