= Ukrainian energy crisis =

Infrastructure crisis due to Russian attacks

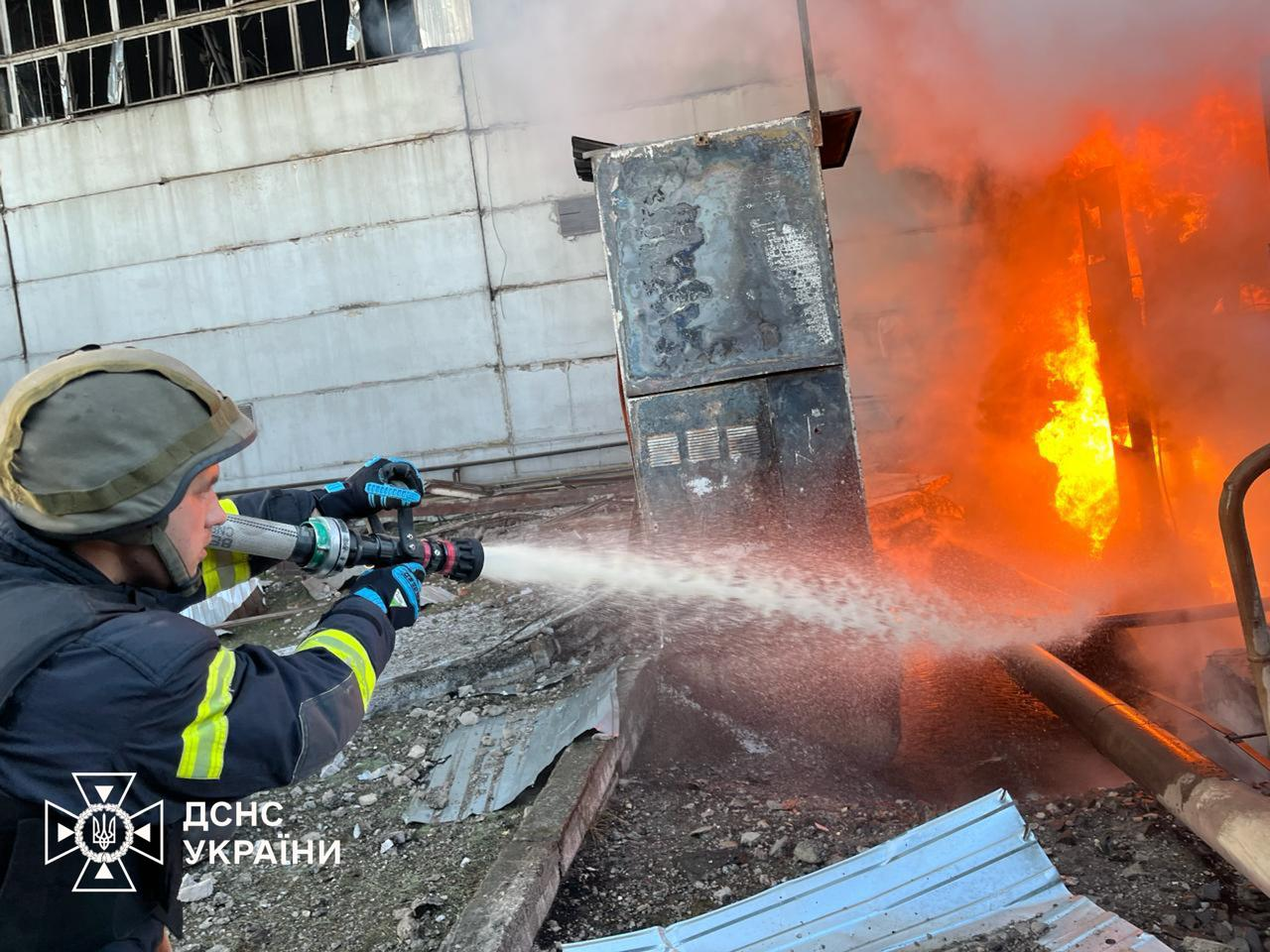
A Ukrainian firefighter extinguishing a fire at the Trypilska thermal power plant in Kyiv Oblast following a Russian missile attack on 11 April 2024.

During the Russo-Ukrainian war winter attacks on district heating and electricity in Ukraine caused crises for energy in Ukraine.

The situation created significant challenges during the 2024 winter season, with the country's generating capacity severely compromised and facing widespread blackouts, leading to difficulties in heating Ukrainian households as well as further economic challenges to the nation. The crisis was referred to by energy and geopolitical experts as one of the most severe disruptions to a national power system in recent history.

In 2026 Russia attempted to fragment the electricity grid to disrupt military supply and maintenance.

== Background ==
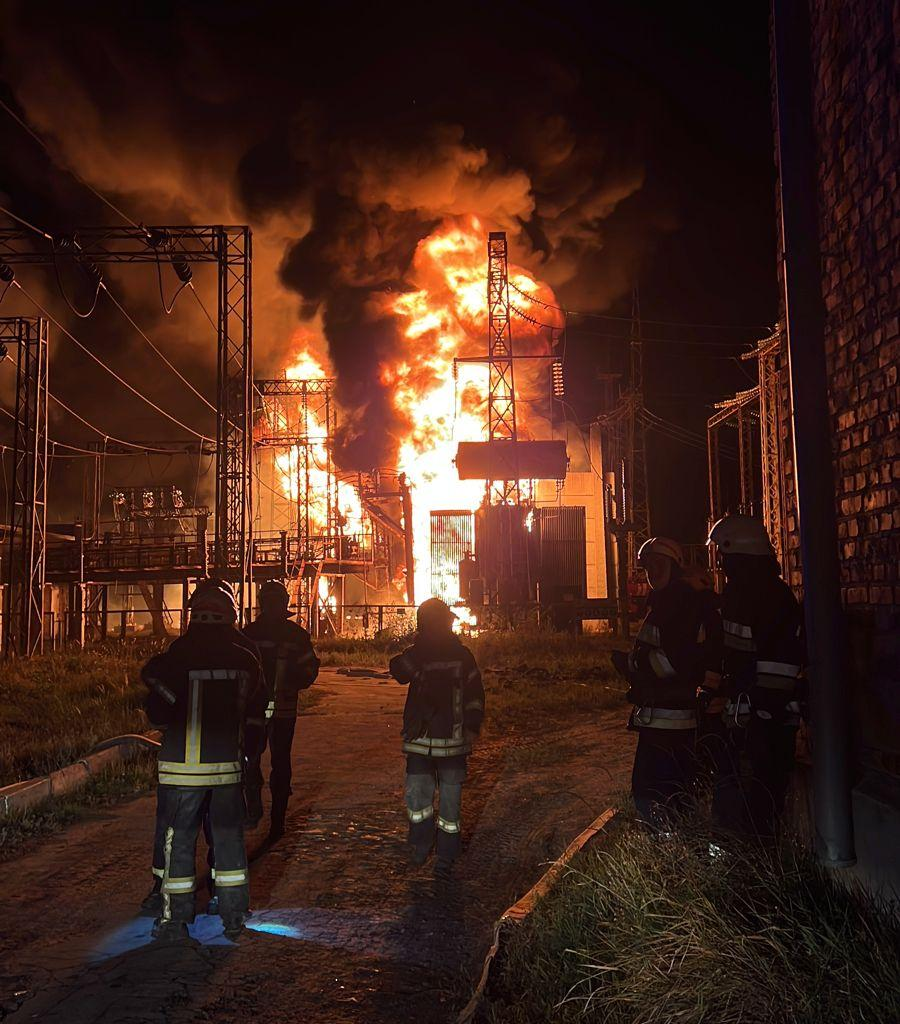
A fire at Kharkiv TEC-5 combined heat and power plant due to a Russian attack in 2022

In the winter of 2022–23 Russia targeted switchyards and transformers, but the following year they concentrated on power plants perhaps because they are harder to protect and take longer to repair.

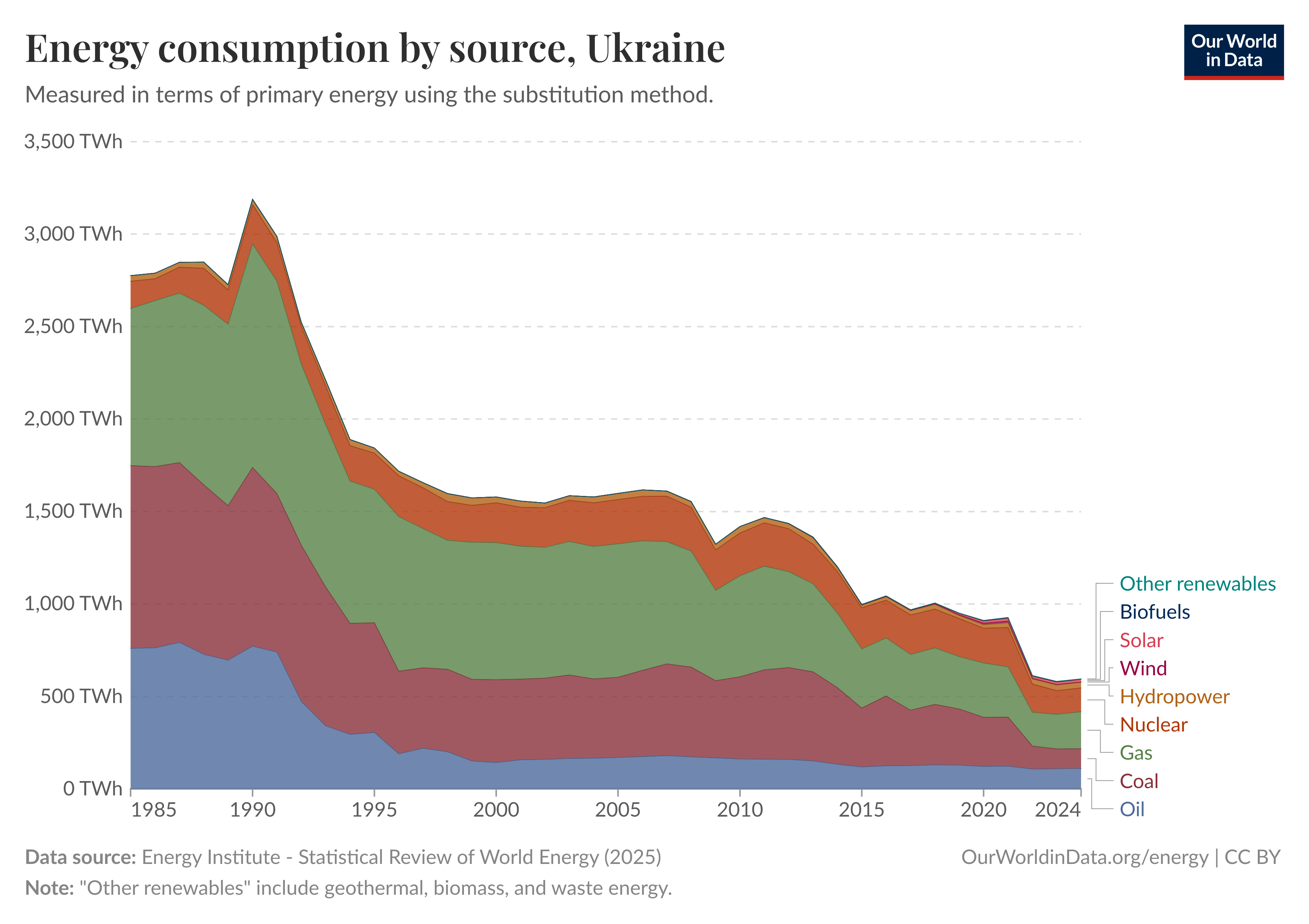
Energy consumption by source by year in Ukraine

The first eight months of 2024 saw more than 400 missiles and drones targeting Ukraine's energy infrastructure, with particularly intensive attacks in March and August. The August 26 assault was especially severe, involving 127 Russian missiles and 109 Shahed drones. While high-voltage substations were resilient with many being quickly repaired, the attacks significantly reduced the country's power generation capacity from the required 18 gigawatts (GW) to approximately 12-13 GW.

In addition, the Russian occupation of the Zaporizhzhia nuclear power plant alone removed six gigawatts of generating capacity from Ukraine's grid. Approximately 70% of the country's thermal generation amount was either damaged or under occupation by May 2024.

== Crisis ==
As a result of the constant Russian attacks and takeovers of critical Ukrainian facilities, roughly half of all high-voltage substations sustained damage, along with extensive portions of the distribution network. The heating network faced comparably severe impacts, with eighteen major combined heat and power plants and over 800 boiler houses rendered inoperable. The financial toll was enormous, with damage to the electric power sector alone exceeding US$11.4 billion by mid-2024. Experts estimated that restoration costs would approach $30 billion.

The International Energy Agency estimated that 2024 winter peak demand would reach 18.5 GW, marking a dramatic increase from summer 2024's 12 GW requirement. Even with many nuclear units returning to service combined with anticipated imports of 1.7 GW from the European Union, analysts predicted a potential supply shortfall of 6 GW— equivalent to Denmark's entire average peak demand. This deficit threatened to extend the duration of rolling blackouts that had already become part of daily life in the summer, potentially disrupting essential services including centralized water supply. Urban centers were considered to be most vulnerable to energy deficits due to holding about 70% of Ukraine's population, and due to the necessity of power for high-rise buildings to maintain heating, elevator function, and running water.

The August 26 Russian assault caused the energy crisis to reach an apex at the time, leaving about eight million Ukrainian households without power and triggering the first unscheduled blackout in Kyiv since November 2022.

In September 2024, CEO of Ukrainian state energy company Ukrenergo Volodymyr Kudrytskyi was dismissed by the Ministry of Energy, which in turn resulted in two Ukrenergo Supervisory Board members' resignations.

Matthias Schmale, the UN's resident and humanitarian coordinator in Ukraine, stated in mid-November 2024 that Russian forces had destroyed approximately 65% of Ukraine's energy production capacity, creating what he estimated would likely be the most difficult winter period of conflict so far.

Following extensive Russian airstrikes on 17 November, several districts in Odesa Oblast, including Bolhrad and Podilsk, suffered from power outages in their critical infrastructure. Later, emergency power cuts were planned to be instated across all of Ukraine on November 18 from 6 am to 10 pm, with restrictions on energy consumption issued in tandem.

In August 2026, in an interview with POLITICO, Ukrainian Energy Minister Denys Shmyhal stated "Russians have destroyed or damaged more than 80 percent of Ukraine's power generation." This was as a result of the attacks in the previous winter resulting in Ukraine's energy production dropping to 12 GW.

== Impact ==
The crisis fundamentally transformed energy consumption patterns across Ukraine. Industrial power usage plummeted by 50%, while residential consumption declined by 20%, primarily due to population displacement. Despite this reduction in household usage, it became the largest share of energy demand. Summer 2024 reached 2.3 GW below the 12 GW peak demand. Severe power shortages occurred throughout Summer 2024 as a result, with Kyiv experiencing several blackouts lasting up to 16 hours in July.

Analysts warned of a potential humanitarian crisis caused by the energy crisis and its impacts, potentially forcing population movements within Ukraine and across borders as certain areas became uninhabitable due to heating limitations.

=== Economic ===
Ukrenergo, Ukraine's national power grid operator, faced a potential technical default by November 2024 due to the energy crisis. Corporate governance issues complicated efforts to secure international investment and implement financial solutions towards upholding the electrical grid. Ukraine accumulated substantial debt amid the conflict, with the Ukrainian Cabinet of Ministers' restructuring of the national debt resulting in delayed government bond payments. This in turn negatively impacted several state-owned companies due to their inability to pay off their bonds. Ukrenergo was left unable to pay off its bonds in early November 2024 necessary to prevent technical default. This, in addition to the dismissal of its CEO and subsequent resignation of two Supervisory Board members, made investments towards the ailing energy sector less attractive to potential investors and international allies.

Electrical utilities further struggled with revenue losses from reduced economic activity caused by the war, while facing additional costs from infrastructure repairs and debris removal. As a result, Ukrainian energy companies accumulated substantial debt, and government subsidies for heating costs placed severe strain on its fiscal resources.

=== Education ===
The energy crisis posed significant challenges to the Ukrainian education sector, as schools required substantial infrastructure upgrades to maintain operations during power outages. The demand for increasingly low-in-supply battery systems and solar panels significantly increased, particularly due to the impossibility of conducting online education during blackouts.

=== Heating ===
District heating systems which supply several apartment blocks are vulnerable because of their centralisation. Analysts stated that while Summer 2024's warm weather and extended daylight hours partially masked the full extent of its infrastructure damage, the approaching winter— with average temperatures ranging from -4.8°C to 2°C while reaching as low as -20°C between December and March— threatened to starkly expose the system's vulnerabilities.

The International Energy Agency projected that heating capabilities would be worst impacted by regions near the conflict's front lines. Kharkiv Oblast lost several major heat-generating facilities, including the Kharkiv TEC-5 plant and the Zmiivska thermal power plant in March 2024 attacks. Similar challenges faced other war-impacted oblasts including Donetsk, Zaporizhzhia, Sumy, Chernihiv, and Mykolaiv. Even Kyiv, where 98% of residents relied on district heating, faced significant projected risks despite its three large and operational CHP plants.

It also estimated that the winter would increase household heating requirements by 25%, necessitating an additional 1.5 billion cubic meters of natural gas. The anticipated cessation of Russian gas transit through Ukraine in January 2025 further complicated the situation, eliminating possibilities for virtual gas reverse flows from the European Union and potentially increasing procurement costs. Ukraine receives natural gas from USA via LNG carriers offloading through Poland.

=== International impact ===
==== Baltic States ====
The planned decoupling of Baltic states' electricity systems from Russia and Belarus on February 7, 2025 in conjunction with Ukraine's energy constraints and limited shipment of energy supplies resulted in potential risks to their regional energy security. While Baltic transmission system operators had long prepared for independent operation, the temporary reliance on a lone synchronous interconnection with Poland until 2030 introduced additional vulnerabilities to the synchronous grid of Continental Europe.

==== Moldova ====
The expected cessation of Russian gas transit through Ukraine threatened to disrupt Moldova's energy supply arrangements, especially regarding the Transnistria region's gas supply and its electricity generation for the whole of the nation. This situation required approximately 600 to 650 megawatts of interconnection capacity with Romania, exceeding current allocations and potentially threatening its regional stability.

==== Southern Europe ====
Market dynamics also faced potential disruption due to the limiting of Russian gas and oil transit via Ukraine. Southeast Europe was considered to be particularly vulnerable, where electricity prices remained elevated compared to pre-war levels due to the region's dependence on natural gas and having "tight gas markets [that] have combined with congested energy corridors, warm weather and low hydropower generation, resulting in notable price disparities with the rest of Europe".

== Responses ==
Ukraine's energy sector underwent a radical transformation focusing on strategic energy resilience and redundancy in order to work around impacted sections of the energy grid. This included a shift toward decentralized power generation, with nearly 1,500 megawatts of consumer-installed solar power becoming operational by early 2024. Authorities implemented various protective measures, including the installation of emergency power systems for critical facilities, development of emergency response protocols, and the implementation of rolling blackouts to manage supply shortages.

Several Ukrainian cities implemented various contingency measures to maintain essential services during potential blackouts. Major metropolitan areas including Kyiv, Kharkiv, Odesa, and Zhytomyr developed emergency power systems for critical infrastructure, focusing on maintaining water supply, heating, and sanitation services. Healthcare facilities installed solar power systems and power generators into their electrical systems to allow for redundancy in case of power outages.

=== International ===
During the conflict, allies to Ukraine provided approximately US$2 billion in technical assistance to Ukraine's energy sector, with Ukrenergo receiving more than $1.5 billion of these funds. However, governance issues and market instability significantly exacerbated by the war hindered the effective utilization of this support towards rebuilding energy infrastructure and relieving energy constraints.

==== Europe ====
Ukraine began integration with the continental European grid. This connection provided access to up to 1.7 gigawatts of import capacity and emergency support capabilities following Ukraine's disconnection from the Russian and Belarusian power system. The integration proved especially important given the severe impact on Ukraine's domestic heating infrastructure, which had previously served over one-third of households through district heating networks, predominantly fueled by natural gas.

==== United Nations ====
United Nations officials condemned Russian targeting of civilian energy infrastructure as a direct violation of international humanitarian law which threatened to create a humanitarian crisis. The UN noted that residents of high-rise urban buildings, disabled individuals, elderly citizens, and the 3.6 million internally displaced people within Ukraine were especially vulnerable during extended power outages in sub-zero conditions. UN officials urged that European nations and the United States continue their current humanitarian assistance to prevent the worsening of healthcare failure, civilian casualties, and psychological trauma caused by Russian destruction of energy infrastructure and its impacts.

== Reconstruction investment ==
Thermal power plant destruction reduced dispatchable generation capacity from 36 GW to 12.8 GW, with the National Energy Company Ukrenergo documenting 847 instances of transmission and distribution infrastructure attacks. International financing through the European Bank for Reconstruction and Development's €3.1 billion programme and World Bank facilities totalling $2.8 billion targets emergency generation capacity and grid stabilisation, with completion timelines extending to 2027-2028 for full pre-conflict capacity restoration.

The regulatory framework established through NEURC Resolution 485 provides 15-year feed-in tariff guarantees supporting distributed generation deployment, with private sector investment concentrated in behind-the-meter solar and industrial captive power installations backed by political risk insurance.

== See also ==
- EU natural gas price cap
- Lukoil oil transit dispute
- 2022 Moldovan energy crisis
