= Svetlana Khustik =

Russian journalist (born 1978)

- Светлана Хустик
- Born: 1 September 1978 (age 47); Nizhnie Kuryat, Krasnoyarsk Krai, Russian SSR, USSR
- Citizenship: Russia
- Education: Krasnoyarsk State University
- Occupation: Journalist
- Known for: Reporting on the invasion of Ukraine
- Criminal charges: Disseminating knowingly false information
- Criminal status: Investigative detention

Svetlana Viktorovna Khustik (Russian: Светлана Викторовна Хустик; born 1 September 1978) is a Russian journalist based in Krasnoyarsk. Known for her reporting on social issues, in 2025 Khutstik was arrested on charges of disseminating "false news" in relation to the Russian invasion of Ukraine, which has been criticised by human rights groups.

== Biography ==
Khustik was born in Nizhnie Kuryat, Karatuzsky District, Krasnoyarsk Krai, in what was then the Russian Soviet Federative Socialist Republic of the Soviet Union. She studied philology and journalism at Krasnoyarsk State University. Khustik reported on the environment, culture and social issues for a variety of news outlets, including Takie Dela, Kedr, Komsomolskaya Pravda, Argumenty i Fakty, Snob, Current Time TV and NGS24. She sometimes wrote under the pseudonym Olga Sorokina. Khustik lives in Solontsy, Krasnoyarsk.

== Arrest and detention ==
At 06:00 on 29 September 2025, Khustik was arrested at her home in Solontsy by agents from the regional office of the Federal Security Service; her electronic items were also seized. Russian state media subsequently published a video of her being taken from her home and placed into a police van.

On 30 September, Khustik appeared before the Central District Court in Krasnoyarsk on charges of "disseminating knowingly false information about the actions of the Russian Armed Forces in contravention of part two of article 207.3 of the Criminal Code of Russia. The Investigative Committee for Krasnoyarsk Krai alleged that Khustik had been freelancing since April 2020 with multiple outlets registered by the Ministry of Justice as being "foreign agents". A May 2023 interview published in Sibr.Realii by Khustik (under her pseudonym Olga Sorokina) with artist Leonid Tishkov about his exhibition on the experiences of his father during attacks on the city of Uman during the Great Patriotic War, which mentioned a Russian missile strike that had killed 23 people in the Ukrainian city of Uman on 28 April 2023, was cited as key evidence, with it being alleged that Khustik had been paid 64, 000 RUB to publish "false news" about the strike. Khustik acknowledged having worked for Sibr.Realii, but stated she had stopped working with them after it was labelled "undesirable" by the Russian government in February 2024. Khustik's lawyer requested she be placed under home arrest but this was denied due to her having a foreign passport; she was ordered to be placed under investigative detention for two months.

== Response ==
The Committee to Protect Journalists called on Russian authorities to end its persecution of Khustik, stating that she had been imprisoned for doing her job. The Safety of Journalists Platform called for the charges against Khustik to be dropped and for the Council of Europe to give sustained attention to the situation for journalists working in Russia. Novaya Gazeta criticised the charges against Khustik, stating that there was no ban on adults interacting with entities labelled as foreign agents, and further stating that the mention of the missile strike on Uman in her article had been added retrospectively by an editor.
