= TEC-5 =

TEC-5, or Tec 5, may refer to:

- Kharkiv TEC-5, a thermo-electric powerplant in the Kharkiv region of Ukraine
- Technician fifth grade or Tec 5, a rank of the United States Army in the 1940s
