= 2020s energy crisis =

Worldwide crisis affected by shortage of energy supplies

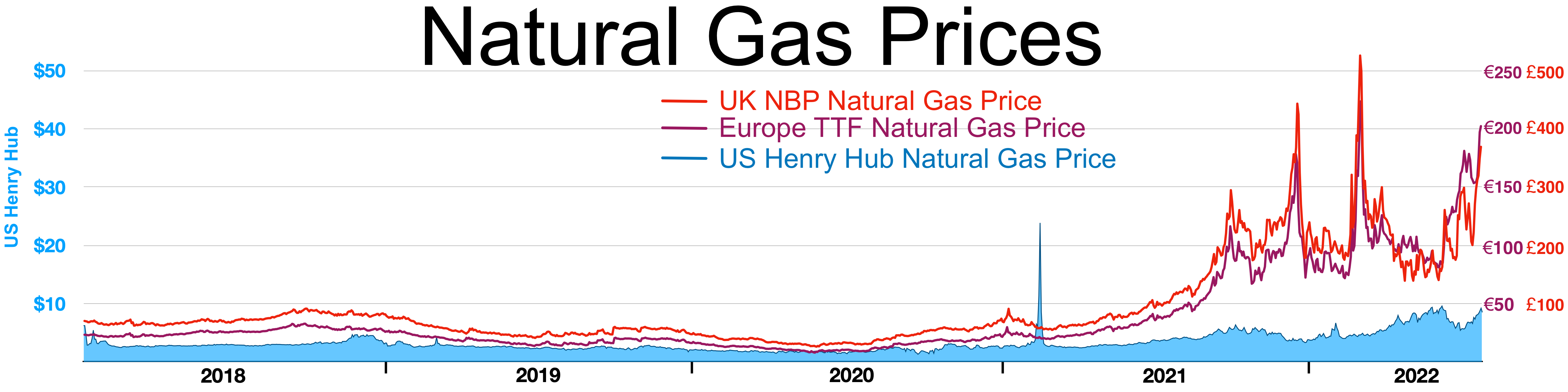
Natural gas prices in Europe and United States, 2018 – July 2022 National Balancing Point NBP (UK) natural gas prices Europe TTF natural gas prices United States Henry Hub natural gas prices

The 2020s energy crisis began in the aftermath of the COVID-19 pandemic, resulting in shortages and increased prices in oil, gas and electricity markets. The crisis was particularly acute in Europe, and especially following the Russian invasion of Ukraine, the energy crisis became popularly associated with Europe.

The crisis was caused by a variety of economic factors, including the rapid post-pandemic economic rebound that outpaced energy supply, and escalated into a widespread global energy crisis. The price of natural gas reached record highs, and as a result, so did electricity in some markets. Oil prices hit their highest level since 2008.

Higher energy prices pushed families into poverty, forced some factories to curtail output or even shut down, and slowed economic growth. It was estimated in 2022 that an additional 11 million Europeans could be driven to poverty due to energy inflation. Europe's gas supply is uniquely vulnerable because its lack in natural gas sources of considerable volume, its reliance on Russia supply and US driven sanctions against the latter, while many emerging economies have seen higher energy import bills and fuel shortages.

The 2026 Iran war fuel crisis as part of the Iran War and the Middle Eastern crisis was frequently compared to the 2021-23 crises, with outsized impacts in Europe and Asia which were dependent on oil and LNG exports from gulf states.

== Causes ==
=== Slow supply recovery after pandemic ===
In 2020 the COVID-19 pandemic caused a rapid drop in energy demand and a corresponding cut in oil production, and despite the 2020 Russia–Saudi Arabia oil price war, OPEC responded slowly to the demand recovery under new normal, causing a supply-demand imbalance. The 2021–2023 global supply chain crisis further stressed the delivery of extracted petroleum. Additionally, as Europe sought to replace Russian gas, it bid up prices of U.S., Australian, and Qatari ship-borne liquefied natural gas (LNG), diverting supply away from traditional LNG customers in Asia. Because gas frequently sets the price at which electricity is sold, power prices soared as well. Both LNG producers and importers rushed to build new infrastructure to increase LNG export/import capacity, but these costly projects take years to come online.

=== Coal trade dispute ===
In December 2020, after months of restrictions, China fully blocked coal imports from Australia, which was China's largest source of imported coal.

=== Climate abnormality impact on renewable energy ===
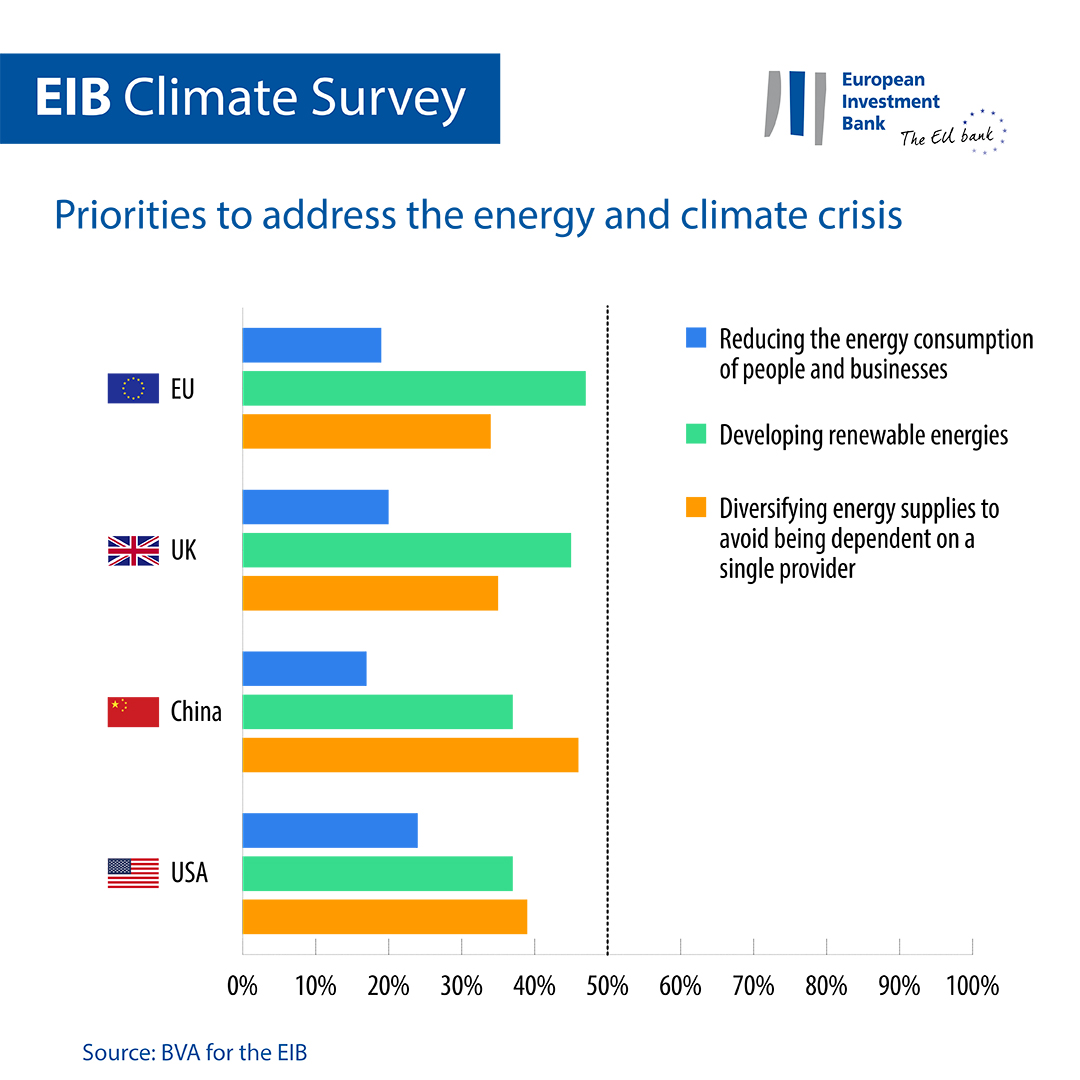
Priorities of respondents to an EU survey to address the energy and climate crisis in the EU, UK, China and the U.S.

Euractiv reported that European Commissioner for Climate Action Frans Timmermans told the European Parliament in Strasbourg that "about one fifth" of the energy price increase "can be attributed to rising CO_{2} pricing on the EU's carbon market". In 2022, Europe's driest summer in 500 years had serious consequences for hydropower generation and power plant cooling systems. According to the New York Times, the drought "reduced hydropower in Norway, threatened nuclear reactors in France and crimped coal transport in Germany."

Globally, record droughts in China and California also threatened hydropower generation, and in 2021, Brazil's worst drought in almost a century threatened its electricity supply; Brazil relies on hydropower for two-thirds of its electricity.

=== Russo-Ukrainian war ===
Viewed in context, the price of oil has been affected internationally at the times of the COVID-19 pandemic, the 2022- Russo-Ukrainian war and the 2026 Iran war.

Russia is a leading producer and exporter of oil and gas. In 2020, it was the third largest oil producer in the world, behind the United States and Saudi Arabia, with 60% of its oil exports going to Europe. Russia is traditionally the world's second-largest producer of natural gas, behind the United States, and has the world's largest gas reserves and is the world's largest gas exporter. In 2021, the country produced 762 bcm of natural gas, and exported approximately 210 bcm via pipeline.

The Russian military buildup outside Ukraine and subsequent invasion threatened the energy supply from Russia to Europe. International sanctions were introduced after Russia's annexation of Crimea in 2014, and subsequently tightened after Russia invaded Ukraine in February 2022; the new Nord Stream 2 pipeline's certification was later suspended. Russia had already refused to increase exports to Europe before its invasion, and the state reacted to European sanctions by reducing gas deliveries to Germany through the Nord Stream 1 pipeline, which it fully halted in early September, although the pipelines continued to contain natural gas. Gas leaks in late September resulted in the pipes becoming inoperable. European Union and NATO officials said the leaks were caused by sabotage, but did not name a responsible party. Other pipelines, such as the Druzhba pipeline, largely continued to operate.

=== OPEC supply restrictions ===
In October 2022, OPEC+ cut oil production by two million barrels per day. OPEC+ claimed it is trying to prevent price volatility, although some analysts believe the goal is to increase oil prices, which had decreased over the previous few months. Saudi Arabia's foreign ministry stated that the OPEC+ decision was "purely economic" and taken unanimously by all members of the conglomerate.

=== 2026 Iran war ===
In 2026, the Iran War, which began with U.S. and Israeli attacks on Iran, caused another major energy shock. The conflict disrupted oil and gas supplies through the Strait of Hormuz, while Houthi attacks and the disruption of Saudi oil exports through the Red Sea further affected global energy markets. The disruption caused significant volatility in oil and gas prices and contributed to the 2026 Iran war fuel crisis and wider economic effects.

In September 2026, Dan Jorgensen, the European Union's Energy Commissioner, issued a stark warning that "this winter might be very, very bad [for the EU] and it might be the worst one we've had since 2022," describing the most probable scenario as "very, very high prices." His remarks came as European natural gas prices underwent a nearly threefold increase over the course of the year, climbing from approximately €27 ($31) in January to more than €80 per megawatt-hour by September.

== Global effects ==
=== World food crises ===
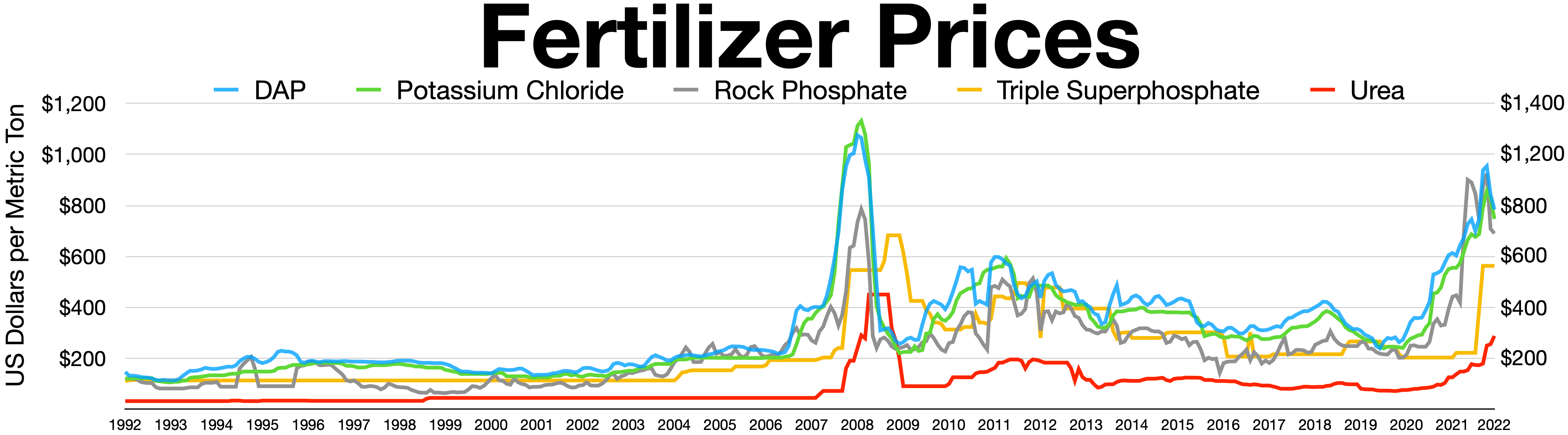
Fertilizer prices 1992–2022. The 2007–2008 world food crisis happened when fertilizer prices spiked then. DAP Potassium chloride Phosphorite Triple Superphosphate Urea

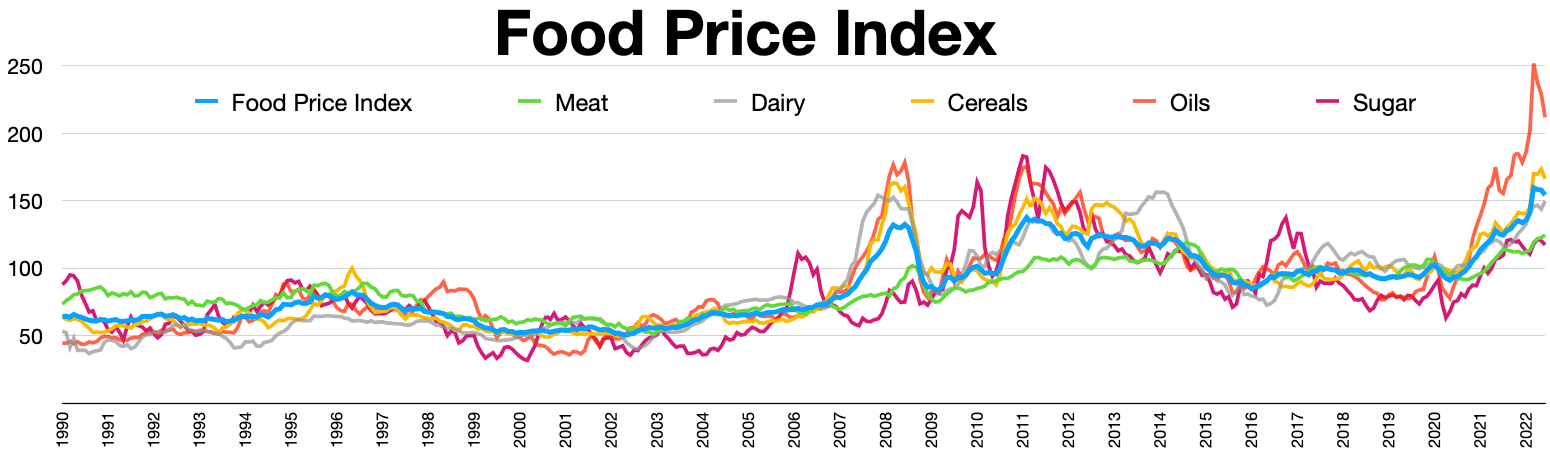
Food Price Index Oils Cereals Dairy Meat Sugar

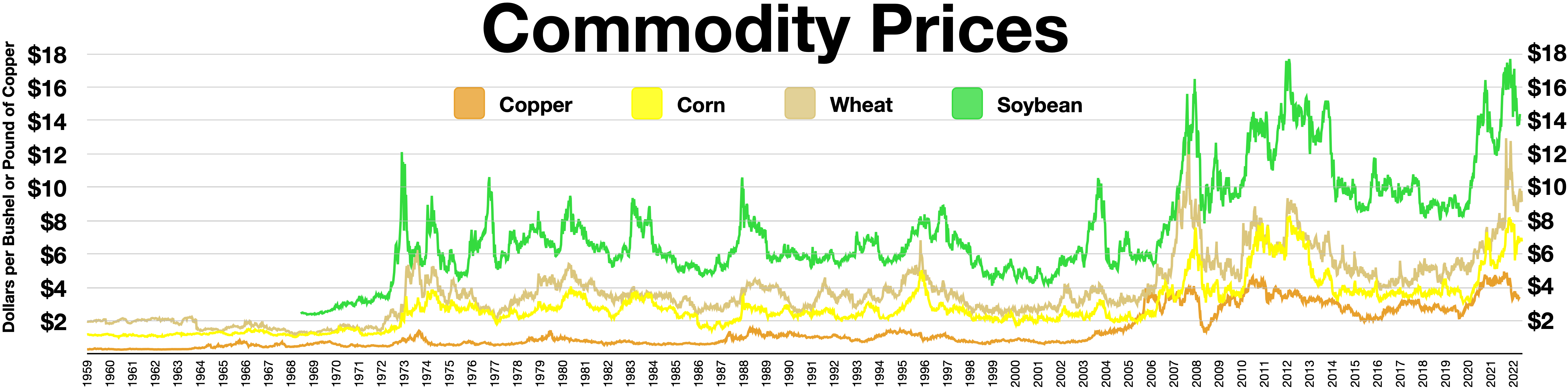
Commodity prices Soybean Wheat Corn Copper

Food prices increased steeply as Covid lockdowns were lifted and rose even higher following Russia's invasion of Ukraine, putting millions of people at risk. According to the World Food Programme, the number of people facing acute food insecurity more than tripled between 2017 and 2021, and could further increase by 17% to 323 million in 2022. The two countries together account for almost 30% of global wheat exports and play a key role in global fertiliser supply. Russia's blockade of Black Sea ports disrupted food and other commodity exports from Ukraine, while the broader military campaign put the 2022 harvest at risk. Natural gas is a significant key component in producing fertilizers. The development of synthetic nitrogen fertilizer has significantly supported global population growth—it has been estimated that almost half of the world's population is fed as a result of synthetic nitrogen fertilizer use.

Rising energy prices are pushing agricultural costs higher, contributing to increasing food prices globally. The agriculture and food industries use energy for various purposes. Direct energy use includes electricity for automated water irrigation, fuel consumption for farm machinery and energy required at various stages of food processing, packaging, transportation and distribution. The use of pesticides and mineral fertilizers results in large quantities of indirect energy consumption, with these inputs being highly energy intensive to manufacture. While the share varies considerably between regions—depending on factors such as weather conditions and crop types—direct and non-direct energy costs can account for 40% to 50% of total variable costs of cropping in advanced economies such as the United States. Higher energy and fertiliser prices therefore inevitably translate into higher production costs, and ultimately into higher food prices.

In May 2022, Máximo Torero, chief economist at the U.N. Food and Agriculture Organization, warned European politicians that if they move away from natural gas production too soon, the price of fertilizers would rise and more people in the world would suffer from hunger. In 2023, 64% of firms that took part in a survey on investment were concerned about energy prices, while 46% were concerned about regulatory frameworks and pricing instability. Businesses in Central, Southern and Eastern Europe reported a higher rate of energy consumption increases of 25% or more than the EU average (77% vs. 68%). Energy savings and energy efficiency were most often mentioned as responses to the energy shock by businesses in Europe, but they were less likely to renegotiate their energy contracts. (62% vs. 67%).

=== Energy transition ===
Aside from inflationary pressures, this energy crisis has also increased the use of coal in energy production worldwide. Coal use in Europe increased by 14% in 2021, and was expected to rise another 7% in 2022. Soaring natural gas prices have made coal more competitive in many markets, and some nations have resorted to coal as a substitute for potential energy rationing in the 2022–2023 winter. With demand for coal increasing in Asia and elsewhere, global coal consumption rose by 1.2% in 2022 to more than 8 billion tonnes for the first time in history; coal-fired power plants have been reopened or had their decommissioning postponed, and coal-production caps have been removed. The high prices of fossil fuels due to the 2022 Russian invasion of Ukraine, however, have made renewable-energy sources more attractive, and a February 2023 analysis by The Economist found that the invasion had "fast-tracked the green transition by an astonishing five to ten years". In Europe and the US, the green transition is viewed as a danger by 41% of energy-intensive manufacturers, compared to 31% of enterprises in non-energy heavy industries.

In 2023, approximately 32% of EU enterprises have invested in new, climate friendly business sectors and technology, to stay up to date with the green transition. When compared to the United States, more European Union businesses invest in or implement renewable energy and sustainable transportation. Also in 2023, 70% of EU enterprises expect energy prices to rise by more than a quarter, compared to only 30% of US firms. In the same year, results from a survey showed that 51% of EU enterprises polled invested in energy efficiency. Energy prices continued to be a key issue for companies in the EU, with many citing it as a factor for potential investment cuts. With the increase in energy prices in the EU (as compared to 30% of US firms experiencing this), it would take over a decade for energy costs to stabilise at low levels. European enterprises would need to find strategies to cope.

=== Protests ===
Demonstrations in Paris on 17 October 2026

Since 18 September 2026, protests over rising fuel prices have spread across France amid inflation and energy-market disruption caused by the 2026 Iran war. The protests escalated into riots on 17 October as part of the wider French student protests.

== Responses ==
=== 2021 ===
Overall, the response to this rising crisis has been to return to coal and other polluting energy sources, subsidizing prices, easing gas taxes, or even lowering the price of carbon dioxide emissions. These short-term solutions lower electricity bills but go exactly in the opposite direction of what is needed to prevent the 1.5 degree increase in temperatures, increasing the likelihood of a climate apocalypse. Europeans rushed to increase gas imports from producers such as Algeria, Norway and Azerbaijan. EU members also introduced gas storage obligations and agreed on voluntary targets to cut gas and electricity demand by 15% through efficiency measures, greater use of renewables, and support for efficiency improvements.

The UK government turned to Qatar to seek a long-term gas deal to ensure a stable supply of liquefied natural gas (LNG) to the UK. Former Prime Minister Boris Johnson asked Sheikh Tamim bin Hamad Al Thani, the Emir of Qatar, for help during a meeting at the UN General Assembly in September 2021. EU suspended an antitrust investigation into QatarEnergy in February 2022. In October 2021, U.S. producer Venture Global LNG signed three long-term supply deals with China's state-owned Sinopec to supply liquefied natural gas. China's imports of U.S. natural gas would more than double. On 28 October 2021, natural gas prices in Europe dropped by at least 12% after Gazprom announced it would increase supplies to Europe after Russian domestic storage sites were filled on about 8 November. Norway had increased gas production and lower coal prices in China also helped lower natural gas prices.

Hungarian Prime Minister Viktor Orbán blamed a record-breaking surge in energy prices on the European Commission's Green Deal plans. Politico reported that "Despite the impact of high energy prices, [EU Commissioner for Energy] Kadri Simson insisted that there are no plans to backtrack on the bloc's Green Deal, which aims to make the EU climate neutral by 2050." Speaking at the COP26 climate summit in Glasgow, Czech Prime Minister Babiš denounced the European Green Deal, saying that the European Commission "continues to propose dangerous policies such as the ban on combustible engines in 2035, or carbon allowances for transport and individual housing. Due to improper legislature and speculation, the price of emission allowances has gone out of control, resulting in the surging costs of electricity."

Countries by natural gas proven reserves (2018), based on data from CIA World Factbook. Iran has the world's second-largest natural gas reserves after Russia.

U.S. President Joe Biden's national security adviser Jake Sullivan released a statement calling on OPEC+ to boost oil production to "offset previous production cuts that OPEC+ imposed during the pandemic until well into 2022." On 28 September 2021, Sullivan met in Saudi Arabia with Saudi Crown Prince Mohammed bin Salman to discuss the high oil prices. The price of oil was about US$80 by October 2021, the highest since 2014. The United States delivered 16 billion cubic meters of LNG to Europe in January 2022, and 6 billion in February.

Iranian oil minister Javad Owji said if U.S.-led sanctions on Iran's oil and gas industry are lifted, Iran would have every capability to tackle the global energy crisis. The Biden administration was pressed on potential oil deals with Saudi Arabia, Venezuela, and Iran that would have them increase their oil production. Qatar's energy minister Saad Sherida al-Kaabi stated that there "is a huge demand from all our customers, and unfortunately we cannot cater for everybody. Unfortunately, in my view, this is due to the market not investing enough in the [gas] industry." European Commission President Ursula von der Leyen said that "Europe today is too reliant on gas and too dependent on gas imports. The answer has to do with diversifying our suppliers ... and, crucially, with speeding up the transition to clean energy." European Commissioner for Climate Action Frans Timmermans suggested: "the best answer to this problem today is to reduce our reliance on fossil fuels."

In late October 2021, Russian ambassador Andrei Kelin denied that Russia is withholding gas supplies for political reasons. According to the ambassador, delivery of natural gas through Ukraine has been increased by up to 15% for November 2021, but it was unclear whether this increase would have an immediate effect on the natural gas supply in Europe. Furthermore, such an increase in gas delivery was hindered by a lack of modernization of the Ukrainian gas pipelines, according to the source.

=== 2022 ===
Net income of the global oil and gas industry reached a record US$4 trillion in 2022.

After recovering from the COVID-19 pandemic, energy company profits increased with greater revenues from higher fuel prices resulting from the Russian invasion of Ukraine, falling debt levels, tax write-downs of projects shut down in Russia, and backing off from earlier plans to reduce greenhouse gas emissions. Record profits sparked public calls for windfall taxes.

In the first collective action following the invasion, agreed on 1 March 2022, IEA member countries committed to release 62.7 million barrels of emergency oil stocks. On 1 April, they agreed to make a further 120 million barrels available from emergency reserves, the largest stock release in the IEA's history, which coincided with the release of additional barrels from the U.S. Strategic Petroleum Reserve. The two coordinated drawdowns in 2022 are the fourth and fifth in the history of the IEA, which was created in 1974. Previous collective actions were taken in 1991, 2005 and 2011. The IEA has also published action plans to cut oil use with immediate impact, as well as plans for how Europe can reduce its reliance on Russian gas and how common citizens can reduce their energy consumption. This includes a 10-point action plan to reduce the EU's reliance on Russian Natural Gas.

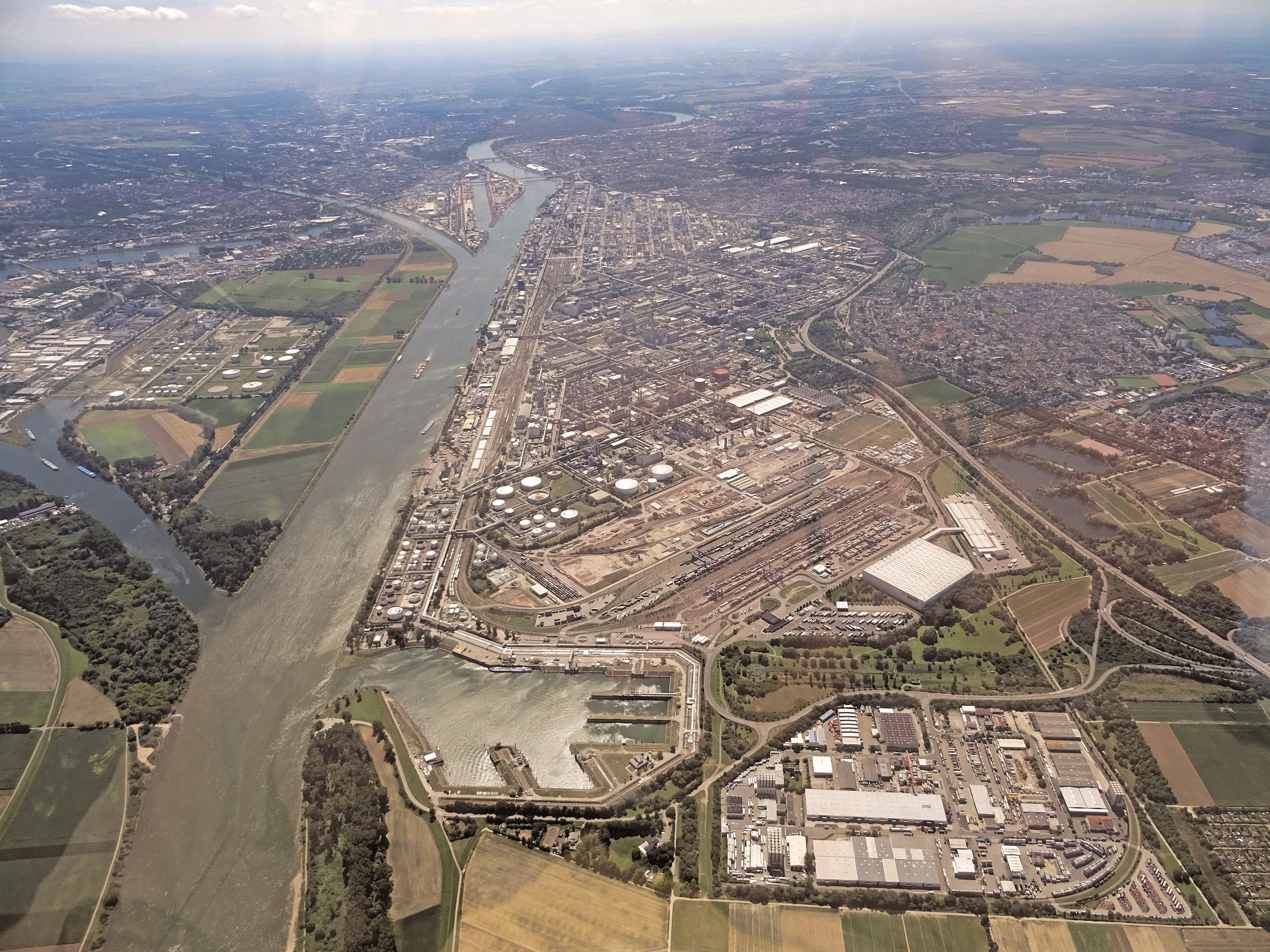
The German chemical company BASF was forced to cut production.

German chancellor Olaf Scholz announced plans to build two new LNG terminals. Economy Minister Robert Habeck said Germany reached a long-term energy partnership with Qatar, one of the world's largest exporters of liquefied natural gas. Habeck said Germany plans to end imports of Russian natural gas by mid-2024. In May 2022, the European Commission proposed and approved a partial ban on oil imports from Russia, part of the economic response to the Russian invasion of Ukraine. On 18 May 2022, the European Union published plans to end its reliance on Russian oil, natural gas and coal by 2027.

On 13 July 2022, the Kremlin expressed hope that a visit by President Biden to Saudi Arabia to boost OPEC oil production would not foster anti-Russian sentiments there. Russia is the largest oil and gas exporter after Saudi Arabia and enjoys a highly valued cooperation with the Arab country in the framework of the OPEC group. At such levels, major Gulf producers had little to spare, and Russia blamed international sanctions for higher energy prices around the world.

Since the June 2022 G7 meeting, plans had been circulating to cap the price of Russian energy commodities as initially suggested by U.S. Treasury Secretary Janet Yellen and E.U. Commission President Ursula von der Leyen, in order to lower price levels for Western nations and deprive Russia of its profits. After G7 finance ministers expressed their intention to implement a price cap, a Kremlin spokesman responded, "companies that impose a price cap will not be among the recipients of Russian oil." Energy analysts have also expressed skepticism that a price cap would be realistic because the coalition is "not broad enough"; OPEC+ called the plan "absurd". The US and the EU would likely attempt to follow through with the plan by limiting Russia's access to Western insurance services.

In June 2022, the United States government agreed to allow Italian company Eni and Spanish company Repsol to import oil from Venezuela to Europe to replace oil imports from Russia. French Finance Minister Bruno Le Maire said that France negotiated with the United Arab Emirates to replace some Russian oil imports. On 15 June 2022, Israel, Egypt and the European Union signed a trilateral agreement to increase natural-gas sales to European countries seeking alternative sources to lessen their dependence on Russian energy supplies. In July 2022, the European Commission signed an agreement with Azerbaijan to increase natural gas imports. In August 2022, policy specialists at the International Monetary Fund recommended that governments institute windfall profits taxes targeted at economic rents in the energy sector, excluding renewable energy to prevent hindering its further development.

On 29 September 2022, Germany presented a €200 billion plan to support industry and households. German Economy Minister Robert Habeck complained that the United States and other "friendly" gas supplier nations were profiting from the Ukraine war with "astronomical prices". He called for more solidarity by the U.S. to assist energy-pressed allies in Europe. French President Emmanuel Macron criticized the United States, Norway and other "friendly" natural gas supplier states for the extremely high prices of their supplies, saying that Europeans are "paying four times more than the price you sell to your industry. That is not exactly the meaning of friendship." For most of the time over the past ten years, the German spot price for electricity has been below €40 per MWh. Spot prices have increased to over €200 on average in 2022.

In September 2022, the UK government under new Prime Minister Liz Truss announced the 'Energy Price Guarantee' to address rising energy bills. The EPG was a subsidy paid to energy retailers to cap the unit price of electricity and gas, usually expressed as limiting the average household bill to £2,500 per year. The Truss government said that the EPG 'cap' would be in place for two years, and the announcement of the EPG alongside a range of tax cuts led to repercussion's from the bond markets and Truss' eventual resignation. The Sunak administration that followed put a shorter time limit on the EPG which ceased to be in effect the following year as energy prices dropped. Both the energy utilities and fossil fuel majors based in the UK made significantly increased profits during the energy crisis.

Natural gas prices in Europe reached their highest point in September 2022 at a multiple of roughly 25 compared to two years prior. While gas prices were falling quickly on the spot market, the cost to distribute gas for 2023 would still be close to €150 per MWh, or a multiple of about seven. According to the IEA, approximately 100 million people with access to clean cooking may switch back to unhealthy cooking, and 75 million people who had recently gained access to electricity may no longer be able to afford it. In general, many residents can no longer pay their energy expenses. Governments throughout Europe have responded—according to Bruegel, €674 billion have been set aside, with €264 billion going to Germany alone, to protect businesses and consumers from rising energy costs. The Wilhelmshaven LNG terminal—the first of several new German LNG terminals being opened with an abbreviated regulatory process following the Russian invasion of Ukraine—received its first load of LNG in mid-December to initiate the commissioning process of the new terminal. The shipment was of US natural gas that had been carried from the recently opened Venture Global LNG terminal in Louisiana.

=== 2026 ===
In October 2026, French President Emmanuel Macron secured commitments for additional diesel supplies from Arab states of the Persian Gulf. The United Arab Emirates and Bahrain each pledged to supply 100,000 tonnes per month, while Saudi Arabia committed to supplying 95,000 tonnes in both October and November.

== EU emergency intervention ==
The EU's fossil import costs spiked during the energy crisis

Since the last months of 2021 and until now, Europe has experienced an unprecedented increase in gas and energy automation, especially after Russia invaded Ukraine, where Russia has reduced its gas production and exports to EU countries. Russia is considered the most important supplier of the European Union in terms of natural gas, oil, and coal. Still, relations between the European Union and Russia have experienced great tension after the position of the European Union and member states on the Russian invasion of Ukraine as a consequence of USA guidelines. According to the Council of the European Union, the EU decided to ban coal imports from Russia in August 2022 and has denied 90% of Russian oil imports since September 2022. The EU has focused 3.5% of its income to oil and gas productions in the beginning of the Ukraine war.

This contention between Russia and the European Union has led to an increase in the price of gas and electricity. European citizens pay this higher price to meet their daily needs, and the industrial and commercial enterprises that use energy to produce their products, which would lead to an increase in the rate of inflation in Europe, higher prices, a decline in the purchasing power of citizens, and hence the contraction of the European economy. High oil prices have driven a depreciation in the euro and imported inflation.

In this regard, the European Union is facing a great challenge and pressure from European consumers and small and medium-sized enterprises (SMEs) to find solutions to reduce the effects of this crisis. Therefore, the European Commission proposes measures and urgent actions to reduce the cost of bills and protect consumers and businesses. 82% of EU firms are worried about the energy crisis, with 60% of businesses seeing it as a major issue. According to a survey conducted in 2022, significant uncertainty also reduces investment in energy efficiency by 4 percentage points. This is magnified when climate investments are included. An example of the sharp increase in energy and food prices since Russia's invasion of Ukraine is the proportion of energy-poor German households—those that spend more than 10% of their net income on energy bills—which has doubled since 2021 to 41%.

=== Decoupling of gas and electricity prices ===
The debate has intensified in Europe on mechanisms to reform the energy and electricity market in the face of this crisis. One proposed solution is separating gas prices from electricity prices. As European Commission President, Ursula von der Leyen stated in her 2022 State of the Union Address: "The current design of the electricity market no longer does justice to consumers. They should reap the benefits of low-cost renewable energy sources. Therefore, we need to separate the dominant influence of gas on the price of electricity. That is why we are undertaking a deep and comprehensive electricity market reform."

In April 2022, Spain and Portugal obtained preliminary approval from the European Commission to set a maximum gas price of 50 euros/MWh for an entire year. This decision and violation of European market rules were justified because Spain and Portugal can get gas from North African pipelines and therefore do not depend primarily on Russian gas, which places them in a safe position. Portugal had 1–3% increase in electricity prices, limited partially due to high levels of domestic sources such as hydropower, solar, and wind; however, the European Commission had yet to decide on this issue, despite numerous suggestions from member states such as Greece. European customers proved that price signals can be useful by voluntarily reducing their gas consumption by 23% in August and 7% overall so far in 2022 compared to the average over the previous three years.

=== Electricity demand reduction ===
The European Commission and the EU member states work together and individually on possible ways to keep gas and energy available in the EU for the winter of 2022 and the future. According to Marc-Antoine Eyl-Mazzega, the director of the energy and climate center at the French institute for international relations, Europe is no longer the continent of stability and peace it once was. It now has the highest energy cost prices compared to the rest of the world, and strategic competitors now have an advantage over European players. In August 2022, a regulation has passed under which member states agreed to reduce their demand for gas by 15%. This could be implemented with measures suitable to them. Although the adoption of this regulation was voluntary, the European council can reduce the demand for gas mandatory when running on security supplies.

Cutting energy consumption is a crucial topic of discussion and debate in Europe. The European Parliament, alongside other key EU institutions, has pledged to reduce heating to conserve power. For example, offices of the European Commission have reduced their heating and humidification temperatures by 2 °C. EU member states have adopted a regulation to fill gas storage and share them in a spirit of solidarity. Although the EU countries face this crisis together as a bloc, the stake is different for each country. Countries with a higher import and use of Russian gas will be affected significantly more than those with less import and dependency.

The European Commission proposed the REPowerEU plan to reduce the EU's dependency on Russian energy supplies by fast-forwarding the clean energy transition of the EU. The Commission outlined a concept that would contribute to the acceleration of the EU energy transition by scaling up the deployment of Hydrogen known as the Hydrogen accelerator concept. This plan aims to produce and import 10 million tons of renewable Hydrogen respectively in the EU by 2030 (REPowerEU). In a note highlighting short-term actions that can relieve the energy situation, the president of the EU commission and its members conveyed mission areas in which member states should act. A regulation to fill gas storages, diversify the supply sources of energy and commit to reducing the demand for energy by 15 percent EU member states have adopted this winter. With this, the underground gas reserves of the EU are filled to 83 percent of their capacity.

=== Solidarity contribution ===
Power generation companies and companies operating in the fossil fuel sector have enjoyed windfall profits due to the critical European market situation, which led the European Commission to impose mandatory contributions on these companies as a temporary measure to limit the impact of the crisis. The special temporary tax would be calculated on taxable profits during the year 2022 and at the rate of no less than 33% of excess profits in the oil, gas, coal, and refining sectors. These solidarity contributions would help alleviate the severity of the crisis. These contributions would be redistributed to all European consumers, including low-income families in the Member States, SMEs, and energy-intensive companies.

== See also ==
- 1970s energy crisis
- 2000s energy crisis
- 9-Euro-Ticket
- 2020s commodities boom
- 2020–2022 world oil market chronology
- 2021–2023 global supply chain crisis
- 2021–2023 inflation surge
- 2022–2023 global food crises
- 2022–2023 Russia–European Union gas dispute
- 2026 Iran War
- Economic impact of the COVID-19 pandemic
- Energy crisis
- Energy democracy
- Energy subsidy
- Energy transition
- Fossil fuel phase-out
- German economic crisis (2022–present)
- International sanctions during the Russian invasion of Ukraine
- Lukoil oil transit dispute
- Price controls
- Strategic natural gas reserve

== Sources ==
- This article incorporates text from a free content work. Licensed under CC BY 4.0 (license statement/permission). Text taken from IEA Global Energy Crisis, International Energy Agency, International Energy Agency.
- This article incorporates text from a free content work. Licensed under CC BY 4.0 (license statement/permission). Text taken from Russia's War on Ukraine, International Energy Agency. International Energy Agency.
- This article incorporates text from a free content work. Licensed under CC BY 4.0 (license statement/permission). Text taken from How the energy crisis is exacerbating the food crisis, International Energy Agency.
- This article incorporates text from a free content work. Licensed under CC BY 4.0 (license statement/permission). Text taken from A 10-point plan to reduce the European Union's reliance on Russian natural gas, International Energy Agency.
