= Lesosibirsk State Pedagogical Institute =

- Лесосибирский государственный педагогический институт
- Established: 1940
- Location: Lesosibirsk, Krasnoyarsk Krai, Russia
- Language: Russian
- Website: https://lpi.sfu-kras.ru

Lesosibirsk State Pedagogical Institute (Russian: Лесосибирский государственный педагогический институт) is a higher education institution founded on 22 June 1940 to train highly qualified teaching staff. It was reorganized on 4 May 1990 by joining Krasnoyarsk State University as a branch (since 2006 - Siberian Federal University).

== History ==
On 22 June 1940, by the Decree of the Council of People's Commissars of the RSFSR No. 463 and the order of the People's Commissariat for Education of the RSFSR No. 1011, the Yenisei Teachers' Institute was established on the basis of the Yenisei Pedagogical School with a two-year training period. Two educational departments were created in the structure of the institute: history and Russian language and literature. One hundred and eight people were accepted as students for the first year of the institute. During the Great Patriotic War, the number of students did not exceed eighty people, in addition to training, students worked in collective farms on the labor front. In wartime, five classrooms were created in the structure of the institute: military affairs, Russian language and literature, history, independent work and the foundations of Marxism–Leninism, and the number of teachers did not exceed eleven people. Since 1947, after the end of the war, three general institute departments were created in the structure of the institute: Russian language and literature, history and physics and mathematics. Since 1950, the Ministry of Education of the USSR at the institute has been fully staffed with teaching staff in the number of thirteen people, in 1952 - sixteen people and in 1954 - seventeen people.

On 18 June 1954, by the Decree of the Council of Ministers of the USSR No. 6579-r and the order of the Ministry of Education of the RSFSR No. 481, the Yenisei Teachers' Institute was reorganized into the Yenisei State Pedagogical Institute. Six general institute departments were created in the structure of the institute, with a total number of teaching staff: 1955 - thirty teachers, 1960 - forty-eight, 1976 - fifty, of which eighteen people had academic degrees and academic titles. In 1961, by the decision of the Astronomical Council of the USSR Academy of Sciences, the Institute opened the Station for Observing Artificial Earth Satellites, in three areas of work: photometric observations, development and research of new high-precision methods for observing satellites, and development of methods for predicting satellite flybys. From 1942 to 1966, the number of graduates of the institute was six hundred and seventy-three people, and from 1970 to 1973 - five hundred and thirteen.

On June 3, 1977, by the Decree of the Council of Ministers of the RSFSR No. 323 and the order of the Ministry of Education of the RSFSR No. 138, the Yenisei State Pedagogical Institute was transferred to the city of Lesosibirsk and the Lesosibirsk State Pedagogical Institute was established on its basis. The structure of the institute included five faculties, as well as full-time and correspondence departments. In 1983, by the decision of the Collegium of the Ministry of Education of the RSFSR and the Presidium of the Republican Committee of Trade Unions of Educational Workers and Higher Education, the challenge Red Banner was awarded to the Institute "for success in the training of teaching staff". May 4, 1990 Decree of the Council of Ministers of the USSR No. 448 Lesosibirsk State Pedagogical Institute becomes a branch of the Krasnoyarsk State University.

On December 28, 2006, by order of the Federal Agency for Education No. 1662, the Lesosibirsk Pedagogical Institute became a branch of the Siberian Federal University. Five faculties were created in the structure of the institute: philological, pedagogy and methods of primary education, pedagogy and psychology, physics and mathematics and additional education. In the future, the structure of the institute remained the faculty of additional education, five general institute departments: philology and language communication, higher mathematics, computer science and natural science, pedagogy, psychology of personality development and basic disciplines and seven research laboratories: education quality management, theoretical and applied linguistics, general and experimental physics, technical teaching aids and information resources, electronic communications and software support, psychological and pedagogical workshop and pedagogical business games. The Institute takes 2nd place in the ranking of higher educational institutions of Lesosibirsk and 897th place among all higher educational institutions of the Russian Federation. During its existence, the institute has produced more than 20 thousand specialist teachers for educational institutions.

== Management ==
- Bekhterev, Vadim Filippovich (1987–1994)
- Adolf, Vladimir Alexandrovich (1994–1999)
- Loginov, Yuri Yurievich (1999–2011)
- Khramova, Lyudmila Nikolaevna (since 2011)

== Notable faculty and alumni ==
- Lurie, Yakov Solomonovich - Doctor of Philology, Professor
- Yuri Rumer - Doctor of Physical and Mathematical Sciences, Professor

== Literature ==
- Труд и вдохновение. 60 лет Лесосибирскому (Енисейскому) педагогическому институту / Бехтерев В.Ф., Красноярский гос. ун-т, Красноярск: 2000. — 136 с.
- Румянцев М. В., Семенова Е. В., Семенов В. И. История Енисейского педагогического института как фактологическая основа изучения культурно-исторического наследия Енисейска / Современные проблемы науки и образования // ООО "Издательский дом "Академия естествознания", Кубанский государственный медицинский университет, Камская государственная инженерно-экономическая академия, Кемеровский государственный университет. — 2016. — № 6. — 304 с.

== Sources ==
- "оф.сайт".
- "Дорога длиною в 40 лет". Заря Енисея.
- "Лесосибирский педагогический институт 80 лет на ниве высшего образования".
