= Zmiivska thermal power plant =

Thermal power plant in Kharkiv, Ukraine

Coordinates: 49°35′06″N 36°31′30″E

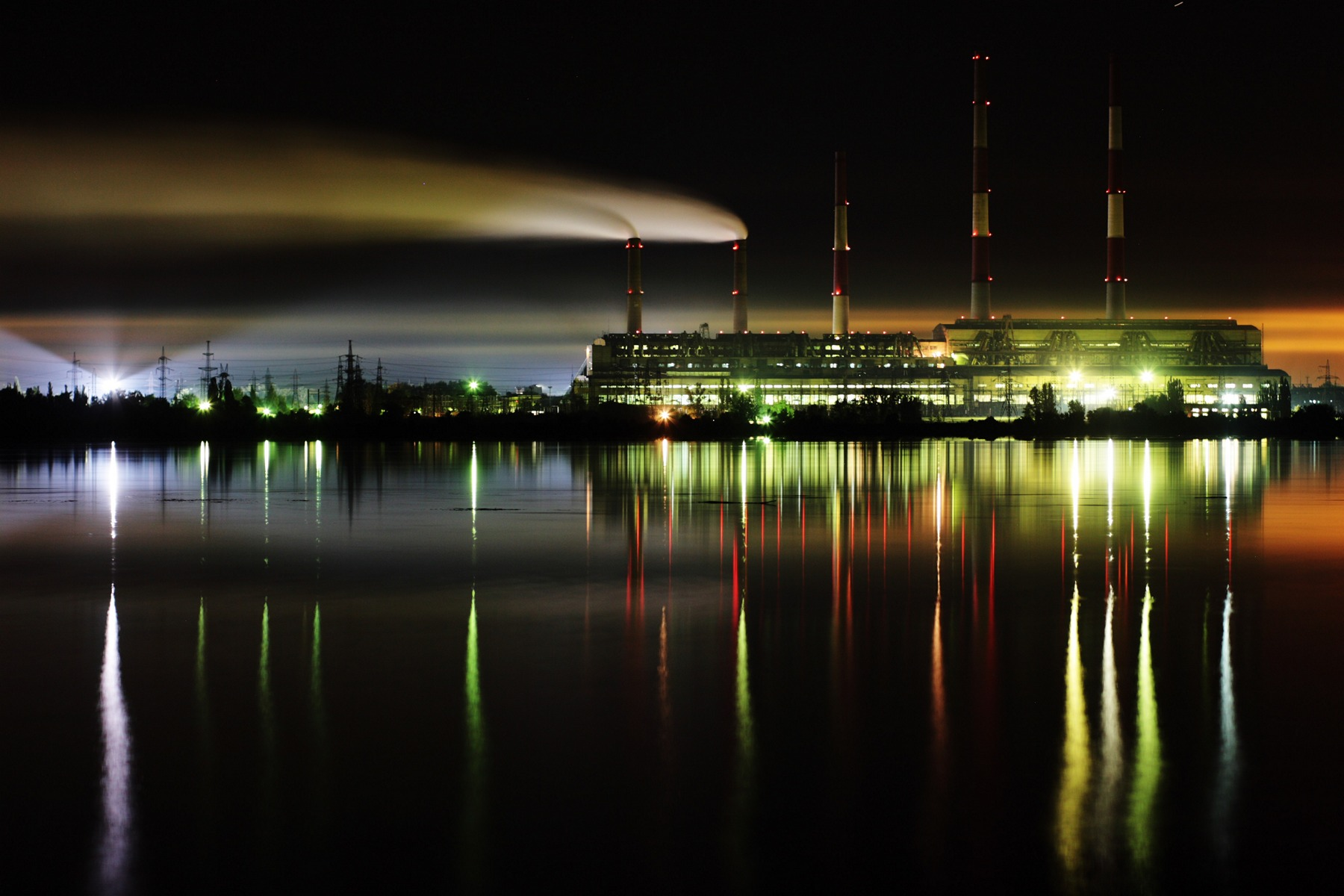
Zmiivska thermal power plant in 2007

The Zmiivska thermal power station (Ukrainian: Зміївська ТЕС) was a large thermal power plant (TEC) in Slobozhanske, Chuhuiv Raion, Kharkiv Oblast, Ukraine. It was one of Ukraine's largest power plants. It is operated by Centrenergo. It had an installed capacity of 2,400 MWe and was mostly fuelled by coal. The plant was mostly destroyed during the 22 March 2024 Russian strikes on Ukraine.

== History ==
The construction of the power plant was approved in 1955 and it started operations in 1960.

During the Russian invasion of Ukraine, the plant was damaged by Russian shelling in September 2022. Four civilian workers at the power plant were killed, and electricity and water delivery was affected. The damage was repaired later.

In 2023, the plant was fortified against war damage, with additions of protective structures around critical elements of the plant's facilities, which was supposed to protect them against "rocket fragments, indirect UAV attacks" and similar threats.

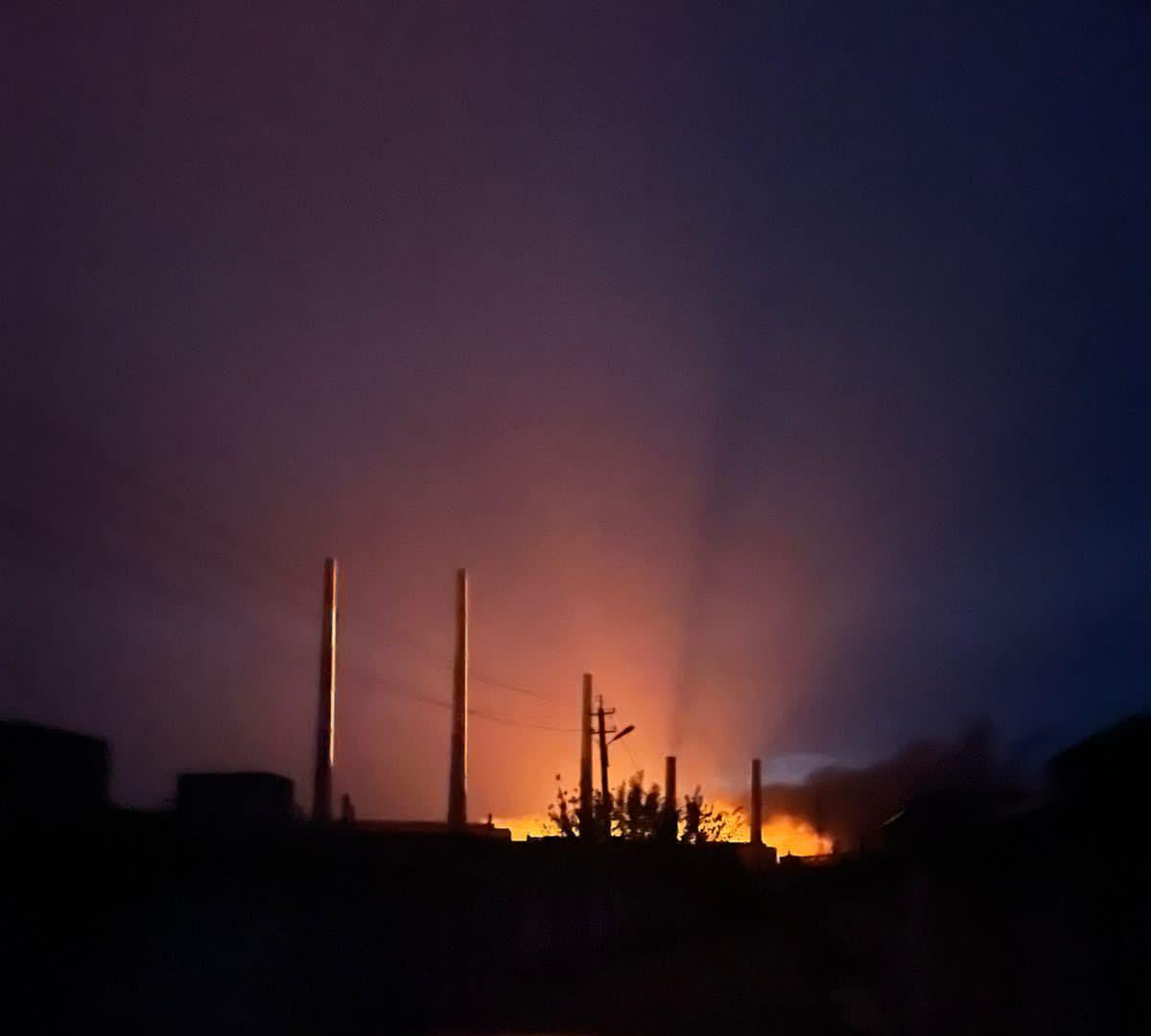
Zmiivska thermal power plant after Russian shelling, 11 September 2022

During the 22 March 2024 Russian strikes on Ukraine, the plant sustained major damage due to Russian bombardment, and has since been described as "destroyed". Centrenergo, who operates the plant, noted that due to extensive damage, repairs will take a long time and require international aid.

In the immediate aftermath of the attack, power outages affected some 700,000 of the region inhabitants; several days later, over 100,000 were still affected and an hourly blackout schedule had to be implemented. Zmiivska plant was one of several energy infrastructure objects damaged during the 22 March attacks; three days after the attack, the combined heat and power plant Kharkiv TEC-5 was stated to have ceased operation due to the damage it had suffered during the attack.

== See also ==
- Russian strikes against Ukrainian infrastructure (2022–present)
- Slobozhanske, Chuhuiv Raion, Kharkiv Oblast
