= Slobozhanske, Chuhuiv Raion, Kharkiv Oblast =

City in Kharkiv Oblast, Ukraine

Slobozhanske Слобожанське
- City
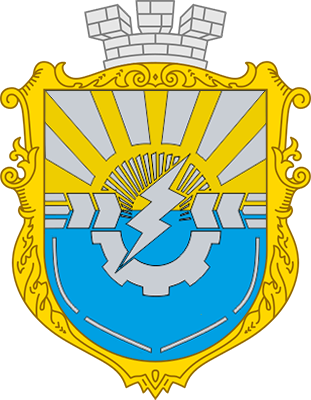
- Coat of arms
- Interactive map of Slobozhanske
- Location in Kharkiv Oblast Location in Ukraine
- Coordinates: 49°35′46″N 36°31′37″E
- Country: Ukraine
- Oblast: Kharkiv Oblast
- Raion: Chuhuiv Raion
- Hromada: Slobozhanske urban hromada

Population (2022)
  - Total: 13,675
- Time zone: UTC+2 (EET)
  - Summer (DST): UTC+3 (EEST)

Slobozhanske (Ukrainian: Слобожанське; Russian: Слобожанское) is a city in Chuhuiv Raion of Kharkiv Oblast in Ukraine. It is located in the valley of the Donets, on its left bank. Slobozhanske hosts the administration of Slobozhanske urban hromada, one of the hromadas of Ukraine. Population: 13,675 (2022 estimate).

== Geography ==
The city is located at the Siversky Donets river valley and is located at Lake Lyman.

The populated place is located on territory that in the past was known as Sloboda Ukraine.

== History ==
The appearance of the populated place is connected with the construction of the Zmiivska thermal power plant in 1956 and was considered as the so-called Komsomol shock construction project. In 1957, the first two streets were established, and in 1958, a local train station was built.

Until 4 February 2016, the settlement was known as Komsomolske. On that day, Verkhovna Rada adopted a decision to rename Komsomolske to Slobozhanske according to the law prohibiting names of Communist origin. The settlement filed a case stating that the opinions of the inhabitants have been ignored; the court decided against the settlement and kept the new name.

Until 18 July 2020, Slobozhanske belonged to Zmiiv Raion. The raion was abolished in July 2020 as part of the administrative reform of Ukraine, which reduced the number of raions in Kharkiv Oblast to seven. The area of Zmiiv Raion was merged into Chuhuiv Raion.

Until 26 January 2024, Slobozhanske was designated urban-type settlement. Since there was no Law of Ukraine defining such status for a populated place as urban-type settlement (Law of the Soviet Union), on that day, Slobozhanske's status was redefined as a settlement. A community discussion in 2023–2024 has concluded that Slobozhanske should become a city and should be renamed to Slobozhansk. In the discussions participated 854 people. On 7 May 2024, the draft resolution on granting Slobozhanske city status was registered. On 13 March 2025, the Verkhovna Rada granted the city status to Slobozhanske.

== Economy ==
=== Transportation ===
Slobozhanske railway station, close to the settlement, is on the railway connecting Kharkiv and Lyman via Izium. There is some passenger traffic.

Slobozhanske is connected by roads to Kharkiv and Izium. Through the city runs a local road, P78, which runs parallel to the highway M03 between the above-mentioned cities.

Zmiivska thermal power plant is located here.

== Culture ==
=== Sport ===
There is a local football club, "Enerhetyk," which is financed by the Zmiivska thermal power station. The club competes in regional competitions and sometimes at national amateur competitions.
