= Krasnoyarsk State University =

University in Krasnoyarsk, Siberia, Russia

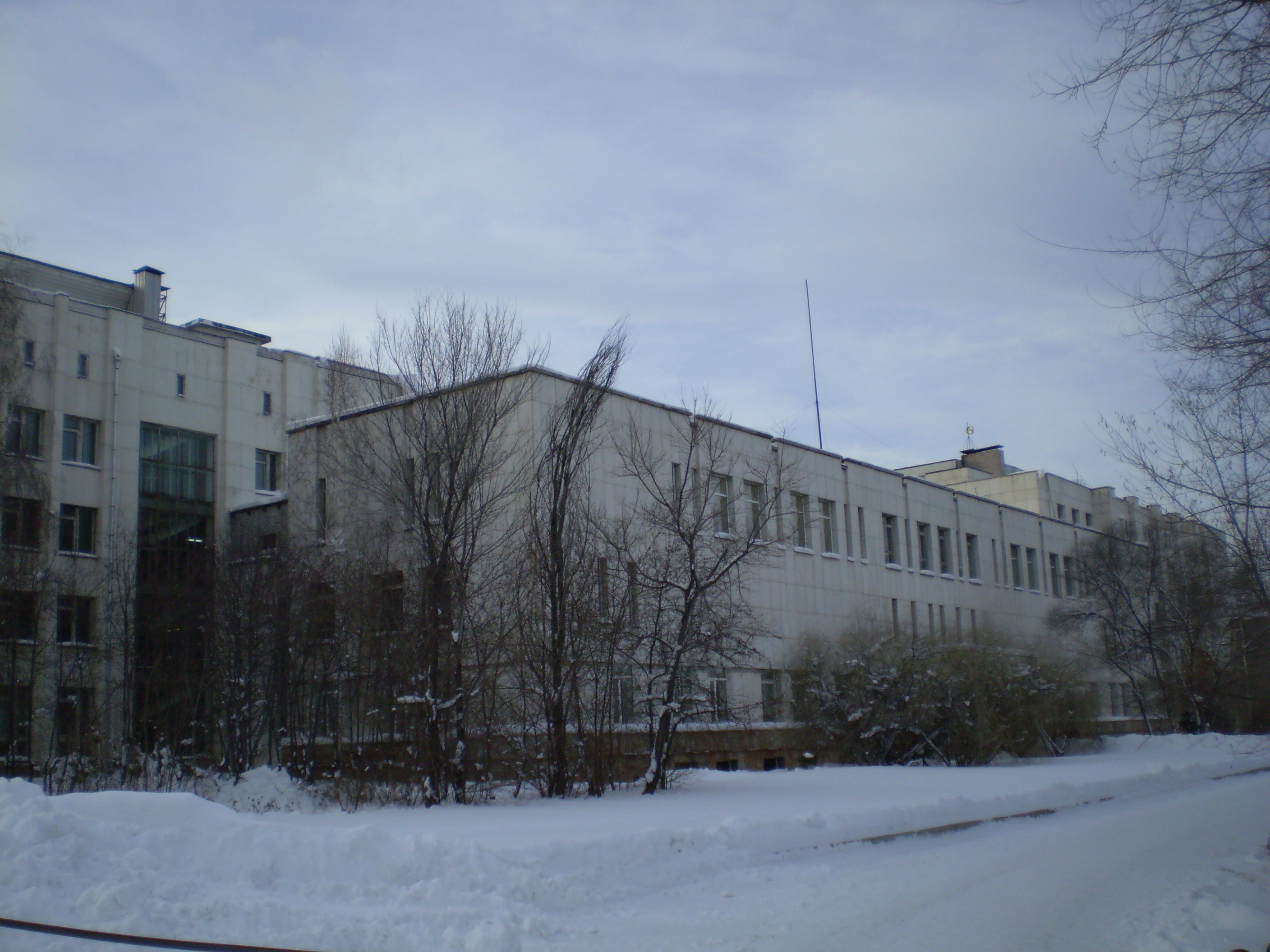
- Established: 1963
- Academic staff: 720 lecturers
- Students: 12,500
- Location: Krasnoyarsk, Russia

Krasnoyarsk State University was founded in 1963 in Krasnoyarsk, Siberia, Russia.

By 2005, the university had trained more than 20 thousand specialists and had about 12.5 thousand students and graduate students. By this time, 1353 employees worked at the university, of which 720 were teachers. Krasnoyarsk State University had 44 doctors of sciences and professors, 230 candidates of sciences and associate professors, seventeen full members and corresponding members of various Russian and international academies. Students from ten countries studied at KSU.

By 2006, Krasnoyarsk State University trained specialists in 13 areas and 42 specialties – mathematics, physics, biology, economics, law, philology, etc. Education was conducted at 12 faculties and 72 departments. About eight thousand full-time students studied at the university, more than a hundred professors and doctors of sciences, more than three hundred candidates of sciences and seven hundred teachers worked at KSU. Most of the lecturers of natural science faculties were Doctors and Candidates of Sciences working in research institutes of Akademgorodok. International relations have been established with many universities in Europe, the United States and Australia.

Correspondence natural science school, botanical garden, gymnasium No. 1 "Univers", academic library, research department, research engineering center "Crystal", engineering center "Khimpribor" worked at the university. The university was a member of the Russian Bar Association.

In November 2006 it merged with other 3 universities and became an Institute of Arts and Sciences within newly formed Siberian Federal University.

== Notable alumni ==
- Svetlana Khustik, journalist.
