= Rivne strikes (2022–present) =

2022 missile strikes in Ukraine

Coordinates: 50.74°N 26.35°E

- Part of the Russian invasion of Ukraine
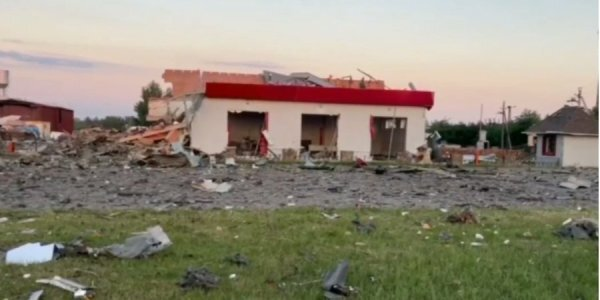
- Automobile repair shop in Sarny hit by a missile attack on June 25, 2022
Date	February 25, 2022 – present
Location	Rivne Oblast
Russia	Ukraine

Units involved
Armed Forces of the Russian Federation	Armed Forces of Ukraine Territorial Defense Forces

Casualties and losses
- at least 25 civilians dead and 17 wounded by Russian strikes

The Rivne strikes were carried out by Russian troops on the city of Rivne and the Rivne Oblast during the Russian invasion of Ukraine.

== 2022 strikes ==
=== February ===
On February 25, a rocket attack was reported on the Rivne airport.

On February 27, air defense forces successfully eliminated a Russian drone. However, as a result of the explosion, the lyceum and the farm, which is located nearby in the village of Velykyi Zholudsk, were damaged

=== March ===
On March 14, Russian troops carried out two airstrikes against the Rivne TV Tower, as a result of which 21 people were killed and 9 were injured. Rockets hit the television tower and administrative buildings nearby. On March 16, an airstrike happened on Sarny, Rivne region, there were no victims.

On March 21, two rockets hit a training ground in the Rivne region On March 26, an oil depot in Dubno was shelled. On March 28, there was an explosion at an oil depot in Klevan.

=== April ===
On April 25, three missiles hit the railway infrastructure of the Rivne region. As a result, 20 private houses were destroyed or damaged. One man was also injured in the shelling.

=== May ===
In the afternoon of May 21, the Russian military launched a missile attack on military targets in the Rivne region, there were no casualties.

=== June ===
On June 25, a rocket attack was carried out on civilian infrastructure in the city of Sarny, at least four people were killed and seven others were injured.

=== August ===
On the evening of August 28, in Sarny, several explosions were reported during an air raid, the city was hit by a rocket attack from the Russian Armed Forces for the third time. According to the head of the Rivne Regional State Administration, V. Koval, a total of four missile strikes on military infrastructure were recorded. There were no casualties. About 30 residential buildings and the premises of the central district hospital were damaged by the shock wave.

=== October ===
On October 10, the head of the Rivne Oblast, Vitaly Koval, informed that two missiles and one drone were shot down over the region. On the evening of October 12, a Russian target was shot down during an air alert in the north of the Rivne region. Vitaliy Koval did not specify whether it was a missile or a drone. On the morning of October 22, 2022, Russian troops launched a missile attack on energy infrastructure, as a result of the attack, electric substations were damaged. There were no casualties. The enterprise Rivneazot had an emergency shutdown due to shelling.

=== November ===
In the evening of November 15, Russian troops launched a missile attack on a critical infrastructure object, according to preliminary information, there were no casualties.

== 2023 strikes ==
=== August ===
On the night of August 11, Rivne region suffered a massive attack by drones, an oil depot was destroyed, there were no victims.

=== September ===
On September 21, as a result of Russian missile strikes, energy and civil infrastructure in Rivne were hit, no people were injured.

== 2024 strikes ==
=== July ===
Russian troops attacked an energy facility in the Rivne region with UAVs at night, the Ukrenergo company reports.

According to the report, in some areas, household and industrial consumers were cut off. Currently, the power supply has been restored, restoration works are ongoing.

==== November ====
On November 17, 2024, at least 6 explosions rang out in Rivne, the target of the enemy was an object of critical infrastructure, neighboring residential buildings were also damaged, windows were broken there.

On November 28, 2024, explosions rang out in Rivne during an air raid, as a result of the attack, more than 280,000 subscribers remained without electricity in the region. There are also water outages. In addition, the blast wave damaged windows and balcony frames in 2 residential buildings.

==== December ====
On the night of December 3, the Russian army struck an energy infrastructure facility in the Rivne region, without casualties or damage
