= 17 November 2024 Russian strikes on Ukraine =

- Part of the Russian strikes against Ukrainian infrastructure
- Location: Regions across Ukraine
- Date: 17 November 2024
- Attack type: Airstrikes
- Deaths: 7
- Perpetrator: Russian Armed Forces

During the morning of 17 November 2024, Russia launched a massive air attack on cities across Ukraine, killing two people in Mykolaiv, two in Nikopol, two in Odesa and one person in Lviv. According to the Ukrainian President Volodymyr Zelenskyy, about 120 missiles and 90 drones were fired overnight and in the early morning. The strikes targeted Ukraine's energy grid in an effort to disrupt power supply during the upcoming winter. It was the biggest Russian aerial attack on Ukraine since August 2024 with reports of attacks on the critical infrastructure of Lviv Oblast, Ivano-Frankivsk Oblast and Rivne Oblast in Western Ukraine as well as on the cities of Kryvyi Rih, Vinnytsia, Odesa and Kyiv.

In the evening, a Russian missile struck a nine-story residential building in Sumy, killing 11 people including two children. 89 more people were injured.

The Ukrainian Air Force claimed to have shot down 102 missiles and 42 drones.

== Strikes ==
=== Locations ===
17 November 2024 Russian strikes on Ukraine
Airstrike target	Damage information
Kremenchuk Hydroelectric Power Plant	The hydroelectric power plant was struck by at least one missile.
Odesa	2 killed, 1 injured. Water and power to the city were cut.

=== Timeline ===
As a result of the Russian airstrikes, the Polish Air Force scrambled its fighter aircraft.
