= 2024 Lukoil oil transit dispute =

Slovak-Hungarian diplomatic dispute against Ukraine oil sanctions

Logo of PJSC Lukoil

The Lukoil oil transit dispute was an international relations dispute between Ukraine and the European Union at odds with Hungary and Slovakia regarding the allowance of the pipeline transfer of Russian oil Lukoil through Ukrainian territory. The diplomatic standoff arose when on 24 June 2024, Ukraine tightened sanctions, which were imposed on 21 June 2018, against Lukoil — Russia's largest private oil firm — which included a ban on Lukoil on oil supplies and the assignment of its contractual obligations to supply oil to Hungary and Slovakia through the Druzhba pipeline to other companies. Despite the fact that the tightening of sanctions against Lukoil did not affect the volume of oil transit through Ukraine, pro-Russian officials in Hungary and Slovakia complained of a probability energy crisis and economic collapse to the European Commission while threatening to halt military aid shipments, energy, and diesel supplies to Ukraine. However, the European Commission, after examining the situation, saw no reason for concern. The dispute had no legal consequences and turned into demagoguery.

== Background ==
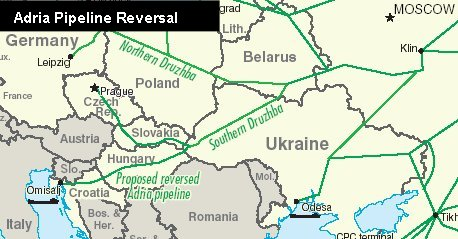
Map of the Druzhba pipeline

In 2014, Ukraine entered into the European Union Association Agreement, marking a significant step towards closer ties with the West following the initial Euromaidan protests. Following Russia's invasion of Ukraine in 2022, the European Union began reducing its dependence on Russian energy supplies. However, Hungary and Slovakia were granted special exemptions from the EU ban on pipeline-transferred Russian oil, which intended to allow landlocked countries such as the Czech Republic time to seek alternative energy sources. Despite this, Hungary increased its oil and natural gas trade with Russia during the invasion, with Slovakia maintaining significant reliance on Russian oil imports.

Hungarian PM Viktor Orbán was the first EU leader to visit Moscow to meet with Vladimir Putin in a visit he called "a peacekeeping mission" during the prelude to the invasion, which was followed by a second visit and meeting in early July 2024 which was also dubbed by him as a "peace mission". Orbán's government is notable for regularly blocking and delayed the EU's efforts to grant financial and military aid to Ukraine and to imposing sanctions on Russia. Orbán was frequently critical of NATO and EU for Ukraine, previously delaying agreement on a substantial EU aid package intended to provide Ukraine military assistance in its defense against Russia. He has argued that Russia's superior resources and human resources would make it unbeatable on the battlefield, a position poorly received by Ukrainians and EU governments from the fear that a ceasefire would only solidify Russia's hold over its seized territories. The Hungarian government opposed Ukraine's bids to join NATO and the EU, complicating their otherwise unified response to the Russian invasion of Ukraine.

Similarly, Prime Minister of Slovakia Robert Fico campaigned in the 2023 Slovak parliamentary election on an Eurosceptic platform, halting military aid to Ukraine and pushing for friendly relations with Russia, while criticizing NATO and the United States.

== Sanctions ==
On 24 June 2024, Volodymyr Zelenskyy and the Ukrainian government decided to impose sanctions on Lukoil, Russia's largest private oil firm. The sanctions were aimed at reducing Russia's oil revenue, which Ukraine reported was important in funding the ongoing Russian invasion of Ukraine. This move halted oil transit across the nation. It effectively blocked oil passage from Lukoil's pipeline to Central Europe, thus abruptly partially negating Hungary's and Slovakia's exemption, allowing them extra time to reduce their dependence on Russian oil supplies. As a direct result of the sanctions, Lukoil began to stop pumping oil into the pipeline due to concerns about potential asset seizure by Ukraine.

=== Impacts ===
At the time of the sanctions, Hungary sourced 70% of its oil from Russia, with Lukoil supplying half of that amount. Slovakia's dependence was more pronounced, with 88% of its crude imports coming from Russia in 2023. According to the Slovak government, its Slovnaft refinery owned by the Hungarian oil and gas conglomerate MOL was estimated to receive 40% less oil than it required, stating that it would not only negatively impact the Slovak economy, but also the flow of diesel supplies destined for Ukraine as well. The Hungarian government convened a working group to address oil supply security concerns in response to the sanctions.

Kpler intelligence firm head of analytics Viktor Katona reported the sudden energy blockage could quickly lead to a crisis in energy security for both Hungary and Slovakia, contradicting claims by the EU and Ukraine that the sanctions would not significantly affect their oil supply. He noted that although the flow of oil wasn't prominently impacted by the sanctions initially, there was a "notable gap in supply" that arose at the end of July 2024, indicating a decreasing level of oil flow that he urged the EU to take a strong position towards.

== Dispute ==
The Ukrainian sanctions and blockage of oil transport immediately prompted both Hungary and Slovakia to appeal to the European Union, claiming that Ukraine was violating its European Union Association Agreement and jeopardizing its energy security, which could cause a national energy crisis and an economic crisis in both states. Hungary and Slovakia issued complaints to the European Commission, threatening unilateral repercussions if their concerns were not addressed, which included blocking EU defense funds and military aid shipments to Ukraine, as well as halting their own energy and diesel exports to Ukraine.

Prime Minister of Slovakia Robert Fico held a telephone conversation with Prime Minister of Ukraine Denys Shmyhal where he strongly asserted that Slovakia would not allow itself to become a "hostage" to Ukrainian-Russian relations. He stated that "senseless sanctions" on Lukoil would not damage Russia's economy and would instead negatively impact both Ukraine and several EU member states.

On 23 July, Hungarian Foreign Minister Péter Szijjártó declared that Hungary, until Kyiv reversed its sanctions, would block the disbursement of €6.5 billion into the European Peace Facility (EPF), a fund designed to reimburse EU nation states for military aid provided to Ukraine. On 26 July, Gergely Gulyás, Viktor Orbán's Chief of Staff, accused Ukraine of "inexplicably blackmailing Hungary and Slovakia" in response to both nations' "pro-peace stance", in reference to peace talks held by Viktor Orban with Vladimir Putin in early July and Robert Fico's open conversation with Russian officials. He stated that a solution to the potential energy crisis needed to be found by September 2024.

=== Reciprocal measures ===
Following a meeting with President of Russia Vladimir Putin in Moscow on 22 December, Slovak Prime Minister Robert Fico announced that Slovakia was considering implementing reciprocal measures against Ukraine, including the suspension of emergency electricity supplies. This threat overlapped with the concurrent Ukrainian energy crisis caused by Russian attacks on Ukrainian power infrastructure, forcing Ukraine to rely on electricity imports from neighboring countries since late 2022.

=== European Union responses ===
In response to these complaints, European Commission officials publicly assured that they would review the matter and facilitate a resolution, while also stating that there was no immediate threat to the EU's general oil supply security. Privately, they expressed frustration with Hungary and Slovakia's continued dependence on Russian oil. The commission slated the dispute for further discussion in the EU's trade policy committee, with European Commissioner for Trade Valdis Dombrovskis stating that officials would not immediately back Hungary or Slovakia without first gathering evidence and determining if a legal case could realistically be made. Eleven EU nation states backed Dombrovskis's statement, with zero backing Hungary and Slovakia. One European diplomat voiced that a security clause in the EU's Ukraine trade agreement could permit the Ukrainian government to halt supplies to the EU as needed based on their own sanctions.

=== Ukrainian responses ===
Ukraine's largest state energy company Naftogaz insisted that the sanctions against Lukoil were justified and maintained that European oil supplies had not been affected, stating that oil supplies in July had remained consistent in comparison to prior months. Ukrainian statesman and Naftogaz CEO Oleksiy Chernyshov de-emphasized Hungary's and Slovakia's fears of an energy crisis as more political than practical in nature. Ukrainian president Volodymyr Zelenskyy retorted that the ban on Lukoil oil transit was in accordance with its sanctions against the Russian company, and not related to blackmail against Hungary or Slovakia for blocking military aid to Ukraine prior to the dispute.

Following threats from Hungary to block the EPF fund, the Ukrainian Foreign Ministry did not immediately respond to requests for comments. On 30 July, the Ukrainian Foreign Affairs Ministry expressed willingness to join talks with the European Commission in order to maintain cooperation with Hungary and Slovakia.

On 31 July, Prime Minister of Ukraine Denys Shmyhal reiterated that their sanctions would not affect Slovakia or Europe in general, and thus stated that removing them was "not a matter for discussion". He stated that Ukraine was dependable in transporting resources to "all countries that value freedom and the rule of law", and that the biggest cause of any energy crisis to "the Slovak people" would be by Russia due to its "hybrid energy war... its blackmailing and political ultimatums". He referred to Slovakia as a "reliable partner", and stated that its "blackmail and threats" against Ukraine while the nation was "defending itself against the aggressor, so that the terrorist state can continue to earn its bloody excess profits" was unexpected and that it represented "a dubious path".

Following Slovak threats of reciprocal measures and cutting off electricity supplies, Ukrainian President Volodymyr Zelenskyy responded on 28 December, accusing the Slovak President Robert Fico of acting on Moscow's orders to create a "second energy front" against Ukraine. Zelenskyy emphasized that Slovakia provided 19% of Ukraine's power imports and argued that, as part of the European single energy market, Slovakia was obligated to adhere to common European regulations.

=== Engagements with Russia ===
On 20 July, Hungarian Foreign Minister Peter Szijjártó met with Russian Foreign Minister Sergey Lavrov to explore alternative oil supply options and potential solutions towards circumventing Ukrainian sanctions.

On 29 July, Szijjártó engaged in a phone call with the Russian and Slovak foreign ministers discussing the oil transit ban, further stating publicly that Ukraine was endangering Hungary's energy security, and thus was violating the European Union's association agreement.

== External reactions ==
On 30 July, the Russian Foreign Ministry accused Ukraine of converting “the transit of energy resources into a literal button for manipulating people, countries and nations.”

== See also ==
- Economic impact of the Russian invasion of Ukraine
- Nord Stream pipelines sabotage
- Ukrainian energy crisis
