= Khmelnytskyi strikes (2022–present) =

Russian missile strikes in Khmelnytskyi, Ukraine

Shelling of Khmelnytskyi
- Part of Russian invasion of Ukraine
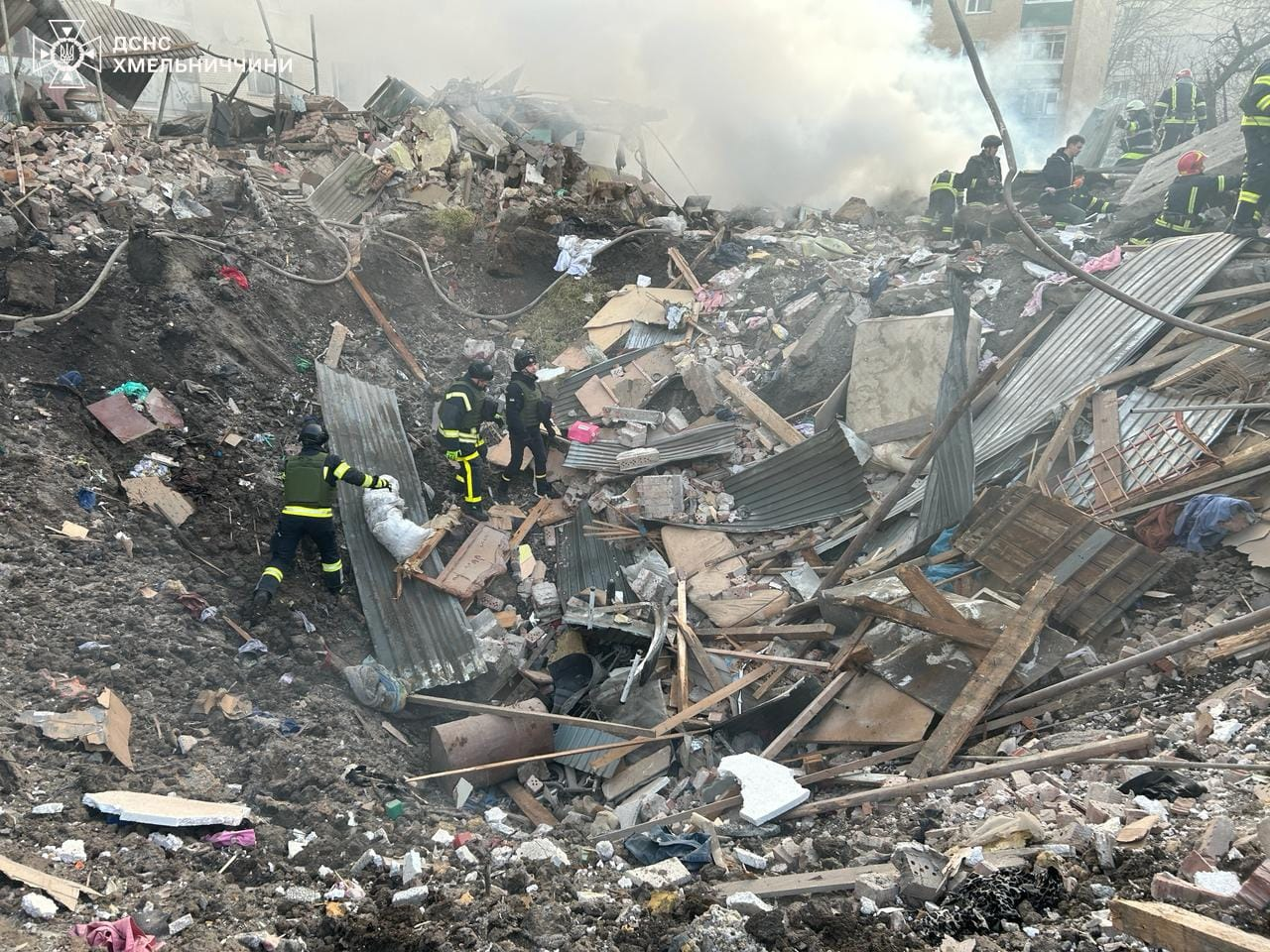
Date	March 29, 2022 – present
Location	Khmelnytskyi and Khmelnytskyi Oblast
Status	Ongoing

Belligerents
Russia	Ukraine

Units involved
Russian Armed Forces	Armed Forces of Ukraine

The shelling of Khmelnytskyi and the region began after the start of the Russian invasion of Ukraine.

== Course of events ==
=== 2022 ===
At 23:50 on March 29, several explosions sounded during the air raid alarm in Khmelnytskyi. The city, for the first time since the full-scale war, was subjected to a missile strike. The target of the Russians was an infrastructure facility. According to Mayor Oleksandr Simchyshyn, there were no casualties, a fire broke out at the scene of the attack, which was localized.

On June 25, in the Khmelnytsky region, air defense forces shot down two Russian missiles. The wreckage of one of the missiles fell in a forest in Kamyanets-Podilskyi district.

In the morning of July 24, during another rocket attack, several explosions occurred, 3 cruise missiles of the Russian army were shot down by air defense forces over the Khmelnytsky region.

On October 6, the Russians conducted another missile attack on the region, with no casualties.

On October 10, a massive rocket attack took place throughout Ukraine, affecting the Khmelnytsky region. In the regional center, three missile strikes damaged a substation, causing power and water outages in the city for two days. There were no casualties among the population. It was also reported that several missiles were shot down over the territory of the region.

On the morning of October 22, during the air raid alarm, Russian forces launched a missile strike on energy infrastructure. In several settlements of the region, the power went out.

On October 31, a Russian missile was shot down over the territory of the Khmelnytskyi region. The wreckage hit private housing, there were no casualties.

On November 15, two missiles struck Khmelnytskyi. The Russian missiles hit energy infrastructure, part of the city was left without electricity.

On December 31, the Russians conducted two missile attacks on Khmelnytskyi, part of the city was left without electricity, more than 8 people were wounded. As a result of injuries, one girl died. 8 civilian cars, 13 residential buildings and warehouses were also damaged.

=== 2023 ===
On February 10, at about 4 a.m., Iranian kamikaze drones attacked an energy infrastructure facility in one of the communities of Shepetivka district. On the same day, a Russian missile hit a critical infrastructure facility in Khmelnytskyi. There were no casualties among the population, half of the city was left without electricity. A missile and a drone were shot down over the region.

On February 18, Russian ships fired four missiles at Ukraine from the Black Sea, two of which were shot down and two others hit a military facility and a public transport stop in Khmelnytskyi. As a result of the attack, two people were injured, ten high-rise buildings, three educational institutions, one civilian car were damaged; The shock wave broke one and a half thousand windows.

On the night of February 27, Khmelnytsky was attacked by three kamikaze drones, several buildings were damaged, a SES rescuer who was extinguishing a fire from arrival was killed; Four people were injured: later one of them, a firefighter, died of his injuries in the hospital.

On the morning of May 13, at 4:17, the Russian forces with the help of Iranian-made drones attacked a military facility in the Black Island community. After hitting the facility, a series of high-power detonations occurred. The shock wave damaged educational institutions, medical institutions, administrative buildings, industrial facilities, multi-story and private residential buildings in the territory of the Chornoostrovska and Khmelnytskyi communities. Near the village of Gruzevitsa, railway tracks were damaged, which delayed the movement of trains. About 30 people were wounded.

Explosions occurred on the territory of the 649th aviation storage of missile weapons and ammunition. It is known from open sources that a large number of obsolete aerial bombs were stored here, the UOSM-DM enterprise from the Ukroboronservice warehouse, where expired ammunition was disposed of is also located here. Satellite imagery shows that the area was completely destroyed.

On the night of June 12–13, air defense forces were working during the air raid alarm to shoot down missiles. Rocket debris damaged 6 residential buildings. There were no injuries or deaths.

On the night of June 20–21, air defense forces shot down 6 drones. The wreckage of one of them fell on a private residential building.

On the night of June 22–23, the wreckage of a downed rocket fell near private housing in Khmelnytskyi. In one of the communities of the Khmelnytskyi district, several residential buildings were damaged by the shock wave.

On the night of August 18–19, Russian drones once again attacked Khmelnytskyi with Shahed-136/131 UAVs. 15 of the 17 drones were shot down on the territory of the region, but the shock wave damaged civilian structures in the territory of Khmelnytskyi, Medzhibizka and Derazhnyansk communities. Two women were injured by fragments of glass, 6 others went to the hospital due to shock. The Medzhybizh Fortress was also damaged: glass, doors and the roof of the fortress were broken.

On the night of October 25–26, the Air Defense Forces of Ukraine destroyed all 11 "Shahed-136/131" during a night attack, 21 people were injured as a result of falling fragments of downed Russian UAVs on the territory of a critical infrastructure object in the Shepetivsky district of Khmelnytskyi.

At night, the Russians attacked the territory of the Khmelnytsky NPP. As a result of the explosion, the windows in the administrative and household and laboratory and household buildings were damaged. Due to damage to power transmission lines, 1,860 consumers in the cities of Slavuta and Netishyn of the Khmelnytskyi region were cut off. The head of the Ministry of Internal Affairs Ihor Klymenko explained that the wreckage of drones destroyed a number of buildings in the Shepetiv district, including 11 residential buildings, nine private buildings, two educational institutions, an administrative building, a shop and cars.

On the night of October 29, explosions rang out in the Khmelnytskyi region during an air raid alert, it was reported that the air defense was working, there were no casualties, and there was no damage. Serhii Tyurin, the first deputy head of the Khmelnytskyi OVA, said this: Earlier, the Air Force of the Ukrainian Armed Forces warned about the threat of kamikaze drone strikes in the region.

In the night from October 31 to November 1 in the Khmelnytskyi region, the fall of rocket fragments was recorded in several districts of Kamianets-Podilskyi and Khmelnytskyi . In the first, they fell in two places in the field.

Debris of another rocket fell in the Khmelnytskyi Raion. As a result of the fall, a fire broke out, the roof and windows of a civilian building were damaged. The fire has been extinguished, there are no casualties or injuries, according to the head of Khmelnytskyi OVA.

=== 2024 ===
On January 8, during the bombing in Khmelnytskyi, at least 6 explosions were heard, 3 missiles were shot down. A critical infrastructure object was hit in Khmelnytskyi, 3 people died.

On the morning of February 15, a rocket attack was carried out in the Khmelnytskyi region, as a result of which private and residential buildings were damaged, of which 1 private house was partially destroyed. 2 people, a man and a woman, were injured. Also, 1 cruise missile was shot down over the territory of the region. Serhii Tyurin, the first deputy of the OVA, announced this.
