= Chernihiv strikes (2022–present) =

Russian strikes on Chernihiv

The Russian Armed Forces have launched several rocket attacks on Chernihiv, Ukraine, during the Russian invasion of Ukraine.

== 2022 ==
=== 3 March 2022 Chernihiv bombing ===
On 3 March 2022, 47 people were killed in a series of airstrikes in Chernihiv by Russian forces during the siege of the city, during the 2022 Russian invasion of Ukraine. Amnesty International and Human Rights Watch described the strikes as a war crime.

Six unguided aerial bombs were filmed falling in a residential area in Chernihiv, in a triangular public square formed by Viacheslava Chornovila and Kruhova streets (51.5001°N 31.2791°E). Analysis by Amnesty International found that (at least) eight bombs fell. A witness living in Ivana Bohuna Street, Alina, heard a loud buzzing sound before the bombs exploded.

Ukrainian-born United States Congresswoman Victoria Spartz (IN-R) told reporters that her grandmother lived in a building nearby and the windows had all been destroyed.

The same day, two schools (No.18 and No.21) and 8 private houses were destroyed, and 7 more houses heavily damaged, in another place in Chernihiv, in the vicinity of Biloruskyi Lane.

=== 16 March 2022 Chernihiv breadline attack ===
On 16 March 2022, a Russian attack killed at least 18 and injured 26 civilians in Chernihiv, Ukraine, who were waiting in a line for bread.

The event was reported as well as the United States Embassy in Kyiv. The attack, which he described as a bombing, was "not the first such incoming shell, nor is it the first shelling of civilians by the enemy". The US Embassy reported that the people had been "shot and killed". 18 people were reported dead by local authorities. The incident happened at around 10:00 UTC+3. Victims of the incident were killed following a blast shot from heavy artillery. These civilians were unarmed and some of them survived the shelling; they were taken to medical facilities by Chernihiv police.

== 2023 ==
=== August 2023 Chernihiv missile strike ===
On 19 August 2023, Russian military forces launched an Iskander-M ballistic missile at the Taras Shevchenko Theater in downtown Chernihiv, Ukraine.

The theater was hosting an exhibition on the use of consumer drones in the Russian Invasion of Ukraine, titled "Lyuti Ptashky" (Angry Birds), which was described by its organisers as "a closed meeting of engineers, military and volunteers." Governor of Chernihiv Oblast, Vyacheslav Chaus, announced that 7 were dead, including a 6-year-old girl. Another 144 were injured, including 15 children and 15 policemen, with 41 injuries being grievous and requiring medical evacuations to a hospital.

== 2024 ==
=== April 2024 Chernihiv missile strike ===
On 17 April 2024, at around 9:00 am local time, the Russian military forces launched a missile strike against an eight-storey residential building in Chernihiv, Ukraine. Besides the direct hit against said residential building, another four high-rise buildings, a hospital, dozens of cars and a higher education institution were damaged. The attack killed 18 people, while 78 were injured. The attack came after a Ukrainian strike on a Russian military airfield in occupied Crimea. President of Ukraine Volodymyr Zelenskyy once again appealed to the West to provide Ukraine with air defence equipment, claiming the attack happened because Ukrainian Army was running out of defence missiles.

== 2025 ==
=== January 2025 Chernihiv missile strike ===
On 4 January 2025, three missiles hit a residential area in Chernihiv, killing one person, injuring five others and destroying two houses, they said. A picture posted by the regional governor showed the shattered facade of a private home.
