= 22 March 2024 Russian strikes on Ukraine =

Missile strike during the Russian invasion of Ukraine

March 2024 Ukraine missile strike
- Part of Russian strikes against Ukrainian infrastructure (2022–present)
- Location: Kharkiv, Zaporizhzhia, Kryvyi Rih, Khmelnytskyi, Poltava Oblast, Vinnytsia Oblast, Lviv Oblast, Ivano-Frankivsk Oblast, Mykolaiv Oblast, Odesa Oblast, Sumy Oblast and other parts of Ukraine
- Date: 22 March 2024
- Deaths: 5 civilians
- Injuries: 26
- Perpetrator: Russian Air Force

Fires on Ukrainian energy facilities after the strikes

In the morning hours of 22 March 2024, Russia carried out one of the largest missile and drone attacks against Ukraine in the series of similar Russian attacks during the ongoing Russo-Ukrainian War with 88 missiles and 63 drones. Kharkiv, Zaporizhzhia, Kryvyi Rih, Khmelnytskyi, Poltava Oblast, Vinnytsia Oblast, Lviv Oblast, Ivano-Frankivsk Oblast, Mykolaiv Oblast, Odesa Oblast, Sumy Oblast and other parts of the country were subjected to rocket fire by the Russian army. The Dnieper Hydroelectric Station was put out of action.

The attacks left over a million people without electricity. The head of Ukrenergo, Volodymyr Kudrytskyi, called the attack on the energy system the largest since the beginning of the full-scale invasion of the Russian army into the territory of sovereign Ukraine.

Three people were killed and 14 more were injured as a result of the Russian attack on Zaporizhzhia, one person died in the Dnieper Hydroelectric Station, and there were civilian casualties and injuries in Khmelnytskyi. Kharkiv was left without electricity.

== Course of events ==
On the night of March 22, 2024, an air raid alert was announced throughout the country. In the morning, the Russian military launched a massive missile strike on Ukraine.

According to the Ukrainian Air Force, the strike used 63 Shahed attack drones (55 of them were shot down), 12 Iskander-M ballistic missiles, 40 Kh-101/Kh-555 cruise missiles (35 were shot down), 5 Kh-22 cruise missiles, 7 Kinzhal missiles, 2 Kh-59 missiles (both shot down), 22 S-300/S-400 missiles. The missiles hit Ukrainian energy facilities.

=== Kharkiv ===
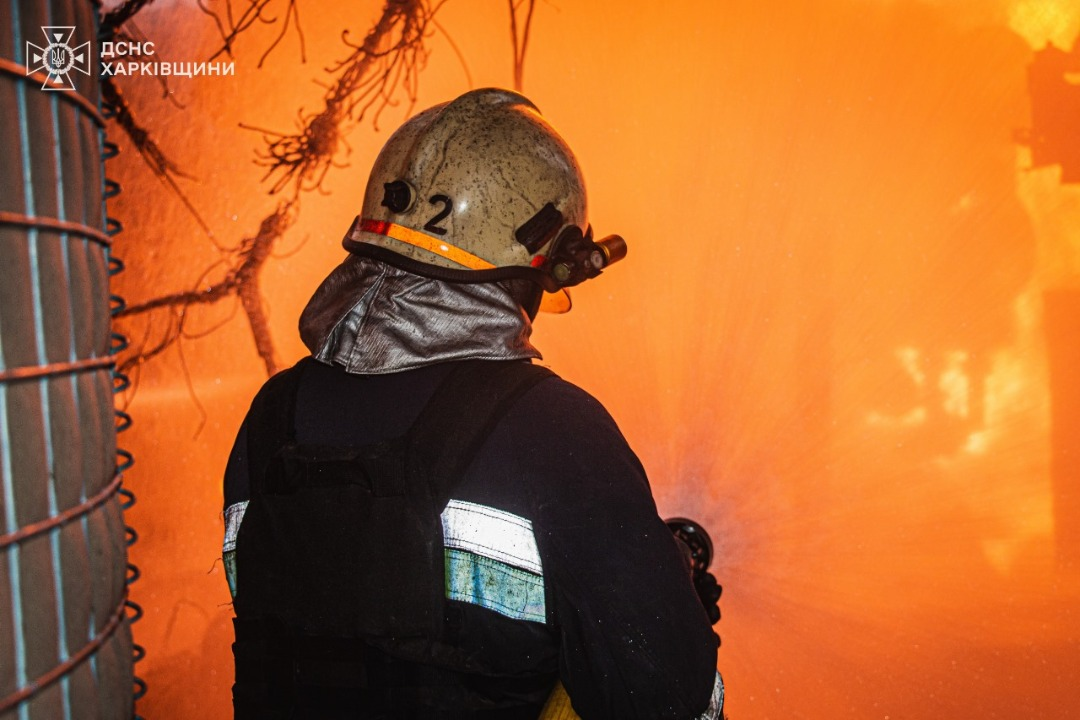
Fire at an energy infrastructure facility in Kharkiv region

In Kharkiv, the Russian military carried out more than 15 strikes on energy infrastructure facilities with S-300/Kh-22 missiles, according to the head of the regional military administration Oleh Syniehubov. The city was almost completely left without electricity and water supply. Zmiivska thermal power plant was reported to be nearly completely destroyed.

Three days after the attack the combined heat and power plant Kharkiv TEC-5 was stated to have ceased operation due to the damage it had suffered during the attack. The plant's management said that "the reconstruction process will last more than one year." Kharkiv was forced to rely on other regions of Ukraine for its energy needs.

=== Zaporizhzhia ===
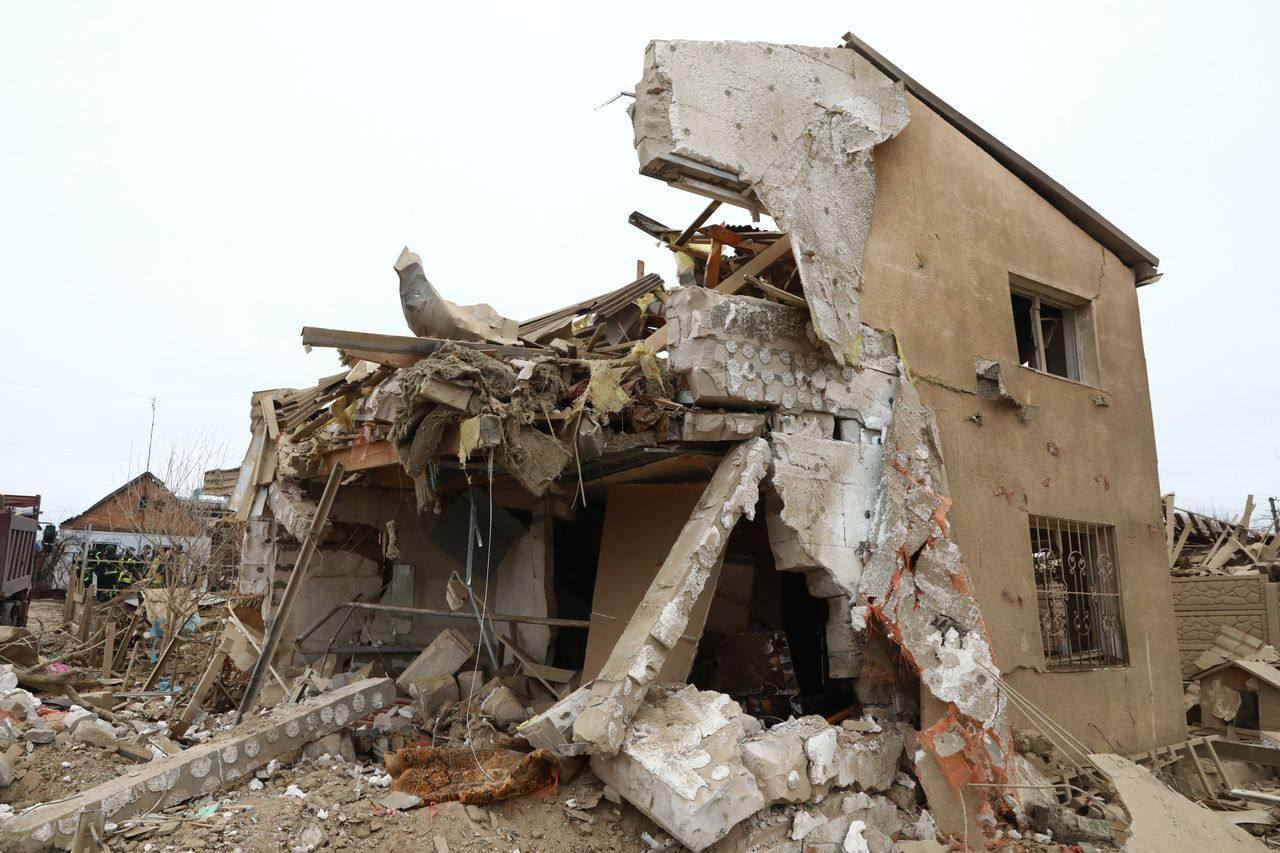
House in Zaporizhzhia after the attack

In Zaporizhzhia, the Russian military launched 12 missile strikes, according to the head of the regional administration, Ivan Fedorov. According to preliminary data, seven houses were destroyed and another 35 were damaged. Some people were wounded.

The Zaporizhzhia Nuclear Power Plant was nearly shut down due to the attack. During the attack, the external overhead power line "Dniprovska", which connects the nuclear power plant with the unified energy system of Ukraine, was switched off. Energoatom reported that the damaged power line was restored.

=== Kryvyi Rih ===
In Kryvyi Rih, Dnipropetrovsk Oblast, critical infrastructure facilities were damaged as a result of a combined attack by drones and missiles, according to the Head of the Military Administration Oleksandr Vilkul. The city introduced emergency shutdown schedules. Hospitals and other infrastructure began switching to generator power where possible.

=== Strike on the Dnieper Hydroelectric Station ===
According to Ukrhydroenergo, missiles hit hydraulic structures of the Dnieper Hydroelectric Station, causing a fire at the station. Authorities said there was no risk of a breach on the dam's structure. A Russian missile also hit a trolleybus that was traveling along the dam, according to Petro Andryushchenko, adviser to the legitimate mayor of Mariupol, adding that it was carrying civilians on their way to work. Traffic in the area of the dam was stopped.

CEO of Ukrhydroenergo Ihor Syrota said on Radio Free Europe/Radio Liberty that the Russian military hit the dam's two stations. According to him, the HPP-2 station was severely damaged, and it is unknown whether it will be possible to restore it. One of the station's supports was also hit and the crane beams were broken.

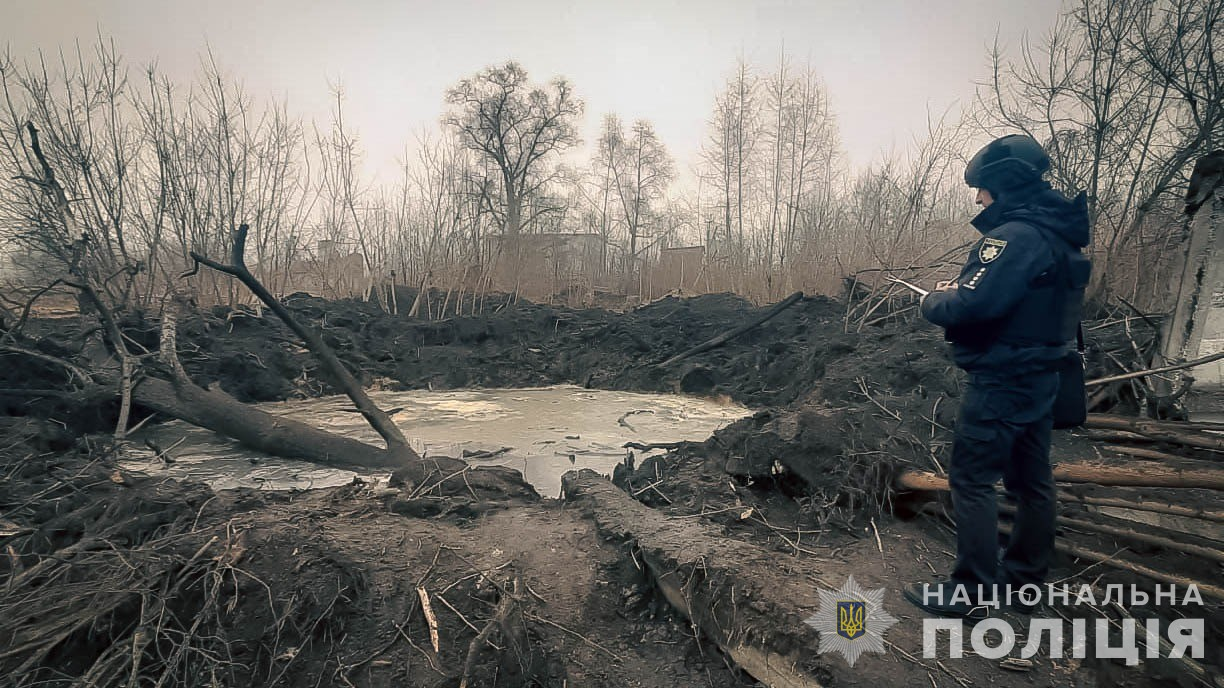
Crater in Sumy Oblast

=== Sumy Oblast ===
In Sumy Oblast, as a result of attacks on energy system facilities, emergency shutdown schedules were carried out in areas of Sumy, Konotop and Shostka Raions.

=== Khmelnytskyi ===
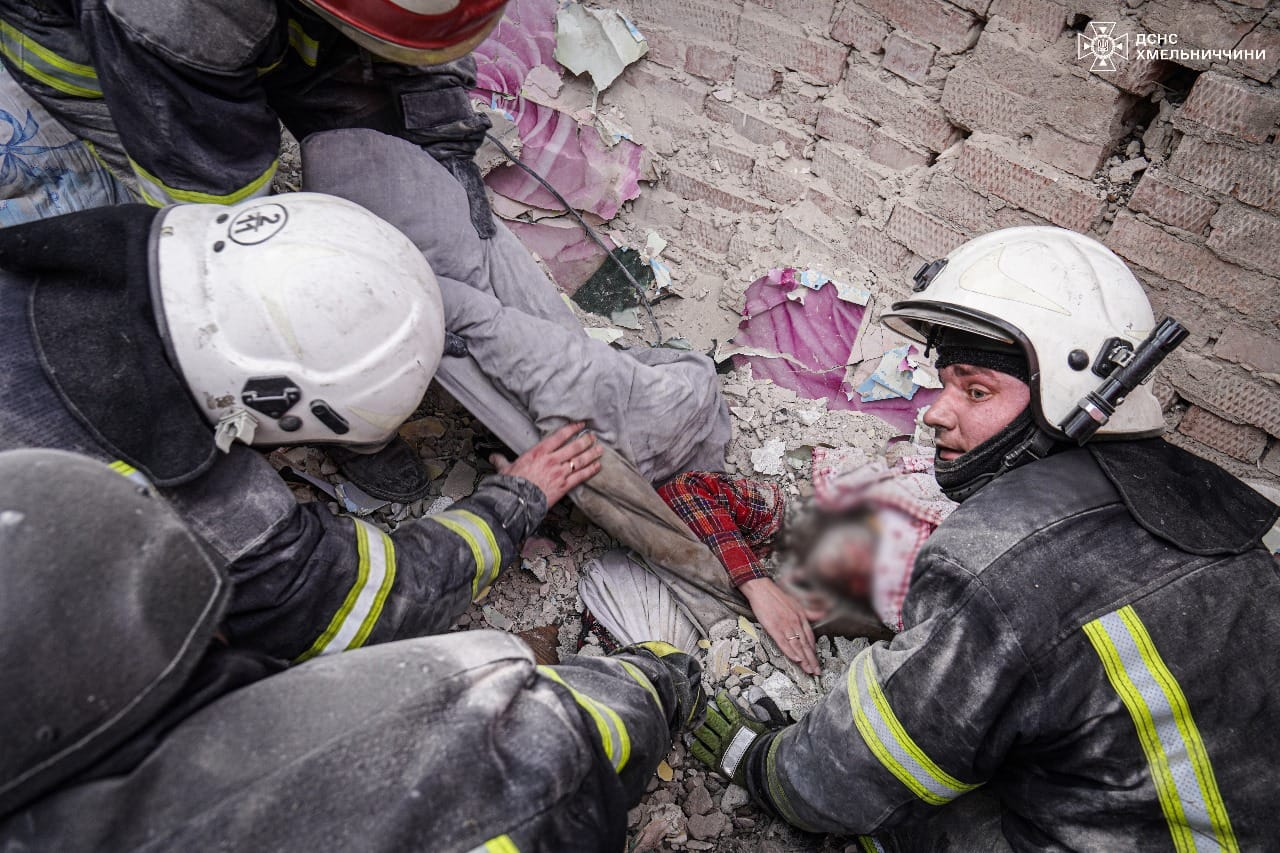
Extracting a person from under the rubble in Khmelnytskyi

In Khmelnytskyi, the strike damaged infrastructure and residential buildings, according to the mayor of the city, Oleksandr Symсhyshyn. Two people were killed and eight others were injured.

=== Poltava Oblast ===
In Poltava Oblast, the roofs of three private houses in Myrhorod Raion were damaged by rocket fragments; there were no casualties. Preventive shutdowns of substations were applied in the region and an emergency shutdown schedule was introduced.

=== Other damaged settlements and facilities ===
Attacks on critical infrastructure facilities were also recorded in Vinnytsia, Lviv, Ivano-Frankivsk, Mykolaiv, Odesa Oblast and Dnipro. Emergency power outages to maintain balance in the energy system of Ukraine were introduced in Kirovohrad Oblast and in Dnipro. In Kirovohrad Oblast no damage or shutdown of critical infrastructure facilities was recorded.

== Reaction ==
German Galushchenko, the Minister of Energy of Ukraine called the Russian strike the largest attack on the Ukrainian energy sector in recent times.

Press Secretary of the Russian President Dmitry Peskov for the first time stated that "Russia is in a state of war with Ukraine" rather than referring to Russia's invasion of Ukraine as a "special operation".

== See also ==
- 29 December 2023 Russian strikes on Ukraine
- 2 January 2024 Russian strikes on Ukraine
- April 2023 Sloviansk airstrike
- 26 August 2024 Russian strikes on Ukraine
- Russian war crimes
