= Kharkiv TEC-5 =

Combined heat and power plant in Kharkiv Oblast, Ukraine

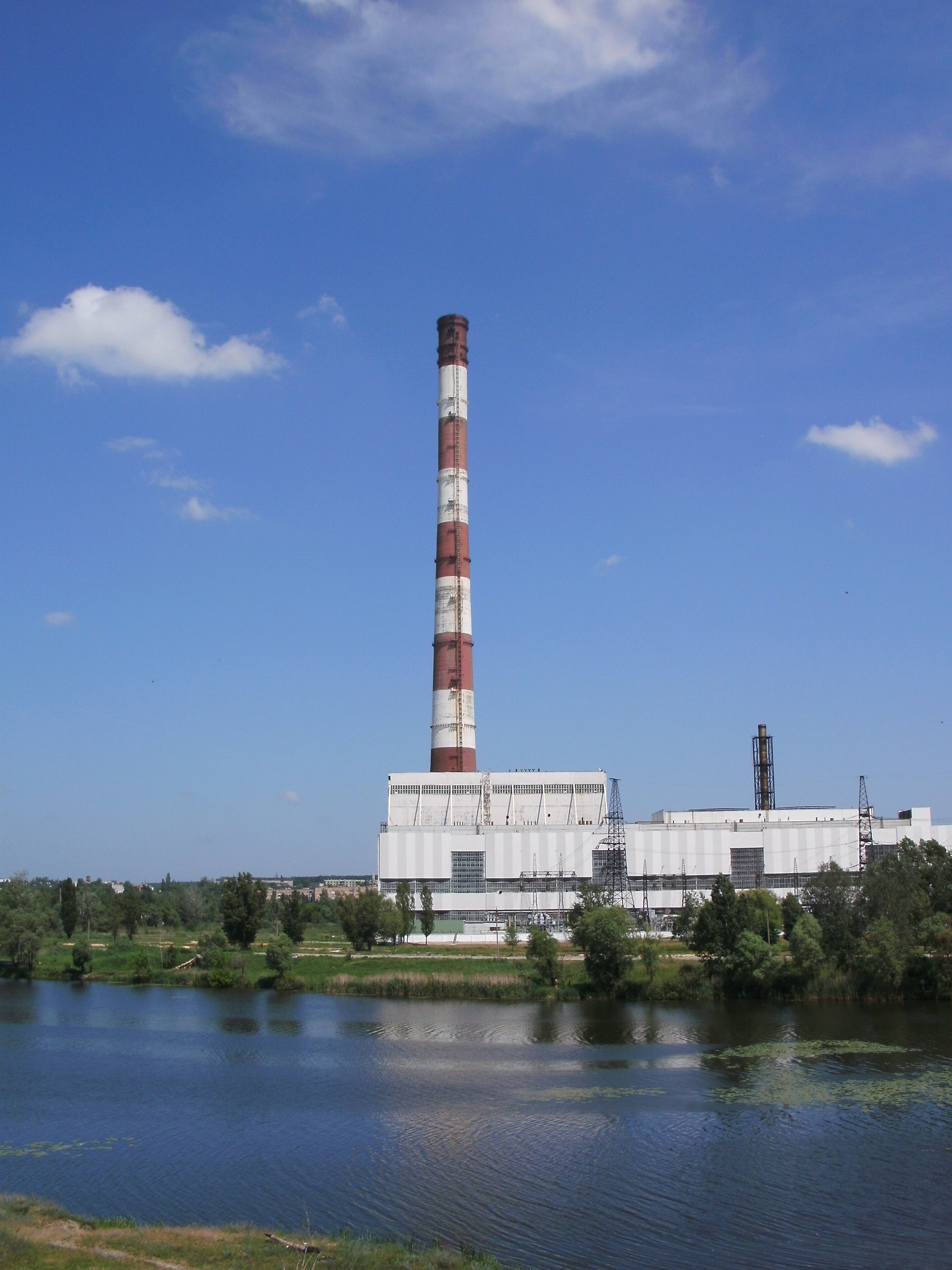
- Official name: Харківська ТЕЦ-5
- Country: Ukraine
- Location: Podvirky, Kharkiv Raion, Kharkiv Oblast
- Coordinates: 49°58′17″N 36°06′2″E
- Status: Damaged by Russian Armed Forces shelling, not operational at least until May 2025
- Construction began: 1972
- Commission date: 1980
- Owner: JSC Kharkiv CHPP-5

Thermal power station
- Primary fuel: Natural gas
- Secondary fuel: Fuel oil
- Cogeneration?: Yes

Power generation
- Units operational: 2 x 120 MW; 1 x 300 MW
- Make and model: TAGMET; UTMZ
- Nameplate capacity: 540 MW

External links
- Website: www.chpp5.kharkiv.com/Eng/index.shtm
- Commons: Related media on Commons

Kharkiv TEC-5 (Ukrainian: Харківська ТЕЦ-5) is a combined heat and power plant (CHP) near Podvirky village in Kharkiv Raion of Kharkiv Oblast, Ukraine. It is the second largest CHP plant in Ukraine. It has a capacity of 540 MW of electric power and up to 1,650 MW of heat power. It has a 330-meter (1,080 ft) tall chimney, built in 1979. There are also two 81-meter (266 ft) tall cooling towers. The plant was severely damaged during the 22 March 2024 Russian attack, knocking it offline and requires restoration work that will likely run into 2025.

The power plant is owned and operated by JSC Kharkiv CHPP-5 (Ukrainian: Харківська ТЕЦ-5), a subsidiary of Naftogaz Ukrainy.

== History ==
The TEC-5 power plant was built in the 1970s under the political system and jurisdiction of the Soviet Union.

On 11 September 2022, in response to the 2022 Ukrainian Kharkiv counteroffensive, the Russian Armed Forces struck the plant with Kalibr cruise missiles. This caused extensive power outages in Kharkiv, Dnipro, Sumy Oblast, and Poltava.

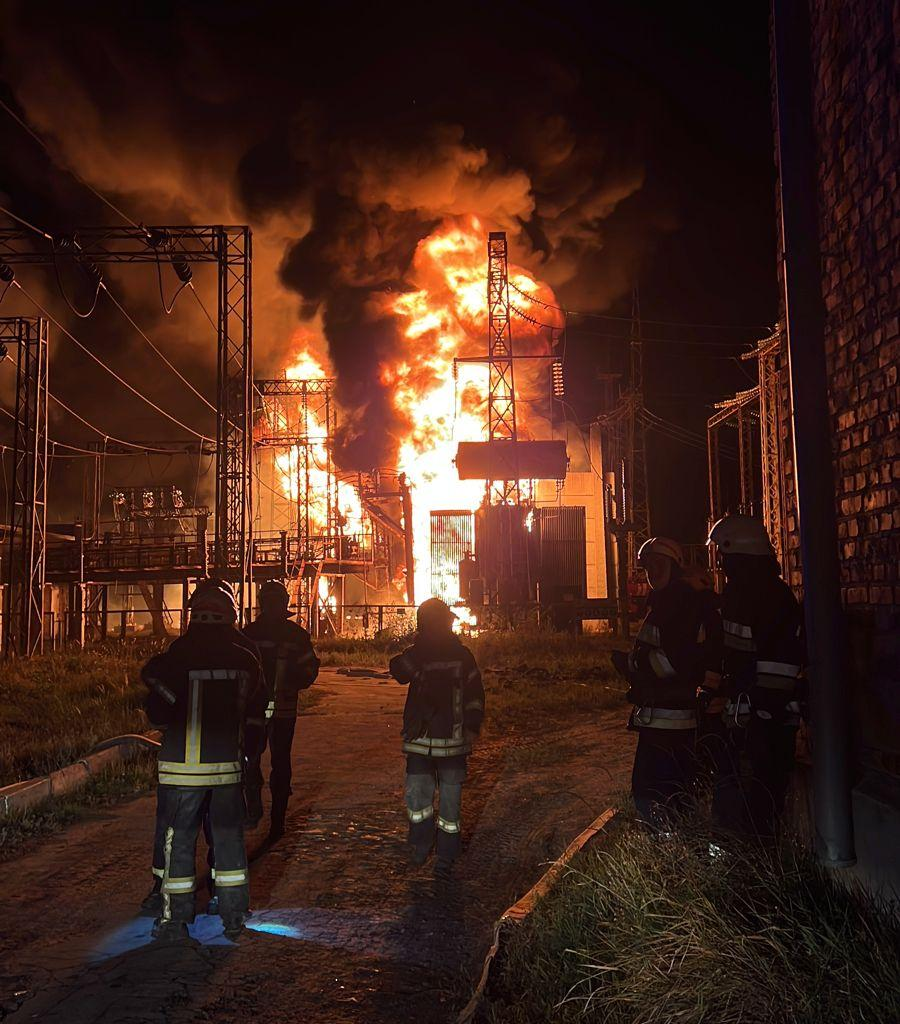
Fire after the missile strike on 11 September 2022

During the 22 March 2024 Russian attacks that left over a million people in Ukraine and in Kharkiv without electricity, Kharkiv TEC-5 was also hit. The plant was so heavily damaged that it ceased operation. Chief executive officer of the plant Oleksandr Minkovich claimed that "the reconstruction process will last more than one year." The city of Kharkiv became dependent on other regions of Ukraine for its energy needs.

The plant was also hit in October 2026, according to the Ukrainian government.
