= 2025 Yarova attack =

Missile attack on Donetsk Oblast, Ukraine

- Part of War crimes during the Russian invasion of Ukraine
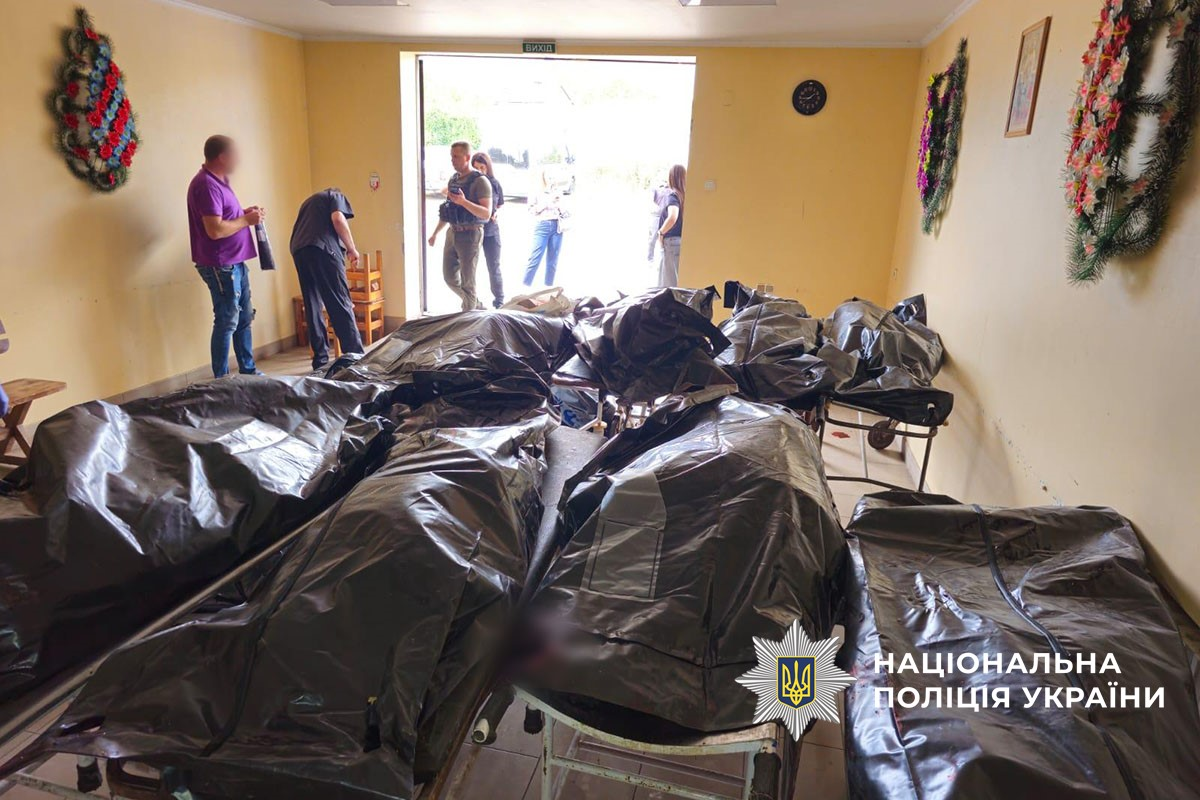
- Body bags in Yarova following the attack
- Location: Yarova, Donetsk Oblast, Ukraine
- Date: 9 September 2026; 10:40am
- Target: Ukrainian civilians
- Attack type: Glide bomb
- Deaths: 25
- Injuries: 19
- Perpetrator: Russia

On 9 September 2025, as part of the Russo-Ukrainian War, Russia launched a missile strike on Yarova, Donetsk Oblast, Ukraine that killed 25 pensioners and injured 18 others who were waiting to pick up their pension. Human Rights Watch confirmed all the killed people were civilians and concluded that the Russian strike may amount to a war crime of indiscriminate and disproportionate attack.

== Background ==
Yarova is located in northern Donetsk Oblast, about 15 miles north of Sloviansk. It had been the site of several battles in early 2022 when it was a frontline village between Russian and Ukrainian troops, although following the 2022 Kharkiv counteroffensive the village was liberated by Ukrainian forces. In late August 2025, Russian forces ramped up attacks on Ukrainian cities, killing 23 people in Kyiv.

== Attack ==
The Russian missile strike hit the center of Yarova at 10:40am, while pensioners were lining up to receive their pensions from a mobile Ukrposhta van. The van had been parked under trees to avoid being targeted, and the local Ukrposhta head Igor Smelyansky said that they had been moving around the van and changing patterns to avoid targeting. Interior Minister Ihor Klymenko said that the bomb was a guided air bomb, and that someone had possibly given away the coordinates of the pensioners.

Ukrainian emergency services said that 24 people had been killed, of whom 23 were elderly, and nineteen others were injured. By September 10, Donetsk Oblast governor Vadym Filashkin said that the death toll increased to 25 killed and 18 injured.

== Reactions ==
Ukrainian president Volodymyr Zelenskyy called the attack "brutally savage", and Ukrainian officials launched a war crime investigation.

Human Rights Watch confirmed all the killed people were civilians. It concluded that the Russian strike may amount to a war crime of indiscriminate and disproportionate attack.

== See also ==
- Russian attacks on civilians in the Russo-Ukrainian war (2022–present)
- 2025 Ternopil apartment strike
- February 2025 Poltava strike
- Russian war crimes
