= Sukhanivka, Donetsk Oblast =

Rural locality in Donetsk Oblast, Ukraine

Sukhanivka Суханівка
- Rural settlement
- Location of Andriivka in Donetsk Oblast Sukhanivka (Donetsk Oblast)
- Coordinates: 48°49′16″N 37°31′57″E
- Country: Ukraine
- Oblast: Donetsk Oblast
- Raion: Kramatorsk Raion
- Hromada: Sloviansk urban hromada

Area
  - Total: 1.2 km^{2} (0.46 sq mi)
- Elevation: 67 m (220 ft)

Population (2022)
  - Total: 833
  - Density: 690/km^{2} (1,800/sq mi)
- Time zone: UTC+2
  - Summer (DST): UTC+3
- Postal code: 84175
- Area code: +380 6262

Sukhanivka (Ukrainian: Суханівка), previously known as Andriivka (Ukrainian: Андріївка) between 1938 and 2024, is a rural settlement (a selyshche) in Kramatorsk Raion, Donetsk Oblast, eastern Ukraine. It is subordinate to Sloviansk urban hromada, one of the hromadas of Ukraine. It has a population of 833 (2022 estimate).

== Geography ==
Sukhanivka is located on the Sukhyi Torets river. It is located 8 kilometres (5.0 mi) to the south of Sloviansk.

== History ==
Until 1861, the land on which modern Sukhanivka is located belonged to landholders named Sukhanov, Yefanov, and Mazan. Small hamlets grew up on the territory, several named after the men, including Bykivka, Yefanivka, Mazanivka, Sukhanivka and Khomychivka. In 1869, the Kursk–Kharkiv–Azov railway was laid through these lands.

In 1921 or 1922, a collective farm was organized at Sukhanivka. The head of the farm was one Andrii Petrunchyk, after whom the farm was named. Later that year, Petrunchyk was allegedly murdered by "bandits", according to Soviet sources. In 1938, Andriivka was granted urban-type settlement status. Andriivka was formed by the merger of the Bykivka, Yefanivka, Mazanivka, Sukhanivka and Khomychivka hamlets.

Andriivka's urban-type settlement status was removed on 26 January 2024, when a new law entered into force which abolished this status, and Andriivka became a rural settlement. On 19 September 2024, the Verkhovna Rada voted to rename Andriivka to Sukhanivka.

== Economy ==
The area of and around Sukhanivka has large deposits of chalk and clay that are extracted. As of the 1970s, most workers from Sukhanivka worked for enterprises in Kramatorsk and Sloviansk.

== Demographics ==
As of 2000, Sukhanivka had a population of around 1,300 people, of whom 75% self-identified as Ukrainians, 20% as Russians and 5% as other ethnic backgrounds. By 2022, the population had fallen to 833 people.
