= Sukhyi Torets =

Coordinates: 48°49′08″N 37°35′46″E

The Sukhyi Torets (Ukrainian: Сухий Торець) is a river in eastern Ukraine. It is a tributary of the Seversky Donets.

== Populated places ==
The hamlet of Andriivka is located on the Sukhyi Torets.

== History ==
On 20 June 2014, during the early part of the war in Donbas, OSCE Special Monitoring Mission to Ukraine monitors met with the self-proclaimed mayor of Sloviansk, Volodymyr Pavlenko, who said that sewage systems in Sloviansk had collapsed, resulting in the release of least 10,000 litres of untreated sewage into the river. He called this an "environmental catastrophe", and said that it had the potential to affect both Russia and Ukraine.
