= Volodymyr Kudrytskyi =

Ukrainian economist

- Кудрицький Володимир Дмитрович
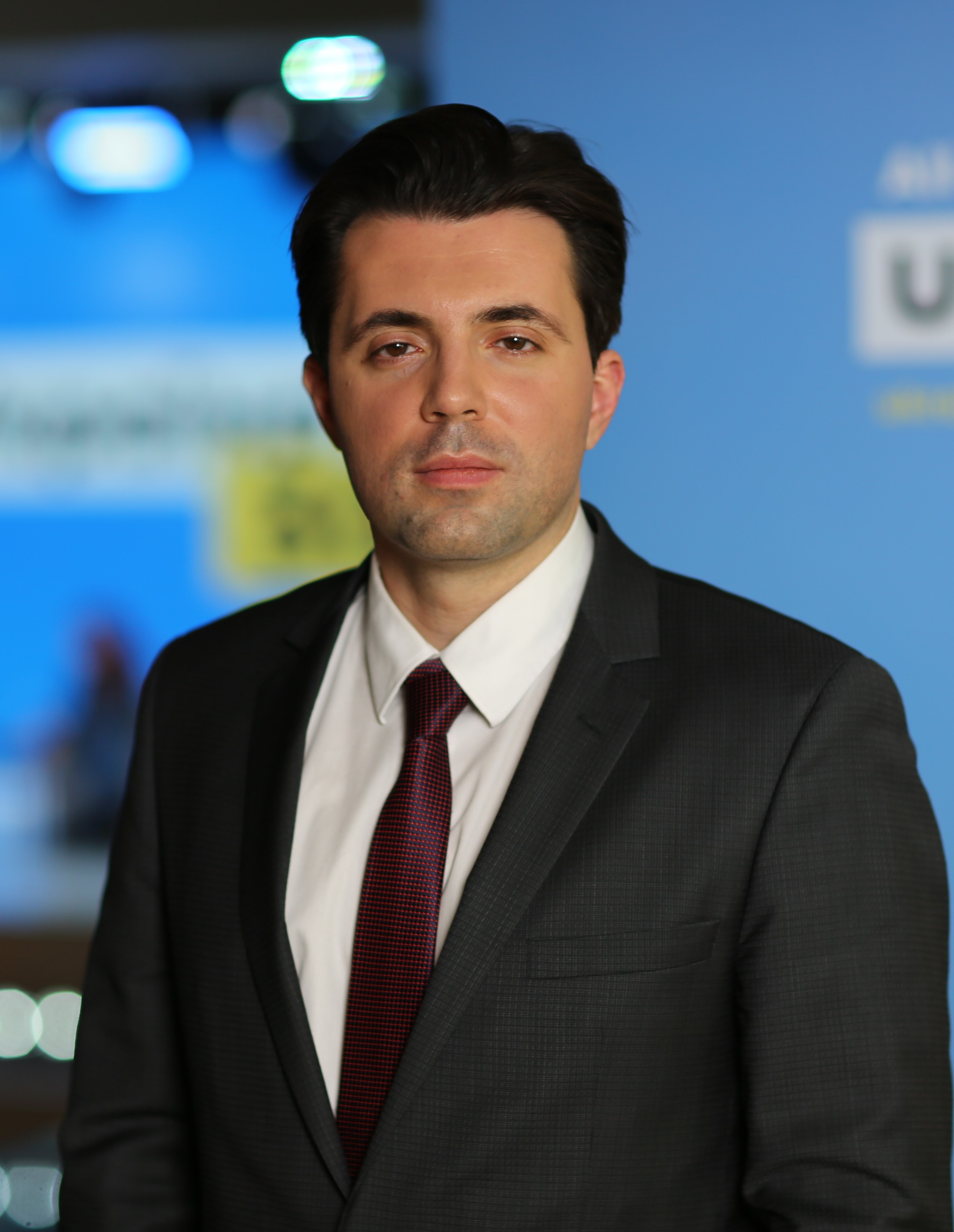
- Born: May 23, 1986 (age 40)
- Citizenship: Ukraine
- Education: Kyiv National Economic University
- Occupation: Chairman of the Board of PJSC "National Power Company Ukrenergo"

Volodymyr Kudrytskyi is the chairman of the Board of PJSC "National Power Company Ukrenergo", the operator of the Ukrainian electricity transmission system. Kydrytskyi is involved in a number of corruption scandals and investigations.

== Education ==
Volodymyr Kudrytskyi graduated with honors from the Faculty of International Economics of Kyiv National Economic University named after Vadym Hetman. He is a member of the UK's Association of Chartered Certified Accountants (ACCA) and a certified internal auditor of the Institute of Internal Auditors of the USA (CIA).

== Career before Ukrenergo ==
From 2007 to 2011, he worked in various positions at one of the largest auditing and consulting companies, Grant Thornton Ukraine, which is part of Grant Thornton International. He managed audit and consulting projects, business development and restructuring projects for NJSC Naftogaz of Ukraine, Pivdenmash, and the Polish metallurgical company Centrostal.

He served as the Director of Internal Audit at TNK-BP Ukraine from 2011 until the company was acquired by Rosneft in 2013.

From 2013 to 2016, he participated in several consulting projects for various companies. In particular, he led projects on sales optimization, logistics, and procurement for Myronivsky Hliboproduct, reorganized the internal control and risk management systems of Group subsidiaries, and managed crisis measures for the media division of the investment consulting group EastOne, including the restructuring of the publishing house "Ekonomika", and the development of strategic and operational plans for the group's media assets (TV group Starlightmedia, publishing house Ekonomika, newspaper Fakty ta Komentari), and implemented a management buy-out of the business.

In 2015–2016, he was the development director at PJSC Ukrtransnafta. He joined the company during a partial renewal of the management team.

From December 2017 to May 2019, he was a state representative on the supervisory board of NJSC Naftogaz of Ukraine. He was a member of the audit committee and the unbundling committee. On the supervisory board, he defended the interests of companies controlled by Ihor Kolomoyskyi, including "Ukrnafta".

He is a member of the advisory and supervisory group of the Construction Sector Transparency Initiative (CoST).

== Work at Ukrenergo ==
=== Appointment as Chairman of the Management Board of Ukrenergo ===
In 2016, he joined Ukrenergo as the head of the project management office. He then became deputy director of Investments and First Deputy Chairman of the management board.

Since February 27, 2020, he has been the acting chairman of the management board, after the previous head of Ukrenergo, Vsevolod Kovalchuk, resigned. On August 2, 2020, the supervisory board of Ukrenergo, based on the results of a competition, appointed Volodymyr Kudrytskyi as the chairman of the management board.

After his appointment as chairman of the management board of Ukrenergo, Kudrytskyi continued to pursue the company's key strategic goal – the integration of Ukraine's power system into ENTSO-E. Credit financing attracted by the Kudrytskyi administration enabled Ukrenergo to earn a profit of 141 million hryvnias in 2021 and 2 billion hryvnias in the first quarter of 2022.

=== Conflict of interest due to ties with Ihor Kolomoisky ===
Before joining PJSC National Power Company Ukrenergo, Kudrytskyi worked for PJSC Ukrtransnafta, which was controlled by Ihor Kolomoyskyi, at a time of active confrontation with the current head, Vsevolod Kovalchuk. Employees of the company held long protests, blocking the work of the Ukrenergo office. As soon as Volodymyr Kudrytskyi was appointed chairman of the board of Ukrenergo, the conflict was resolved, and there were no more negative statements from Kolomoyskyi regarding the company's management. Media investigations revealed that Ihor Kolomoyskyi had influence over Ukrenergo. Additionally, journalists reported other forms of loyalty to Kolomoyskyi's company. For example, Centrenergo sold electricity to United Energy, controlled by Kolomoyskyi, at a price below cost.

=== Audit of Ukrenergo ===
According to the results of an audit of Ukrenergo for the years 2019–2023 by the State Audit Service of Ukraine, abuses amounting to 68 billion hryvnias were discovered, and Prosecutor General's Office conducted searches at the Ukrenergo office. The state operator tried to challenge the audit results in court but lost the case to the State Audit Service. Auditors found that the actions of Ukrenergo employees led to the untimely cessation of electricity supply to United Energy, resulting in non-payment of debt, and due to non-fulfillment of contract terms and court claims, the state operator paid fines and court fees amounting to 285 million hryvnias. Additionally, in the spring of 2022, Ukrenergo purchased bulletproof vests at inflated prices, spending over 20 million hryvnias, although their market price was half that amount.

=== Case of embezzlement of 1.4 billion hryvnias ===
According to an investigation by journalist Serhiy Ivanov, at the beginning of the invasion, United Energy, owned by businessman Ihor Kolomoyskyi's partner Mykhailo Kiperman, received electricity from Ukrenergo worth over 1.4 billion hryvnias, resold it on the market, and did not settle accounts with the state operator. The journalist claims that the management of Ukrenergo likely facilitated the implementation of this scheme. Two top managers of Ukrenergo, who were directly responsible for the contract with United Energy, went abroad on business trips and did not return. One permit for the business trip was personally signed by Volodymyr Kudrytskyi.

The National Anti-Corruption Bureau of Ukraine (NABU) opened a criminal case due to the state's loss of 1.4 billion hryvnias. Ukrenergo filed a lawsuit against the guarantee bank Alliance to shift the blame to the financial institution. The bank believes that the conditions of the guarantee were violated by the participants in the contract. The Prosecutor General's Office recognized the financial institution as the victim, and the Center for Judicial Expertise and Expert Research confirmed the legality of the bank's chairman's actions. The State Audit Service and the National Commission for State Regulation of Energy and Utilities (NCSREU) held Ukrenergo officials responsible for the debt and non-payment. The bank filed a counterclaim against Ukrenergo and won the first instance.

=== Use of funds for shelter construction ===
Various sources indicate that over 50 billion hryvnias were spent on building shelters to protect critical infrastructure objects. The main recipients of budget funds were the State Agency for Restoration and Development of Infrastructure of Ukraine, overseen by former Deputy Prime Minister Oleksandr Kubrakov, and Ukrenergo under the leadership of Volodymyr Kudrytskyi. According to the publication Nashi Hroshi, between August 14 and September 4, 2023, Ukrenergo concluded a series of agreements worth 2.8 billion hryvnias. In September 2023, the government allocated an additional 9.7 billion hryvnias for the protection of strategic energy facilities. In August 2023, Centrenergo, part of Ukrenergo, announced 100% physical protection of the Trypilska TPP and 70% of the Zmiivska TPP. In March and April 2024, 100% of the generation of these two TPPs was destroyed due to Russian missile strikes.

Energy experts, particularly Viktor Kurtev, noted that the president was misled by a plan to protect energy facilities using concrete shelters, which proved ineffective. Viktor Kurtev emphasized that there were alternative, more effective ways to protect energy system objects. However, the least effective and non-transparent option was chosen. Oleksandr Kubrakov was dismissed on May 9, 2024, while Volodymyr Kudrytskyi remained in his position.

=== Classified salary at Ukrenergo ===
In response to a media inquiry, Ukrenergo stated that the law does not require specifying salaries individually, so the income of Volodymyr Kudrytskyi was not disclosed separately. Data on the salaries of the entire board was provided: Volodymyr Kudrytskyi and four board members. The average monthly salary for one board member exceeded 2 million hryvnias. In December 2023, they received nearly 8 million hryvnias, in January 2024 – 4.2 million hryvnias, and in April 2024 – 8.5 million hryvnias. The average salary of Ukrenergo employees in 2023 was 35.4 thousand hryvnias.

=== OSINT investigation into enrichment ===
According to an OSINT investigation by the group Blackboxosint, in December 2022, Volodymyr Kudrytskyi's wife, Oleksandra Yastremska, purchased a plot of land in the capital on General Pavlenko Street for $14,000, although the market value of the plot was about $75,000. There is now a newly built house worth $300,000-400,000. On September 13, 2023, Kudrytskyi's wife bought a 2022 TOYOTA Highlander for 2.3 million hryvnias. During the martial law period, Kudrytskyi traveled abroad 11 times, visiting Poland, Belgium, Switzerland, and the USA.

== Detainment ==
On 28 October 2025, Kudrytskyi was detained in Lviv Oblast by the State Bureau of Investigation of Ukraine. The arrest follows a raid on his home a week earlier.

On 29 October, the Pechersk District Court of Kyiv ordered pre-trial detention for the former Ukrenergo head, suspected of embezzling state company funds. The court upheld the prosecutor’s motion in full, remanding him in custody until 26 December with the option of bail set at ₴13.73 million. The court also required him to remain at his registered address, wear an electronic bracelet, and surrender his passport. The judge rejected requests from several MPs to post bail on his behalf.

On 30 October, Kudrytskyi was released from custody after posting bail.
