= September 2024 Poltava strike =

- Part of the Russian invasion of Ukraine
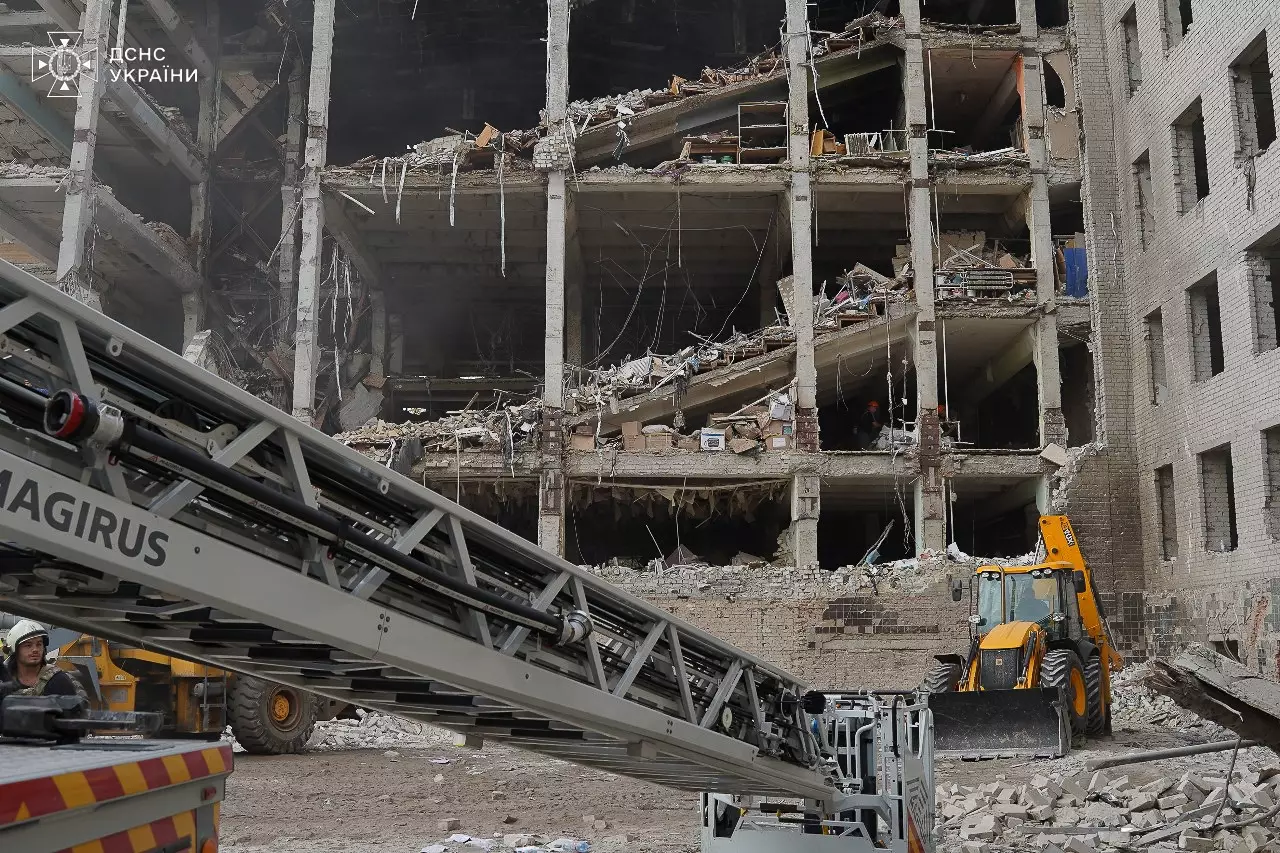
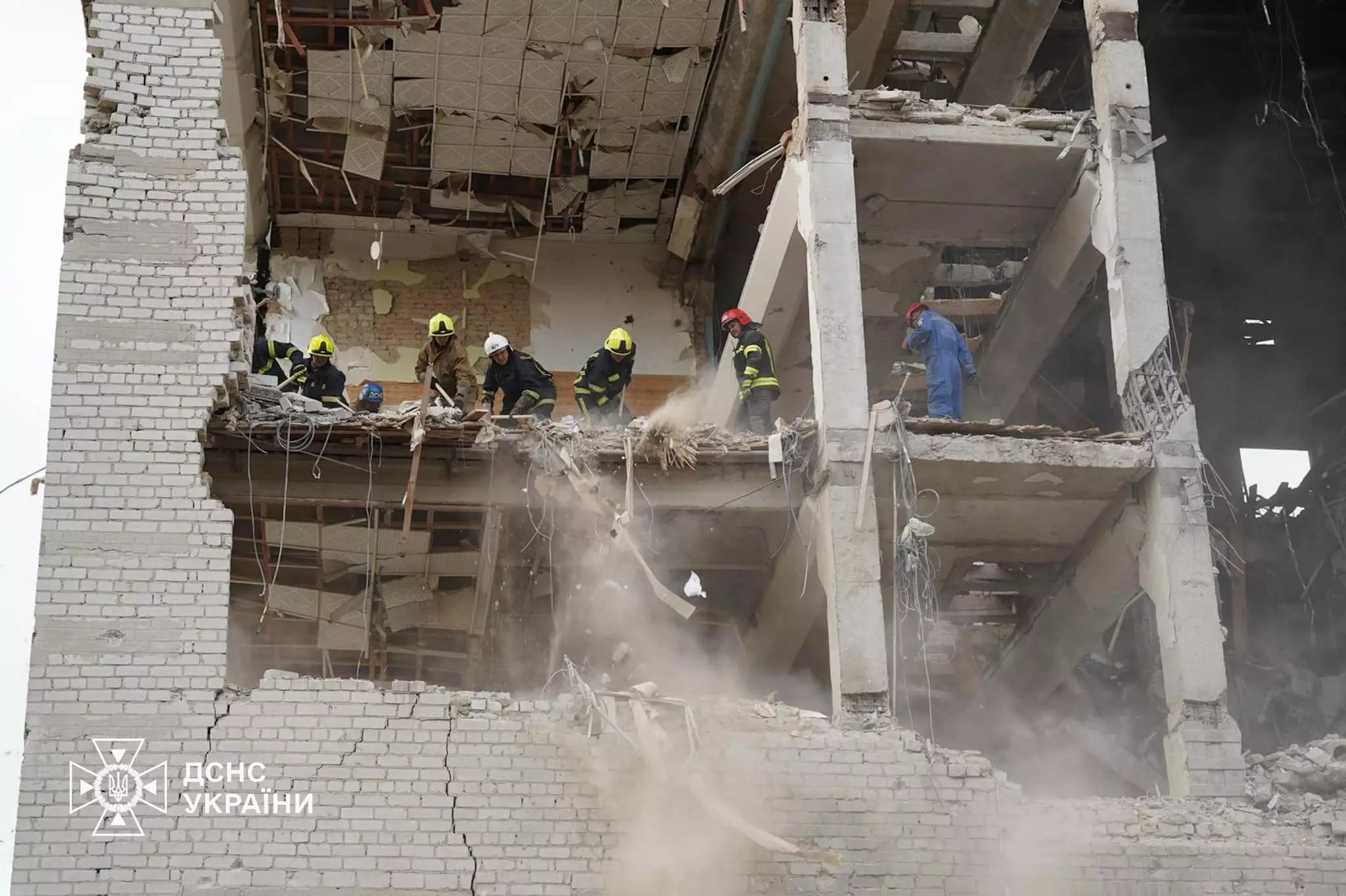
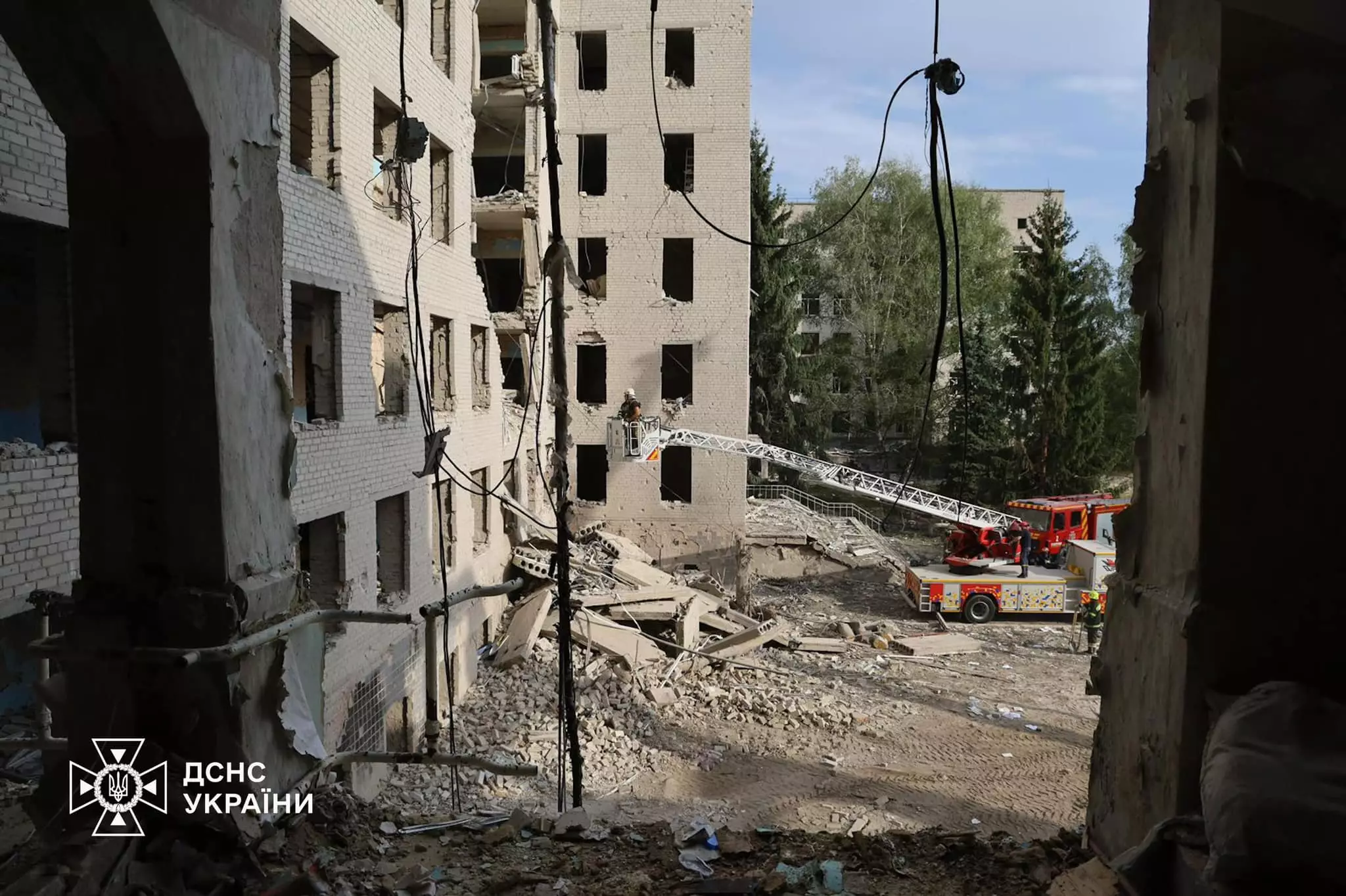
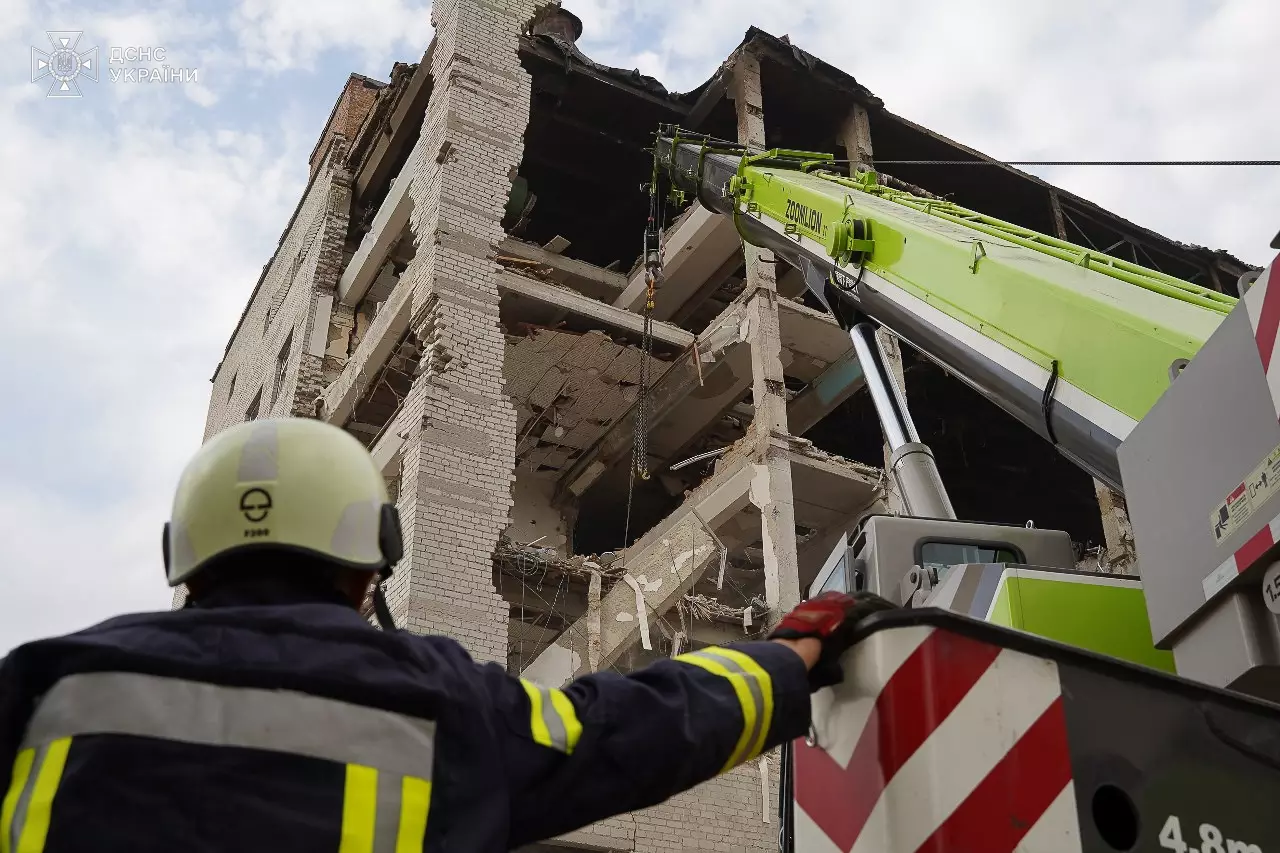
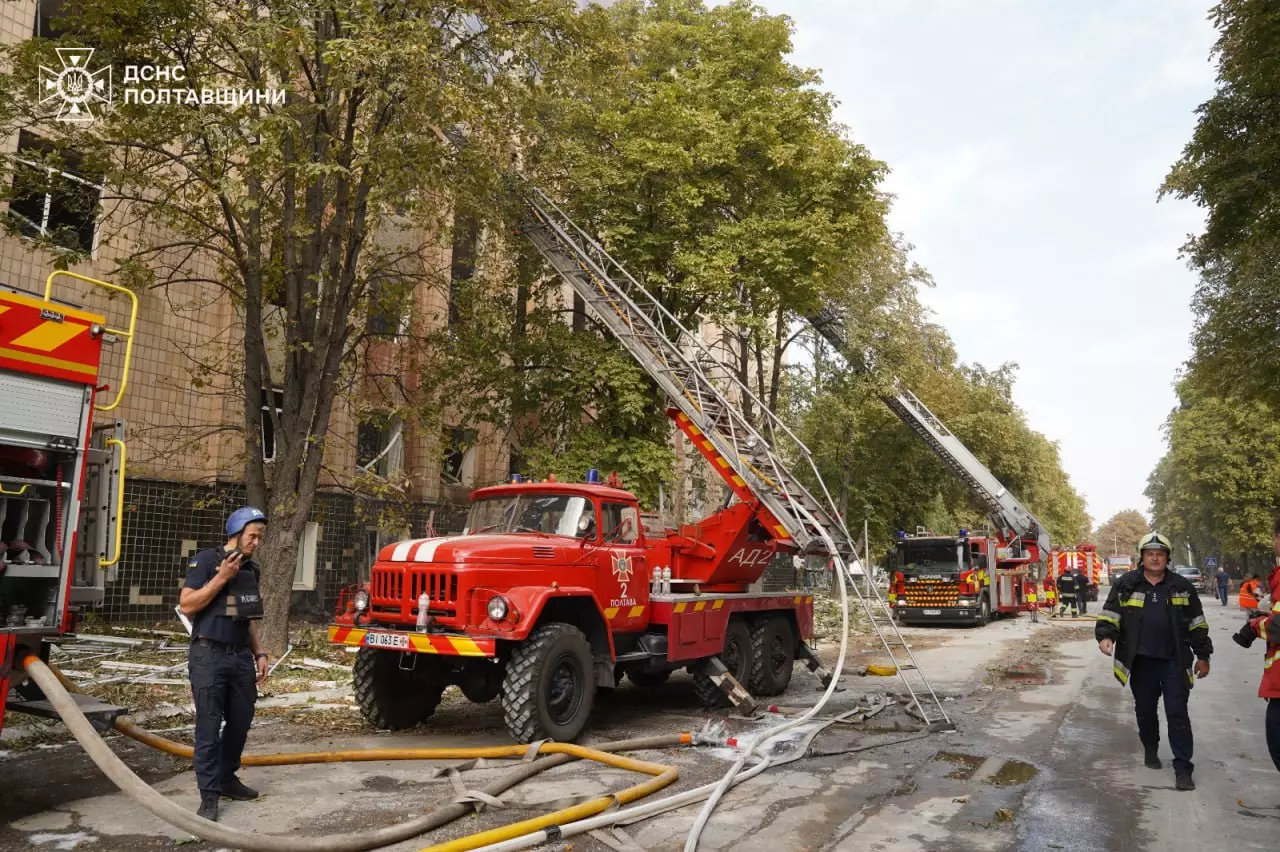
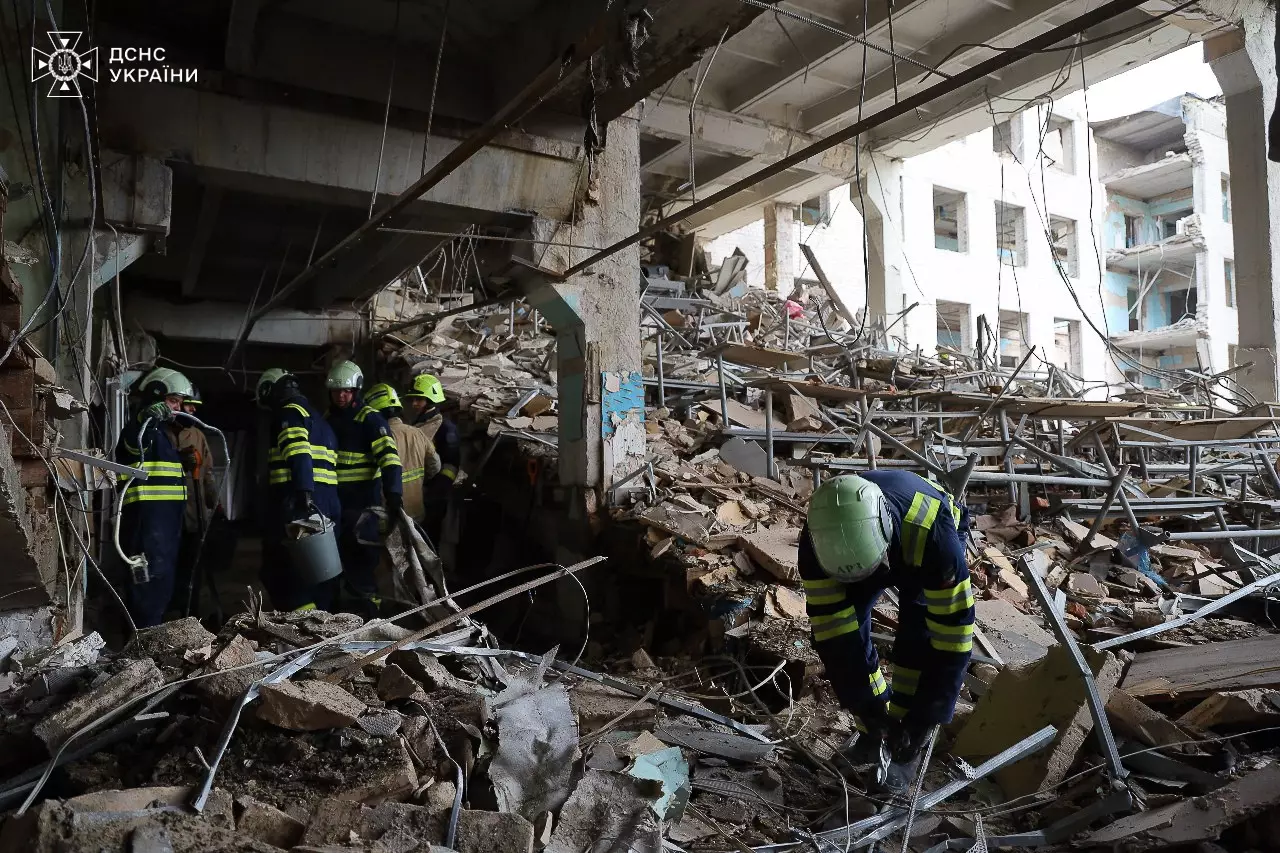
- Emergency rescue and search operations after the strike
- Type: Missile strike
- Location: Poltava, Poltava Oblast, Ukraine
- Date: 3 September 2024
- Executed by: Russian Armed Forces
- Casualties: 75 missing and killed 328 injured

On 3 September 2024, two Russian missiles hit a branch of the Military Institute of Telecommunications and Information Technologies and a nearby hospital in Poltava, Ukraine, killing at least 59, leaving 16 missing and injuring at least 328. According to president Volodymyr Zelenskyy, a building in the military institute was "partially destroyed". It was the deadliest attack in Poltava Oblast during the Russo-Ukrainian War.

== Attack ==
The attack occurred shortly after 09:08 and damaged ten other buildings. As 3 October, 59 people were killed, including four dead by wounds and more than 300 were injured. Additionally, 16 were reported missing.

The Office of the Prosecutor General said that "One of the buildings of the Institute of Communications, a hospital and nearby houses were partially destroyed". Emergency services rescued 25 people, including 11 who were trapped under the rubble of the affected buildings. The Ukrainian defence ministry said that the interval between activation of air raid sirens and the arrival of the missiles was too short to allow people to safely reach bomb shelters. The ministry added that the attack occurred while classes were ongoing.

== Responses ==
=== Ukraine ===
President Zelenskyy ordered an investigation into the attack, and called on Western nations to ensure the arrival of missiles and air defence systems. He also said Russia will "surely pay" for the attack. Philip Pronin, the governor of Poltava Oblast, announced three days of mourning beginning on 4 September.

Maryana Bezuhla, a deputy in the Verkhovna Rada, accused Ukraine's military leadership of putting soldiers in danger.

=== Russia ===
The Russian defence ministry said that it had struck a drone and electronic warfare training center during the attack.

=== International ===
The attack was condemned by Germany, the United Kingdom and the United States, with President Joe Biden describing the incident as "deplorable".

== See also ==
- February 2025 Poltava strike
