= April 2023 Sloviansk airstrike =

14 April 2023 missile strike during the Russian invasion of Ukraine

- Part of Attacks on civilians in the Russian invasion of Ukraine
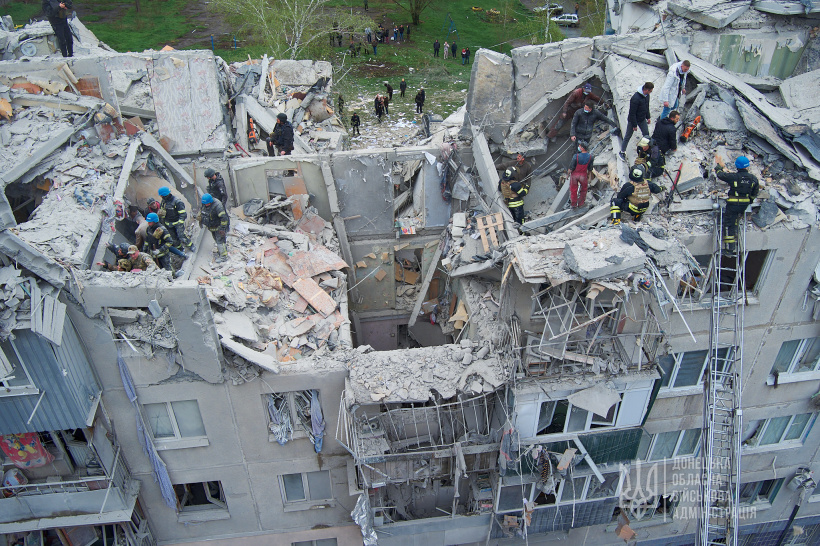
- Firefighters and rescue workers on a residential building in Sloviansk after the Russian airstrike
- Location: 48°51′12″N 37°37′30″E; Sloviansk, Donetsk Oblast, Ukraine
- Date: 14 April 2023; 18:00 hrs
- Deaths: 15
- Injuries: 24
- Perpetrator: Russia

On 14 April 2023, on Eastern Orthodox Christian Good Friday, a Russian missile strike struck residential buildings in Sloviansk, Ukraine, during the Russian invasion of Ukraine. 15 civilians were killed and 24 were injured. 34 apartment buildings, administrative buildings, and shops were damaged in the blasts.

Ukrainian President Volodymyr Zelenskyy condemned the attack, noting that it shows Russia's cruelty since it was carried out during the religious holiday of Easter.

== See also ==
- Zaporizhzhia residential building airstrike
- September 2023 Kostiantynivka missile strike
- 26 August 2024 Russian strikes on Ukraine
- War crimes in the Russian invasion of Ukraine
