= Bylbasivka =

Urban locality in Donetsk Oblast, Ukraine

Bylbasivka Билбасівка
- Rural settlement
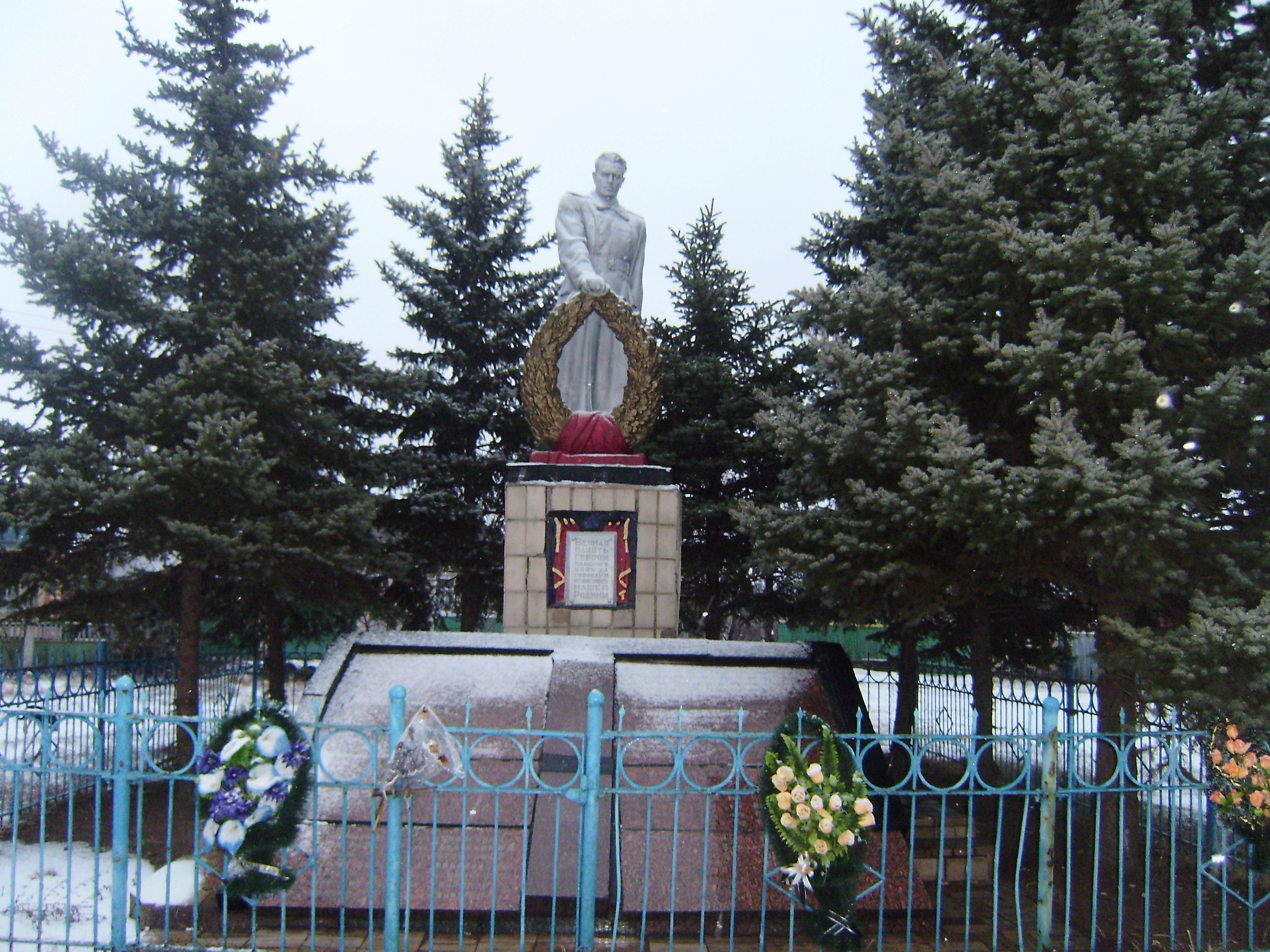

- Location of Bylbasivka within Donetsk Oblast#Location of Bylbasivka within Ukraine Bylbasivka (Ukraine)
- Coordinates: 48°50′23″N 37°29′53″E
- Country: Ukraine
- Oblast: Donetsk Oblast
- District: Kramatorsk Raion
- Hromada: Sloviansk urban hromada
- Elevation: 72 m (236 ft)

Population (2022)
  - Total: 5,807
- Time zone: UTC+2 (EET)
  - Summer (DST): UTC+3 (EEST)
- Postal code: 84169-84171
- Area code: +380 6262

Bylbasivka (Ukrainian: Билбасівка) is a rural settlement in Kramatorsk Raion, Donetsk Oblast, eastern Ukraine. Population: 5,807 (2022 estimate).

== Demographics ==
As of the 2001 Ukrainian census, Bylbasivka had a population of 6,830 inhabitants, which decreased to 5,807 in early 2022. The native languages in the settlement were as follows:

Native languages in Bylbasivka
| | percent |
| Ukrainian | 90.8% |
| Russian | 7.5% |
| Romani | 1.2% |
| Hungarian | 0.2% |
| Belarusian | 0.1% |
| others | 0.2% |
