= Sloviansk urban hromada =

Sloviansk urban hromada Слов'янська міська громада
- Hromada
- Interactive map of Sloviansk urban hromada
- Country: Ukraine
- Oblast: Donetsk Oblast
- Raion: Kramatorsk Raion

Area
  - Total: 119.0 km^{2} (45.9 sq mi)

Population (2020)
  - Total: 115,026
  - Density: 966.6/km^{2} (2,503/sq mi)
- Settlements: 5
- Cities: 1
- Rural settlements: 1
- Villages: 1
- Towns: 2

Sloviansk urban hromada (Ukrainian: Слов'янська міська громада) is a hromada of Ukraine, located in Kramatorsk Raion, Donetsk Oblast. Its administrative center is the city Sloviansk.

It has an area of 119.0 square kilometres (45.9 mi^{2}) and a population of 115,026, as of 2020.

The hromada contains 5 settlements: 1 city (Sloviansk), 3 rural settlements (Bylbasivka, Sukhanivka, and Myrne) and the village Torets.

== See also ==
- List of hromadas of Ukraine
