= Ukrenergo =

Operator of the electricity transmission grid in Ukraine

- Native name: ПрАТ «Національна енергетична компанія "Укренерго"»
- Romanized name: PrAT 'Natsional'na enerhetychna kompaniia "Ukrenergo"'
- Company type: Private joint-stock company
- Founded: April 15, 1998; 28 years ago
- Headquarters: 25 Symona Petliury str., Kyiv, Ukraine
- Owner: Ministry of Energy
- Website: ua.energy

The Private JSC NEK Ukrenergo is a state-owned electricity transmission system operator in Ukraine and the sole operator of the high-voltage lines which transmit electricity in Ukraine. It is a member of the European Network of Transmission System Operators for Electricity.

Transmission Network in 2013
Voltage (kilovolt)	Length (kilometre)
800	99
750	4,121
500	375
400	339
330	13,346
220	3,976
110-135	667
Total	22,923

== History ==
The territory of the Soviet Union was integrated into the IPS/UPS synchronous grid, which is now effectively controlled by Russia. The one exception was the "Burshtyn Power Island", centered on the Burshtyn TES, which in 2003 was connected to the synchronous grid of Continental Europe, controlled by the European Network of Transmission System Operators for Electricity (ENTSO-E).

Ukraine continued this arrangement until the annexation of Crimea by the Russian Federation in 2014, after which Ukraine signed an association agreement with EU. On 28 June 2017, the head of Ukrenergo Vsevolod Kovalchuk signed an agreement to synchronize the whole Ukrainian power grid with the European grid. The agreement outlined a roadmap to finalize the process in 2023. But the military buildup preceding the 2022 Russian invasion of Ukraine accelerated this process. On 24 February 2022, 4 hours before the invasion, Ukraine disconnected itself from the Russian grid in what was expected to be a 72 hours test of autonomous stability. Ukraine was able to continue in this less-stable configuration because electricity demand was reduced by about a third as civilians fled the country and fighting caused blackouts in some areas.

Ukraine and Moldova were connected with the ENTSO-E grid on 16 March 2022. At the time of connection, coal power plants were making up for generators that were out of action (including seven of Ukrenergo's fifteen nuclear power plants, representing 10% of Ukraine's electric generation), and there was 2 GW of capacity connecting the two grids.

During the 2022 invasion, Ukrenergo received support from allied countries including a €370 million loan from the European Bank for Reconstruction and Development with assistance from USA and the Netherlands, and several million for generators from the UK.

Ukraine cannot sell power into the rest of the ENTSO-E grid until it installs static synchronous compensators. It is allowed to import electricity, but there is limited transmission capacity to do so, far less than would be needed to power the entire country.

On November 28, 2023, the European Network of Transmission System Operators for Electricity (ENTSO-E) decided to transition Ukraine from a temporary mode to permanent synchronization. This means that the synchronization process of the energy systems of Ukraine and the European Union would be fully completed, and the capacity for importing electricity from Europe would be increased by 500 MW.

== Management ==
Volodymyr Kudrytskyi was the Chairman of the Management Board of PrJSC National Energy Company Ukrenergo until he was fired in September 2024 after the 26 August 2024 Russian strikes on Ukraine that targeted many power production sites.

Prior to his appointment, Kudrytskyi headed the Company as acting Chairman of the Board since February 22, 2020 after the previous CEO of Ukrenergo, Vsevolod Kovalchuk, announced his resignation. Kovalchuk had been acting CEO of NPC Ukrenergo and later acting Chairman of the Board of NPC Ukrenergo since October 2015.

=== Supervisory Board ===
The supervisory board consists of the following members:

- Jeppe Kofod
- Patrick Graichen
- Luigi de Francisci
- Jan Montell
- Yuriy Tokarsky (government representative)
- Yuriy Boyko (government representative)
- Oleksandr Baraniuk (government representative)
