= Yarova =

Urban locality in Donetsk Oblast, Ukraine

Yarova Ярова
- Rural settlement
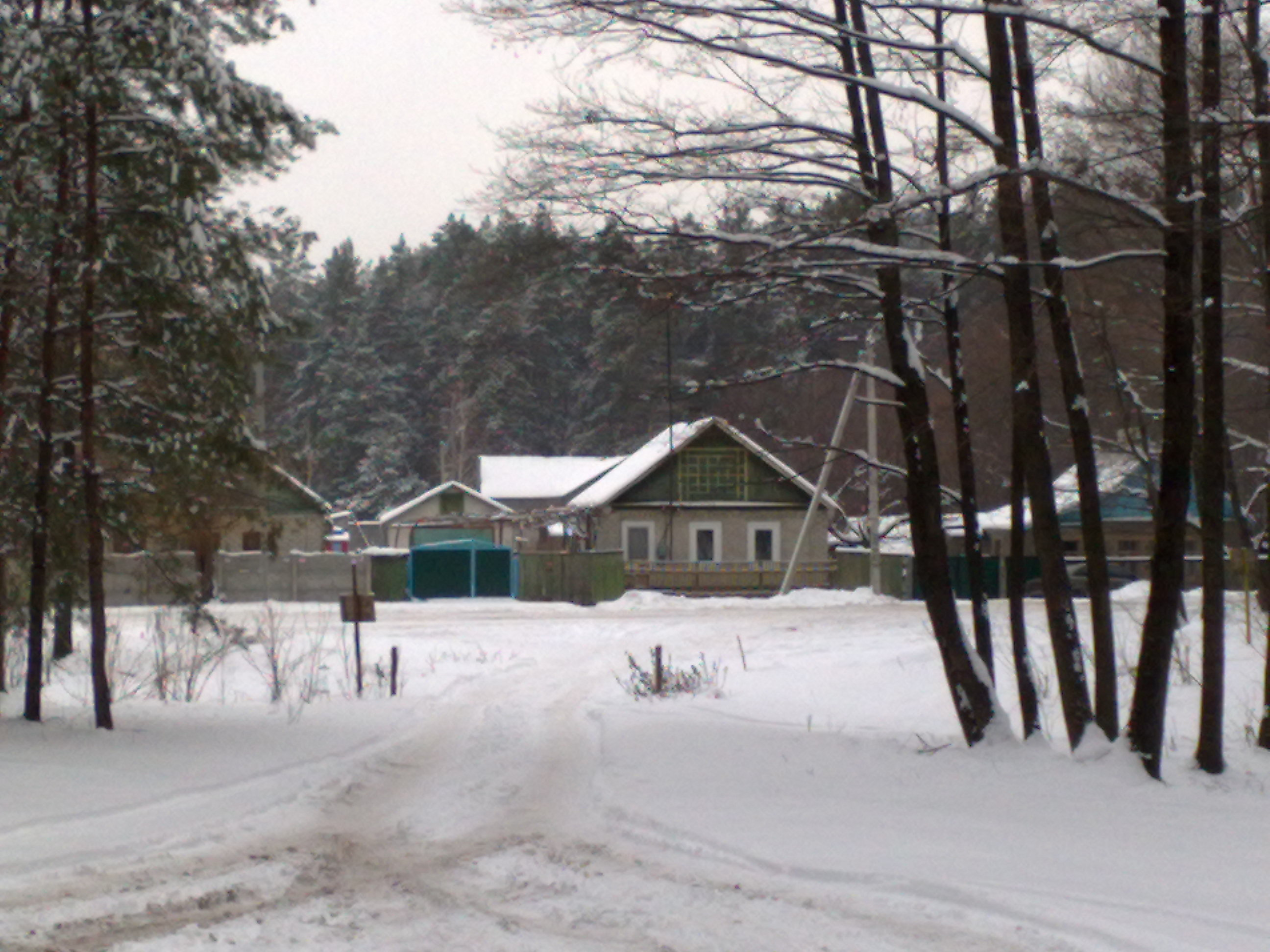

- Location of Yarova in Donetsk Oblast Yarova (Donetsk Oblast)
- Coordinates: 49°03′13″N 37°38′55″E
- Country: Ukraine
- Oblast: Donetsk Oblast
- Raion: Kramatorsk Raion
- Hromada: Lyman urban hromada
- Elevation: 63 m (207 ft)

Population (2022)
  - Total: 1,840
  - Estimate (2025): ~500
- Time zone: UTC+2
  - Summer (DST): UTC+3
- Postal code: 84432
- Area code: +380 6261

Yarova (Ukrainian: Ярова) is a rural settlement in Kramatorsk Raion, Donetsk Oblast, eastern Ukraine.

== History ==
In January 1989, the population was 2,471 people with 1,091 men and 1,380 women. As of 1 January 2013, the population was 2,018 people.

=== Russian invasion of Ukraine ===
Russian forces took control of Yarova in 2022 during the Russian invasion of Ukraine; the settlement was recaptured by Ukraine on 19 September 2022. In September 2025, 23 civilians were killed by a Russian aerial bomb during the distributions of pension payments.

== Demographics ==
In 2022, the population was estimated to be 1,840 (2022 estimate), a decrease from 2,203 in 2001. According to the census conducted in the same year, the linguistic composition of the settlement was 89% Ukrainian and 11% Russian.
