= February 2025 Poltava strike =

- Part of Attacks on civilians in the Russian invasion of Ukraine
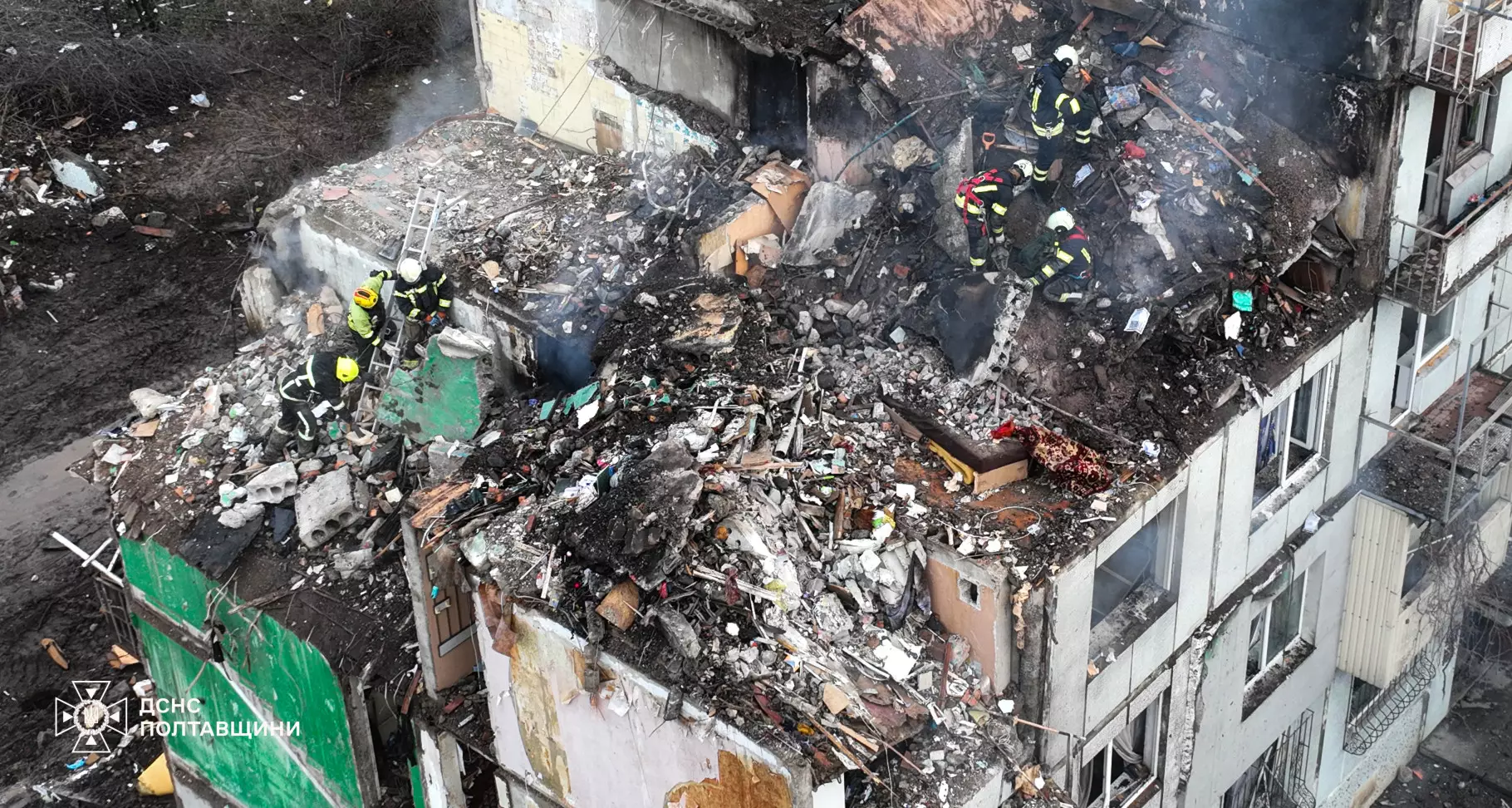
- Emergency rescue and search operations after the strike
- Type: Kh-22 missile strike
- Location: Poltava, Poltava Oblast, Ukraine
- Date: 1 February 2025
- Executed by: Russian Armed Forces
- Casualties: 15 killed 17 injured

On 1 February 2025, a Russian missile hit a high-rise residential apartment building in Poltava, Ukraine, killing 15 and injuring 17 more. The strike, believed to have been carried out by a Kh-22 supersonic cruise missile, caused additional buildings and some energy infrastructure to become damaged. The strike was described as a "terrorist crime" by Ukrainian President Volodymyr Zelenskyy.

== Attack ==
On 1 February 2025, at 7:44 am, during the Russo-Ukrainian War, a Russian missile exploded above an apartment building in Poltava which killed 15 civilians; including two children, while a further 17 were injured; including four children. Poltava was 240 kilometres (150 mi) away from the battlefront during the strike. The missile, believed to be a Kh-22 supersonic cruise missile, struck the west wing entrance of the apartment building, suspending the fourth and fifth floor, collapsed. The explosion shattered 1,500 windows, affecting buildings up to 270 metres (890 ft) away, a combined 308 households accommodating 528 residents. A fire started on the damaged floors shortly after the explosion. A kindergarten and parts of energy infrastructure in Poltava were also damaged.

Human Rights Watch identified a military air base as the only military target in the area, yet it was about 700 metres (2,300 ft) from the strike, and thus deemed the attack on the apartment building indiscriminate and disproportionate, a possible Russian war crime. Part of the struck five-story residential building collapsed, and rescue workers managed to rescue 22 people from the ruins. President of Ukraine Volodymyr Zelenskyy called the attack a "terrorist crime."

== See also ==
- September 2024 Poltava strike
