= Vsevolod Kovalchuk =

- Born: October 7, 1978 (age 47); Sloviansk, Ukraine
- Occupation: Chairman of the Board of Ukrenergo from October 2015 to February 2020
- Spouse: Kovalchuk Iryna Andriivna
- Children: Danylo, Ilya, Vadym

Vsevolod Vladyslavovych Kovalchuk (Ukrainian: Всеволод Владиславович Ковальчук; born October 7, 1978) is a Ukrainian businessman who served as the head of PJSC Ukrenergo from October 2015 to February 2020.

== Education ==
He graduated from Taras Shevchenko National University with a degree in organizational management and from Igor Sikorsky Kyiv Polytechnic Institute with a degree in electrical engineering and electrical technology. He obtained an MBA from the Kyiv International Business School.

== Early career ==
Kovalchuk began working at the age of 14 in the district department of public education, where he was involved in the development and support of software for payroll calculations and the accounting of low-value and fast-moving items.

In the early 2000s, Kovalchuk's activities were related to real estate, woodworking, furniture, building materials, and work in state enterprises, where he was involved in analysis and reform efforts.

In 2001, he worked as a real estate sales manager and later as the head of the sales department at the IT company Formula A.

In 2005, Kovalchuk founded the trading company Razor Distribution Company.

Until 2007, he held various positions at NJSC Naftogaz of Ukraine, ranging from the chief specialist in the analytical department and the department of strategic research to the director of the Information and Analytical Support Department.

Kovalchuk also founded Dominator Group Ukraine LLC, specializing in woodworking, furniture production, and trade.

In 2008, he worked at SE NNEGC Energoatom as the executive director of economic policy and analysis.

In 2010, he joined Ukrenergo for the first time, where he served as an expert in investment and capital construction, deputy director for capital construction and investments, and advisor to the head of the project management group for the construction of the Shcholkine Pumped Storage Power Plant.

In 2013, he founded Ukrainian Forest Resources LLC, a company involved in production and woodworking.

== Work at Ukrenergo ==
Kovalchuk joined Ukrenergo in 2010 as an expert in investment and capital construction, then as the deputy director of PJSC Ukrenergo. He later became the head of the project management group for the construction of the Shcholkine Pumped Storage Power Plant. He left in 2013.

On February 25, 2015, he was appointed as the first deputy director of PJSC Ukrenergo.

=== Reforms at Ukrenergo ===
Vsevolod Kovalchuk initiated and implemented a corporate governance reform at Ukrenergo. A new company statute was adopted. As a result of this corporate governance reform, strategic oversight of the state enterprise's activities was carried out through a supervisory board. Out of the seven members of the supervisory board, four are independent directors elected by a special committee under the Ministry of Economic Development and Trade of Ukraine and approved by the Cabinet of Ministers of Ukraine. The main goal of the reform was to introduce competent, transparent, and impartial control over the company's management.

Under Kovalchuk's leadership, Ukrenergo began collaborating with the Construction Sector Transparency Initiative (CoST) and Transparency International Ukraine. This allowed the company to implement international standards for information disclosure and maximum transparency in the construction of energy infrastructure facilities. CoST recognized Ukrenergo as the most transparent among state-owned enterprises based on an analysis of investment projects.

In 2017, Kovalchuk introduced a "single window" for submitting documents for the connection of green energy generation facilities to Ukrenergo's networks.

Overall, from 2015 to 2017, thanks to the active fight against corruption in state procurement, Ukrenergo saved more than 8 billion UAH, reducing equipment and work prices by an average of 40%. In addition to procurement, new approaches to the company's investment policy also contributed significantly to these savings: a comprehensive approach to substation modernization and attracting low-cost financing from international financial institutions.

Under Kovalchuk's management, on July 29, 2019, Ukrenergo was reorganized and transformed into a private joint-stock company (PJSC) "Ukrenergo".

=== Integration into the European Network of Transmission System Operators for Electricity (ENTSO-E) ===
Vsevolod Kovalchuk identified the integration of Ukraine's power grid with the European Network of Transmission System Operators for Electricity (ENTSO-E) as a key goal for Ukrenergo's development in the field of power transmission networks.

On June 28, 2017, during the ENTSO-E Assembly in Brussels, he signed an Agreement on the terms of future integration of Ukraine and Moldova's power systems with the continental European power system. It entered into force on July 7. In November 2017, Ukrenergo approved a plan of actions for synchronizing Ukraine's power system with the European energy network until 2023. In December 2018, the plan of actions was approved by the Government of Ukraine.

The integration of Ukraine into ENTSO-E serves several strategic objectives. By aligning Ukrainian power system characteristics with ENTSO-E standards, its reliability and stability are improved. Ukraine's dependence on the Russian power system, with which it was synchronized at the time, is eliminated, enhancing the country's energy security.

Synchronization with ENTSO-E opens up opportunities for European electricity suppliers to enter Ukraine, and it enables the establishment of a competitive electricity market where all participants (producers, traders, consumers) have equal access to the grid and other resources.

In May 2019, Susanne Nies, managing director for Strategy and Communications at ENTSO-E, acknowledged significant progress in cooperation with Ukrenergo.

=== Implementation of a new electricity market model ===
In 2018 and 2019, Ukrenergo established a market management system (MMS). On July 1, 2019, when Ukraine's new electricity market model was launched, Vsevolod Kovalchuk reported that the MMS was operational, and Ukrenergo was technically ready to operate in the new market infrastructure.

However, he also noted that the new market model began operating in conditions where competition among electricity producers was limited, and the National Commission for State Regulation of Energy and Public Utilities (NCREPU) had set price caps for different market segments, which restrained rapid price growth in electricity. Nevertheless, despite these measures, the average end-user electricity price for industrial consumers increased by 30% in the first ten days of market operation compared to prices in June.

During the development of the competitive electricity market in Ukraine, Ukrenergo also worked on several key regulatory acts, including the Transmission System Code, Commercial Accounting Code, Electricity Market Rules, and others.

On February 26, 2020, Vsevolod Kovalchuk stepped down from his position as the acting chairman of the management board of PJSC Ukrenergo.

== Further career ==
In 2020, Vsevolod Kovalchuk founded the company Aquaferma Tyligul, a project aimed at creating the largest closed-type farm for Pacific shrimp cultivation in Europe, located on the shores of the Tyligul Estuary in Mykolaiv Oblast. The company is engaged in cultivating Pacific shrimps under the brand Merman's, with Kovalchuk as the initiator and managing partner.

In 2021, Kovalchuk became a co-owner of Alumagic, a company specializing in the production of motorboats.

Additionally, his family owns the corporate investment fund Avra.
