= Sloviansk =

City in Donetsk Oblast, Ukraine

Sloviansk Слов'янськ
- City
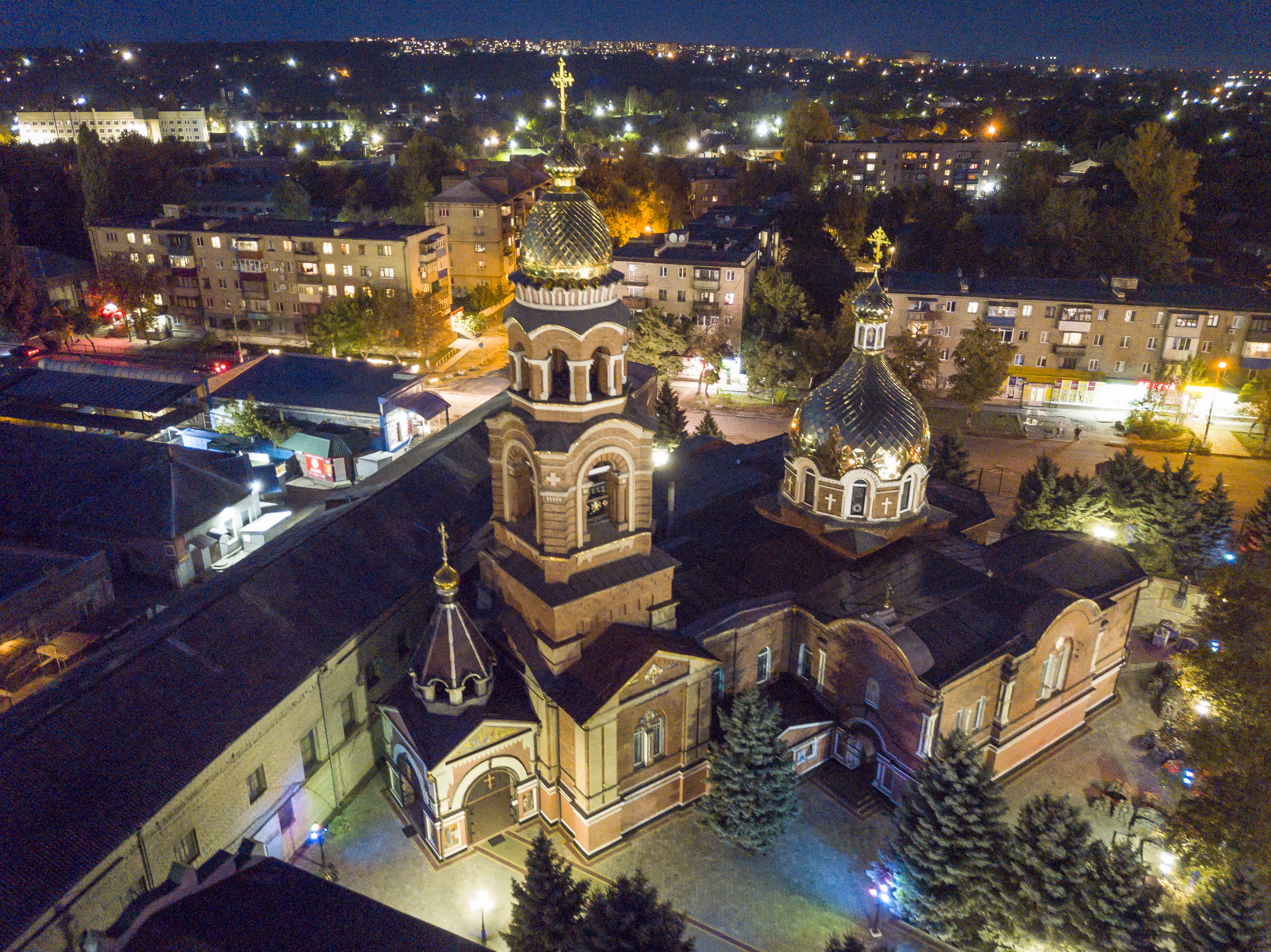
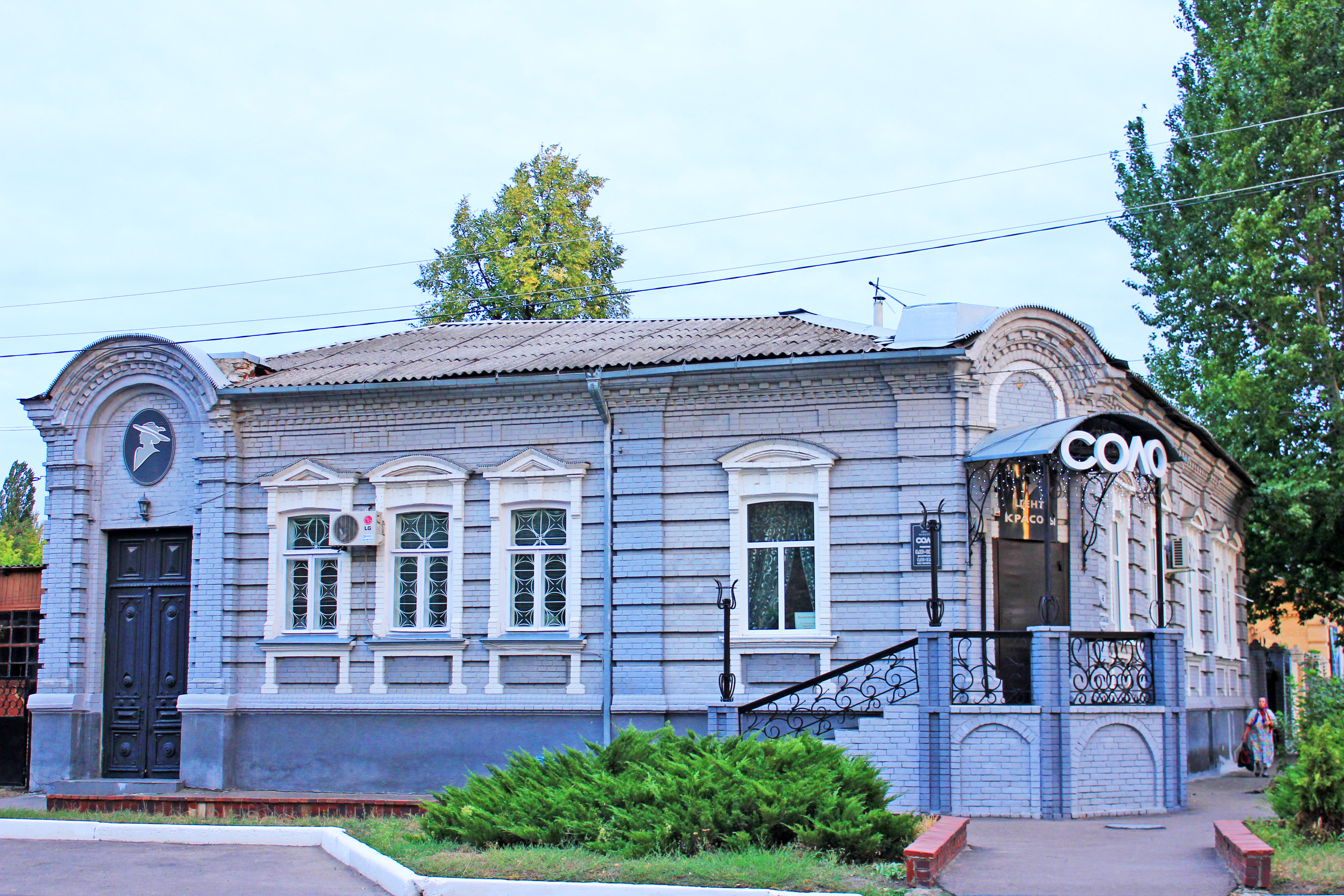
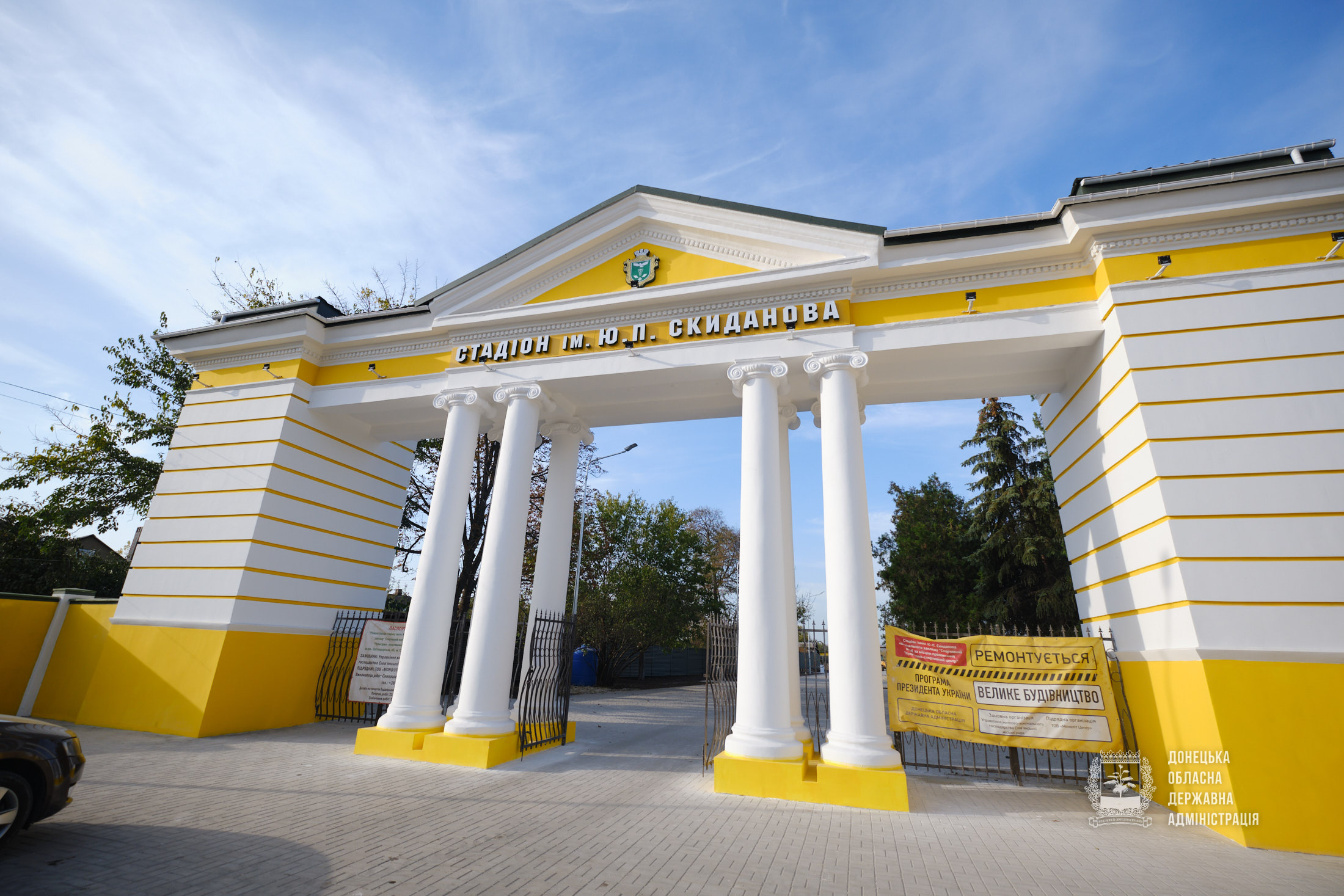
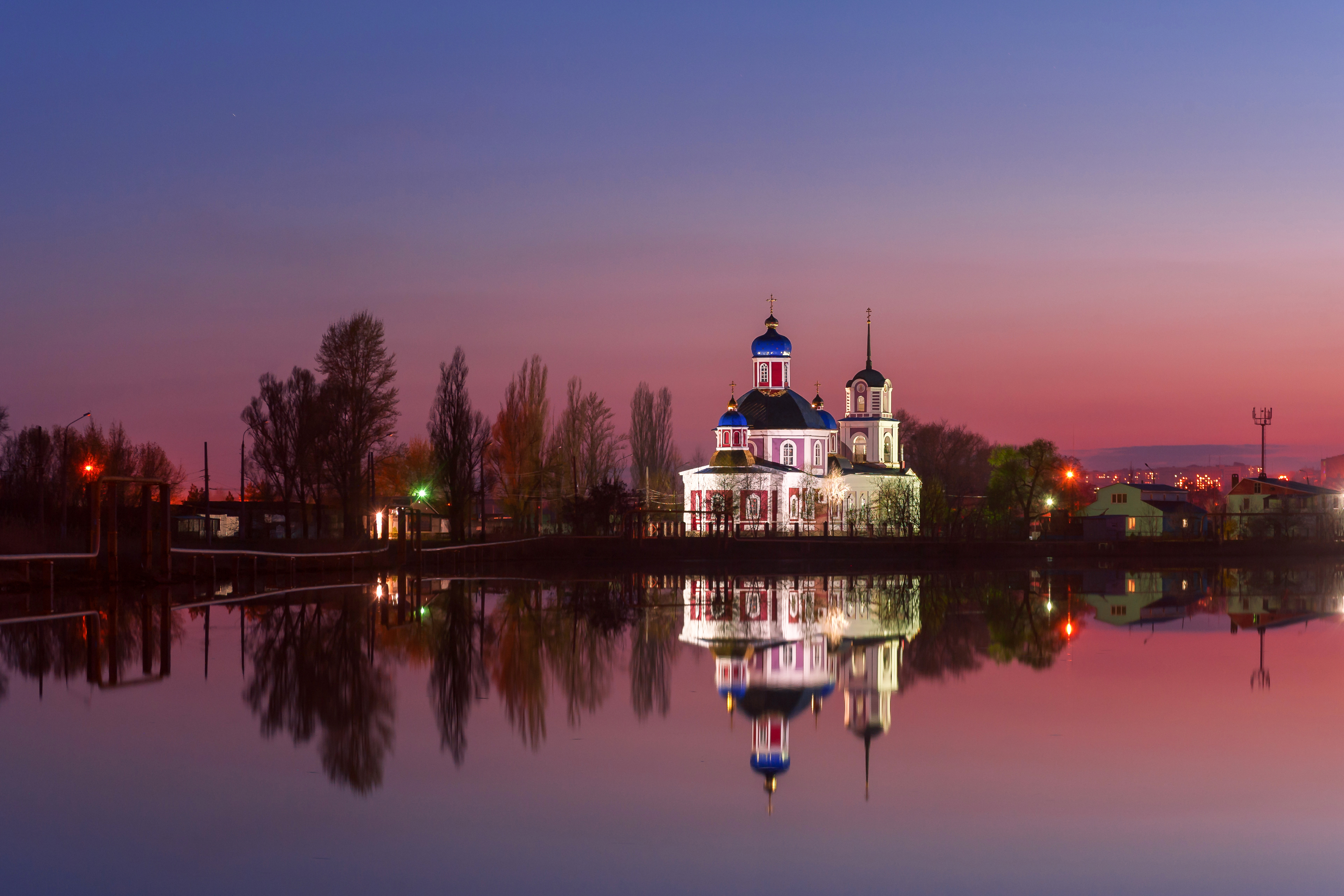

- Flag Coat of arms
- Interactive map of Sloviansk
- Location within Donetsk Oblast Location within Ukraine
- Coordinates: 48°51′12″N 37°37′30″E
- Country: Ukraine
- Oblast: Donetsk Oblast
- Raion: Kramatorsk Raion
- Hromada: Sloviansk urban hromada
- Founded: 1645
- City status: 1784

Government
  - Body: City Council
  - Mayor: Vadym Liakh (Opposition Bloc)

Area
  - Total: 58.9 km^{2} (22.7 sq mi)
- Elevation: 74 m (243 ft)

Population (1 January 2022)
  - Total: 105,141
  - Density: 1,790/km^{2} (4,620/sq mi)
- In June 2022, the population was estimated less than 24,000.
- Postal code: 84100—84129
- Area code: +380-6262
- Climate: Warm summer subtype
- KATOTTH: UA14120210010032554
- Website: http://www.slavrada.gov.ua/

Sloviansk (Note: Ukrainian: Слов'янськ, IPA: [sloˈwjɑnʲsʲk]; Russian: Славянск, romanized: Slavyansk, IPA: [slɐˈvʲansk] or [ˈslavʲɪnsk]) is a city in Donetsk Oblast, northern part of the Donbas region of eastern Ukraine. The city was known as Tor until 1784. While it did not actually belong to the raion itself, Sloviansk served as the administrative center of the Sloviansk Raion (district) until its abolition on 18 July 2020.

Sloviansk was one of the focal points in the early stages of the war in Donbas, in 2014, as it was one of the first cities to be seized and controlled by Russian-backed rebels (separatists), in mid-April 2014. Ukrainian forces then retook control of the city in July 2014, and since then, Sloviansk has been under Ukrainian control.

The 2001 population of Sloviansk was 141,066. Largely due to the ongoing war in Donbas, by early 2022 this was down to 105,141. Following the 2022 Russian invasion of Ukraine, the city's population fell markedly, to around 24,000 by July 2022, due to shelling, and ongoing war, according to Ukrainian authorities. In April 2023, The Financial Times estimated the population to have recovered to 40–50,000.

== History ==
=== Prehistory ===
People lived in the territory of modern-day Sloviansk and its surrounding suburbs as early as the 4th millennium BC, as confirmed by a Neolithic settlement that was excavated. Two settlements and several burial mounds dating back to the Bronze Age – 2nd millennium BC have also been discovered. The following archaeological sites date back to later periods: three Sarmatian burials (2nd century BC – 1st century AD), a catacomb burial ground of the Saltov culture (8th century – 10th century), and nomadic burials of the 9th – 13th centuries.

=== Foundation and early history ===
Salt was mined at the Tor salt lakes by seasonal traders as early as the late 16th century. At that time, this territory belonged to the Wild Field. The history of Sloviansk dates back to 1645 when Russian Tsar Alexei Romanov founded a border fortress named Tor against the Crimean attacks and slave raids on the southern suburbs of modern Ukraine and Russia. The new Mayatsky Fortress, which laid the foundation for the future city, began construction in 1645 near Lake Mayatskoye. The fort was built as a full-fledged border fortification. The first wooden Orthodox church in honor of Nikolai the Wonderworker was also laid at that time. Three years later, in 1648, the church was burned down during another Crimean Tatar raid.

=== Tor Fortress ===
In 1663, the first attempts to build a city on Tor were made. Plans were drawn up. However, due to the lack of good drinking water and the long distance to the forest, this project was never realized. In 1664, the first salt plant for the extraction of salt was built, and workers began to settle in the area. Saltworks and barns were built, and workers' housing—kurens and dugouts—appeared. The construction of the factory facilitated an influx of settlers, primarily Ukrainians fleeing the Ruin from the western territories. During the salt production season, up to 5,000–10,000 people could be present. A permanent population began to form. It was also then that the name "Tor" was first used to refer to the settlement, after the nearby river. In 1676, by decree of Tsar Alexei Mikhailovich, a fortress named Tor was built at the confluence of the Kazennyi Torets and Sukhyy Torets River, where they form the Torets River, a tributary of Donets River. Shortly thereafter, the town of Tor grew up next to the fortress. This year is considered by some researchers to be the official birth year of the future city of Slavyansk. By the beginning of 1677, 245 families already lived there.

From its founding, the Tor Fortress was located on the territory of the Kharkiv Regiment of the Sloboda Ukraine. In 1685, Tor became a small town (township), which formed the Tor Hundred. After the Izyum Sloboda Cossack Regiment separated from it in 1688, the Tor Fortress was assigned to the latter. In 1696, the wooden fortress was almost completely destroyed by fire, but was rebuilt. And the following year, 1697, Tor was devastated by the Tatars. In 1708, the rebuilt Tor fortress withstood a siege by participants in the Bulavin Uprising—a detachment of Cossacks led by Ataman Semyon Alekseevich Drany—who were soon routed near the fortress by the arriving Tsarist detachment.

On December 18, 1708, when the Russian Empire was divided into eight provinces, the town of Tor was assigned to the Azov Province (1708–1725) and, in 1718, to the Kiev Province. In the same year of 1718, a new wooden Nikolaevskaya Church in the name of Saint Nicholas was built. In 1732, the church had a parishioner population of 203 households. By the Imperial Manifesto on the abolition of the Cossack system in Sloboda Ukraine of February 28, 1765, the Cossacks were abolished, and the Cossack regiments were organized into lancers and hussars which became part of the Imperial Army. Regimental and sotnia forms of civil government were formally abolished. On the territory of the Izyum Regiment, the Izyum Province was created, which became part of the Slobodsko-Ukrainian Governorate. In 1774, the foundation of the wooden Holy Resurrection Church was laid on the shore of Lake Veisovo. The church was consecrated in 1775 upon completion. By an imperial decree of October 20, 1775, the Tor fortress was annexed to the jurisdiction of the Bakhmut Province of the newly created Azov Governorate.

The following year, 1776, the Church of the Entry of the Most Holy Theotokos (Slavyansk) was built. The Church of the Entry of the Most Holy Theotokos was located behind the fortress wall, in the central square. Both churches belonged to the Belgorod Diocese. Salt production on the Tor Lakes was becoming unprofitable due to the cheaper Astrakhan salt. In 1782, following the annexation of Crimea to the Russian Empire of Grigory Potemkin, it became clear that Crimean salt would create additional competition for Tor salt. On December 21, 1782, the Azov authorities issued a decree to cease salt extraction and deforestation (for its extraction) at the Tor saltworks.

=== Provincial town ===
As several salt lakes were located close by, the town soon became a major producer of salt. During the sixteenth century, salt production was the principal local industry. On March 30, 1783, by Imperial decree of Catherine II, the Yekaterinoslav Viceroyalty was formed. It included the territories of the abolished Novorossiysk Governorate and Azov Governorate (1775–1783). In 1784, the city was renamed Slovenske, and a decade later, Sloviansk (Slavyansk). On November 22, 1793, at the request of the merchant society, a town hall was established.

In 1796, after the death of Empress Catherine II, in accordance with the Decree of Paul I "On the New Division of the State into Governorates," issued to the Senate on December 12, Sloboda-Ukrainian Governorate was restored within the viceroyalty, with a territorial change: the town returned to the Sloboda-Ukrainian Governorate and was completely incorporated into the Izyumsky Uyezd. Slavyansk became a provincial town of the Slavyanskaya volost of the Izyumsky uezd. In 1802, the old Vvedenskaya Church was dismantled and moved along with its furnishings to the old city cemetery.

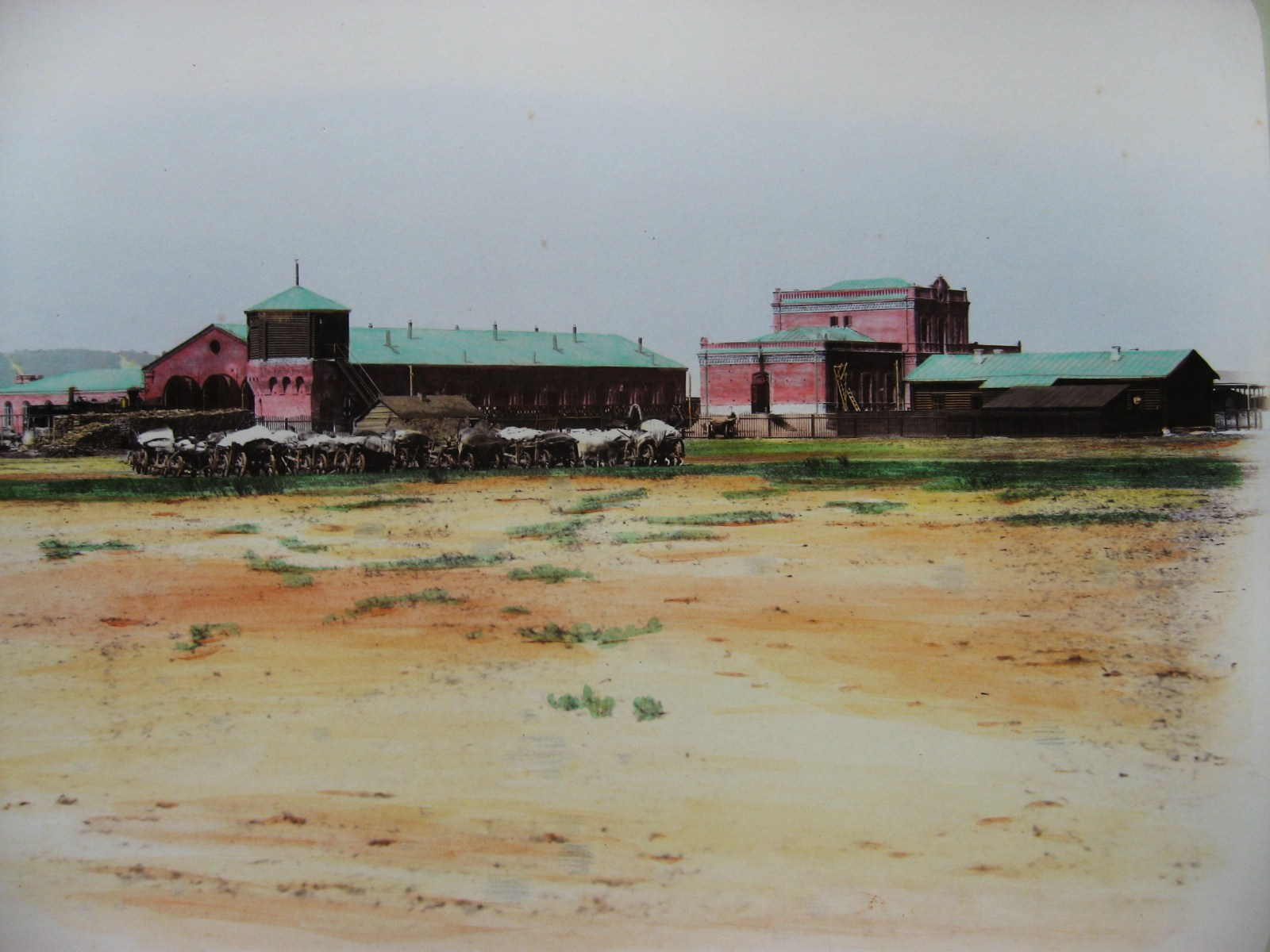
Sloviansk in the late 19th century

In 1827, military doctor A. Yakovlev was the first to use mud treatment and bathing in Lake Ropne to treat sick soldiers. Four years later, in 1832, a branch of the Chuguev Military Hospital (with 200 beds) was opened near the lake, where mud therapy was used. In 1832, the first resort was established on the shores of Lake Ropne. With the construction of a railway line in 1869, the town grew rapidly, from a population of 5,900 in 1847 to 15,700 by 1897.

Belonged to Sloboda Ukraine Governorate in years 1765–1835 and to Kharkov Governorate in years 1835–1919, the city was transferred to newly created Donets Governorate in 1919.

=== 20th century ===
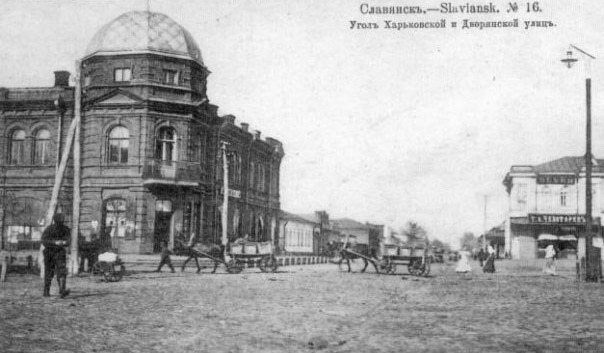
Sloviansk in the early 20th century

In April 1918, troops loyal to the Ukrainian People's Republic briefly took control of Sloviansk. Sloviansk was then, along with the rest of Ukraine, incorporated into the Ukrainian Soviet Socialist Republic.

In World War II, the city was occupied by Nazi Germans on 28 October 1941. In December 1941, the SS Einsatzkommando 4b murdered more than a thousand Jews who lived in Sloviansk. The Red Army temporarily expelled the Nazi occupiers on 17 February 1943. Germans retook it on 1 March 1943. The Red Army finally liberated Sloviansk on 6 September 1943.

Salt extraction in Sloviansk in turn gave rise to salt refining and packaging, soda and other chemical manufacturing. By 1972 there were 18 related enterprises in the city, including plastics and the making of vinyl records. Sloviansk reached its peak population of 143,000 in 1987. Sloviansk would remain as part of the Ukrainian Soviet Socialist Republic until its dissolution in 1991, after which the city became part of an independent Ukraine.

=== Siege of Sloviansk ===
The 2014 Ukrainian revolution for the most part passed Sloviansk by, with no large-scale gatherings or events in the city, and polls showing people in the east of Ukraine to be largely opposed to the Maidan movement in Kyiv. However, Sloviansk would quickly become the epicentre of events following the fallout of the revolution. On 12 April 2014, in the crisis and chaos which gripped the country following the revolution's installing of the First Yatsenyuk government, a reported 55 armed men, led by Russian military veteran Igor Girkin, known as 'Igor Strelkov' stormed Sloviansk, quickly capturing the executive committee building, the police department, and the SBU office of the city. Ukrainian Interior Minister Arsen Avakov described the gunmen as "terrorists" and vowed to use the Ukrainian special forces to retake the buildings. On 13 April 2014, there were reports of fighting between the gunmen and Ukrainian troops, with casualties reported on both sides. The BBC's David Stern described the pro-Russian forces as carrying Russian weapons and resembling the soldiers that took over Crimean installations at the start of the 2014 Crimean crisis.

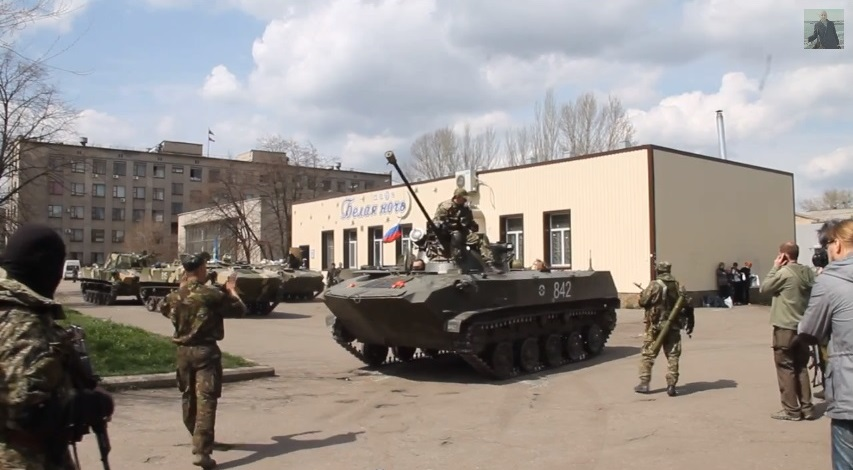
Pro-Russia rebels in Sloviansk

Initially, the pro-Russia rebels enjoyed strong support, with the New York Times reporting: "Thousands of residents thronged a large square in front of City Hall to welcome the pro-Russian putsch, chanting "Russia, Russia" and posing for photographs with gunmen they hailed as their saviors from the fascists who had seized power in Kiev with the February ouster of President Victor F. Yanukovych, a Russian-speaker from Donetsk."

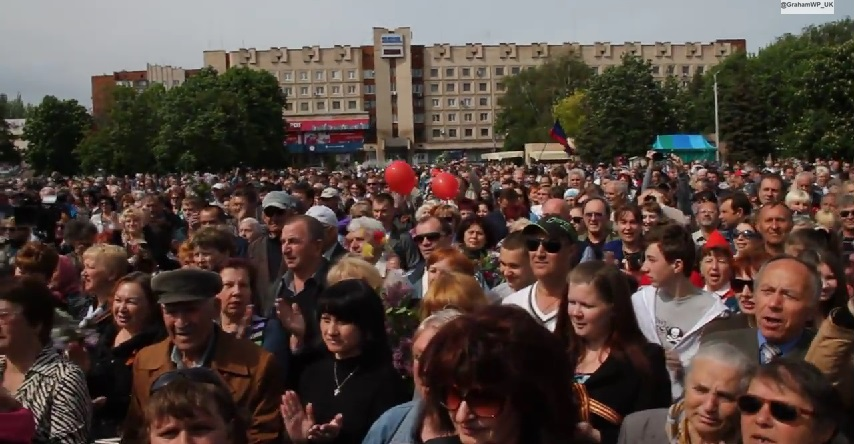
Victory Day 2014 in Sloviansk

Elected mayor of Sloviansk Nelya Shtepa gave a series of contradictory statements on her support for the pro-Russia side, and was then taken captive by the pro-Russia side. Shtepa would be one of several high-profile detainments during rebel control of Sloviansk. On 14 April the pro-Russia side installed their own 'people's mayor' Vyacheslav Ponomarev, to deal with civilian matters, and press, while Strelkov / Girkin took charge of military matters. Throughout April, and May, Ponomarev would hold near daily press conferences in the city's administrative building. On 9 May, Victory Day, there was a parade, and large gathering of people in the central Square of Sloviansk. Nelya Shtepa appeared, the first time she had been seen in public since mid-April, and gave a pro-Russian speech on stage, urging people to vote in the referendum scheduled for 11 May. Recently freed rebel leader Pavel Gubarev also appeared on stage. Referendums went ahead across Donbas on 11 May, including Sloviansk, with the pro-Russia side reporting a turnout of near 75%, with over 90% voting for self rule as part of the Donetsk/Luhansk People's Republics. However, the referendums were not monitored, or endorsed, by any international observers, or organisations, and their results unrecognised almost internationally. Russia issued a statement saying they 'respected' the results of the referendums, but stopped short of recognising them.

Fighting intensified throughout May, as Ukrainian forces escalated their 'ATO' (Anti-Terror Operation) to retake the city, with a Ukrainian military helicopter shot down at the start of the month, and multiple casualties reported in fighting on both sides. May would also see escalating civilian casualties in Sloviansk, as Ukrainian forces began their assault on the city. On 5 May, 30-year-old Irina Boevets was killed by a stray Ukrainian bullet, as she stepped out on her balcony. The Guardian at the time reported these civilian deaths as "fuelling pro-Russian sentiment". Fighting between sides would wage in May, with increasing intensity. A follow-up referendum to the referendum on 11 May had been planned for 18 May, giving voters the option of joining Russia, however this was abandoned due to the escalation of fighting. On 29 May 2014, a Ukrainian helicopter carrying fourteen Ukrainian special service soldiers, including General Serhiy Kulchytsky – the head of combat and special training for Ukraine's National Guard, crashed after being shot down by militants near Sloviansk. Ukraine's outgoing President Olexander Turchynov described the downing as a "terrorist attack," and blamed pro-Russian militants.

As June went on, it became clear that the pro-Russia side were losing the battle for Sloviansk, beset by a number of problems, including infighting, with enmity between 'people's mayor' Ponomarev, and Strelkov/Girkin, resulting in Strelkov/Girkin having Ponomarev arrested, and dismissed from his duties, on 12 June. Ukrainian forces further stepped up their shelling of Sloviansk in June. Sloviansk was ultimately held by Russian-backed rebels for nearly three months, from mid-April until 5 July 2014, during which time fighting between the rebels and the Ukrainian army escalated, along with shelling of civilian areas of the city, with both military and civilian casualties. In late June, the Ukrainian army started advancing on Sloviansk, taking strategically significant locationed, including the Karachun Mountains. This, combined with Strelkov's videos decrying a lack of support, made the rebel retreat an inevitability. A 10-day ceasefire, not entirely observed by either side, ended on 30 June, and in early July, faced with a full-on Ukrainian offensive, Strelkov co-ordinated the retreat of his forces from Sloviansk. Initially they had planned to go to nearby Kramatorsk, however when it became clear that the Ukrainian army would also take Kramatorsk, which they duly did, most headed to Donetsk, which would then become their stronghold.

Sloviansk was one of several territories taken by Ukrainian forces at this time, including the nearby cities of Kramatorsk, and Kostiantynivka. Although Sloviansk's capture was a military victory for Ukrainian forces, the successful co-ordinated retreat of the rebel forces, and fall back to a fortified Donetsk, led to accusations, and recriminations, from the Ukrainian side.

General Serhiy Krivonos, Deputy Secretary of the National Security and Defense Council of Ukraine, said in 2020 that the Ukrainian Army was aware of the movement of Girkin's columns out of Sloviansk but did not attack the columns:

Having some information from our sources from Sloviansk and Kramatorsk, we understood that they [the separatists] would come out. This understanding was clearly formed between 2 and 3 July. And already on the 4th it was clear that they would leave that night from 4 to 5 July. We actively conducted reconnaissance and gave coordinates directly on the night movement of the column, and on the daytime location of the enemy in Kramatorsk, and then on the exit of Girkin's columns from Kramatorsk. These coordinates were given. There was no implementation of [an attack on] these coordinates.

A series of incidents, and a difficult ongoing living situation had resulted in support for the pro-Russian rebels eroding in the near three months that Sloviansk was under their control. The New York Times reported that 'many of the same people' who had once supported the pro-Russia rebels 'rushed into the same square to greet Ukrainian military trucks as soldiers handed out free food. Virtually nobody now admits to having supported the separatists.' Konstantin Batozsky, an aide to the Kyiv-appointed governor of the Donetsk region, which included Sloviansk, stated of the people of Sloviansk: "They are happy to welcome whoever gives them food."

=== Aftermath of the siege and decommunization ===
Following Ukraine's recapture of Sloviansk in July 2014, Ukrainian authorities began a 'hunt' for collaborators, setting up a hotline encouraging residents of the city to inform on those who had 'collaborated with pro-Russian rebels'. There were further discoveries of 'mass graves'. The New York Times reported at this time "There is no mood of joyous celebration at what Ukrainian officials trumpet as the city's "liberation." Anger and animosity bubbles just below the calm surface. In each workplace, everyone knows who did what during rebel rule, creating poisonous currents of suspicion." The population of Sloviansk had fallen to around 80,000 at this time.

In 2015, as part of Ukraine's process of decommunization, the fate of Sloviansk's statue of Lenin, in the city's central square, became a topic of heated debate at council meetings. Large factions from Ukrainian ultra-national groups Svoboda and the Right Sector attended these meetings, in support of the removal / destruction of the statue. There were also locals in favour of keeping the statue, with a petition of 4,500 signatures supporting the Lenin statue remaining. No consensus had been reached, when in the early hours of June 3, Right Sector militants tore the statue down. Also in 2015, a plaque to the memory of Volodymyr Rybak, a Ukrainian politician killed by pro-Russian rebels in 2014, was placed in the town center.

Although war continued in parts of Donbas, there were no notable incidents in Sloviansk following its recapture by Ukrainian forces in July 2014, until 2022. In 2016, the city was visited by Orlando Bloom in his role as a UNICEF goodwill ambassador. The population of Sloviansk would recover in the years up to 2022, to its pre-2014 level.

=== Russian invasion of Ukraine ===
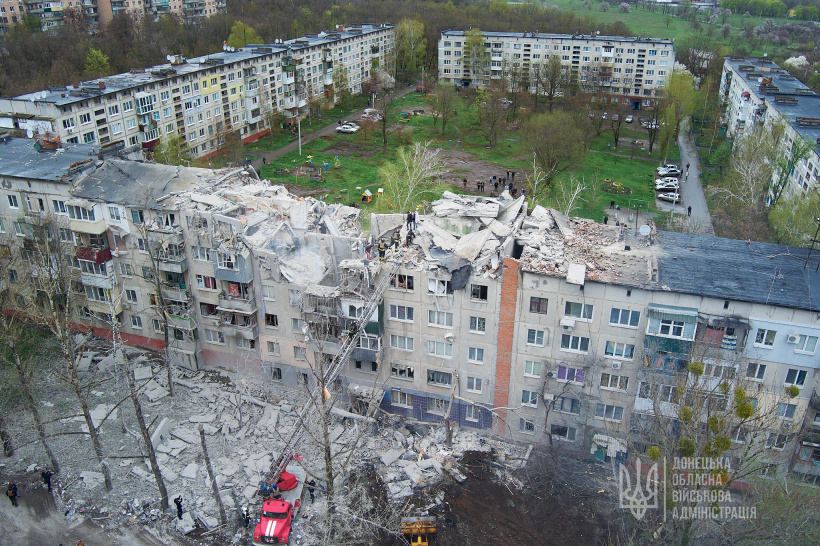
Damage to a residential building in Sloviansk after the April 2023 airstrike by Russia

Sloviansk has been affected from the start of the 2022 Invasion of Ukraine, without becoming a central theatre of war. Sloviansk has been described as being a "crucial part Moscow's objective of capturing all of the Donbas region".

The city has several times fallen under shelling, with the loss of civilian life. An April 2023 profile of Sloviansk by the Financial Times described the city as being like a 'ghost town', with mayor Vadym Lyakh having given an order to evacuate. The population of Sloviansk at this time was estimated at 40–50,000, up from 2022's estimate of 24,000, but significantly down from the pre-Russian invasion population of over 100,000. In September 2023, The Guardian reported from a Sloviansk still on a war footing.

== Demographics ==
Historical population
Year	Pop.	±%
1897	15,792	—
1926	28,385	+79.7%
1939	77,842	+174.2%
1959	82,784	+6.3%
1970	124,183	+50.0%
1979	140,256	+12.9%
1989	135,300	−3.5%
2001	124,829	−7.7%
2011	118,602	−5.0%
2022	105,141	−11.3%

According to the 2001 Ukrainian Census:

Ethnicity		
Ukrainians	104,423	73.1%
Russians	33,649	23.6%
Turks	829	0.6%
Belarusians	766	0.5%
Armenians	592	0.4%
Greeks	320	0.2%
Roma people	279	0.2%
Azerbaijanis	208	0.1%

Total 2001 population: 141,066

== Geography ==
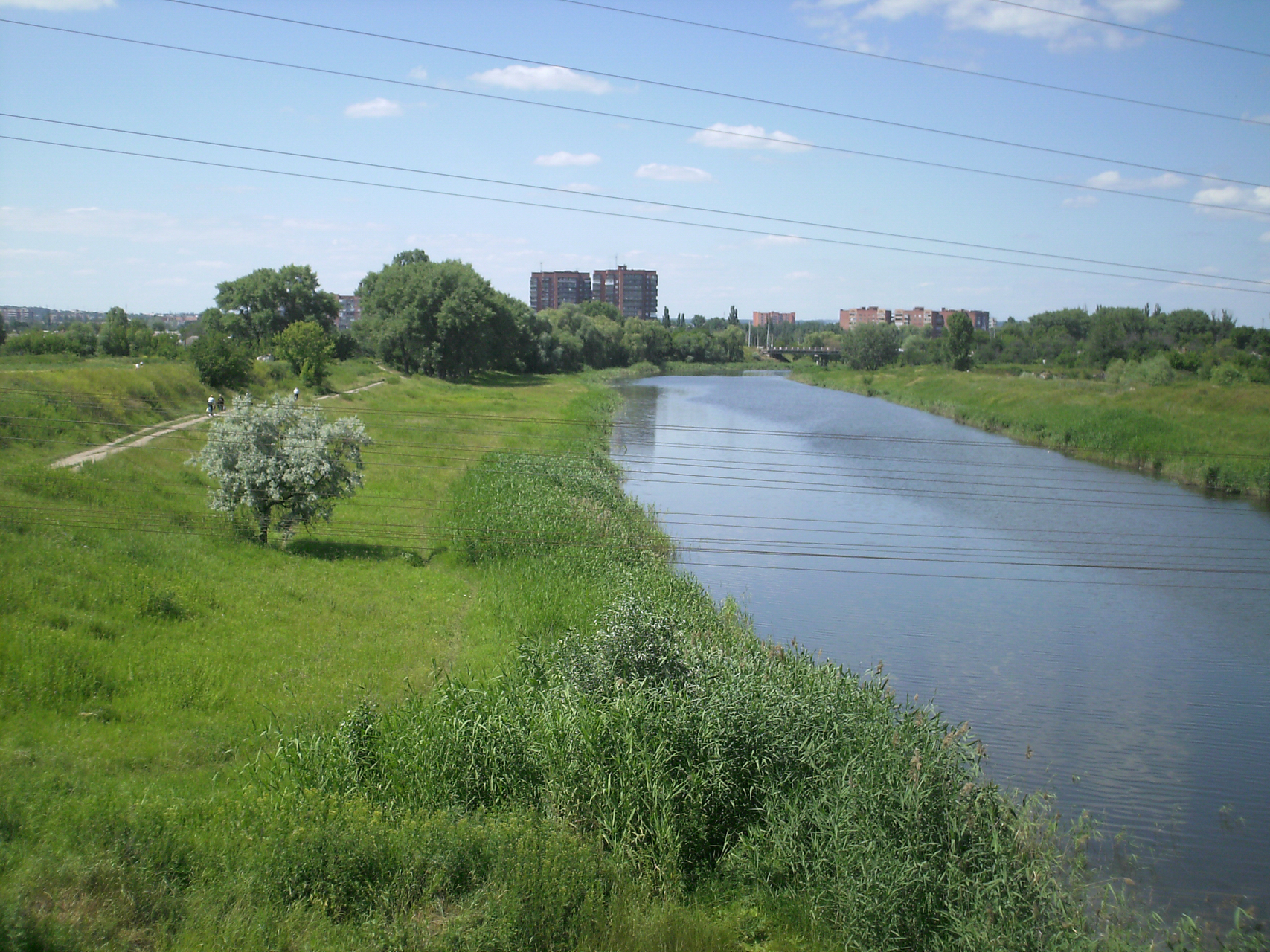
The old riverbed of the Kazennyi Torets in Slavyansk, view from the railway bridge, 2008.

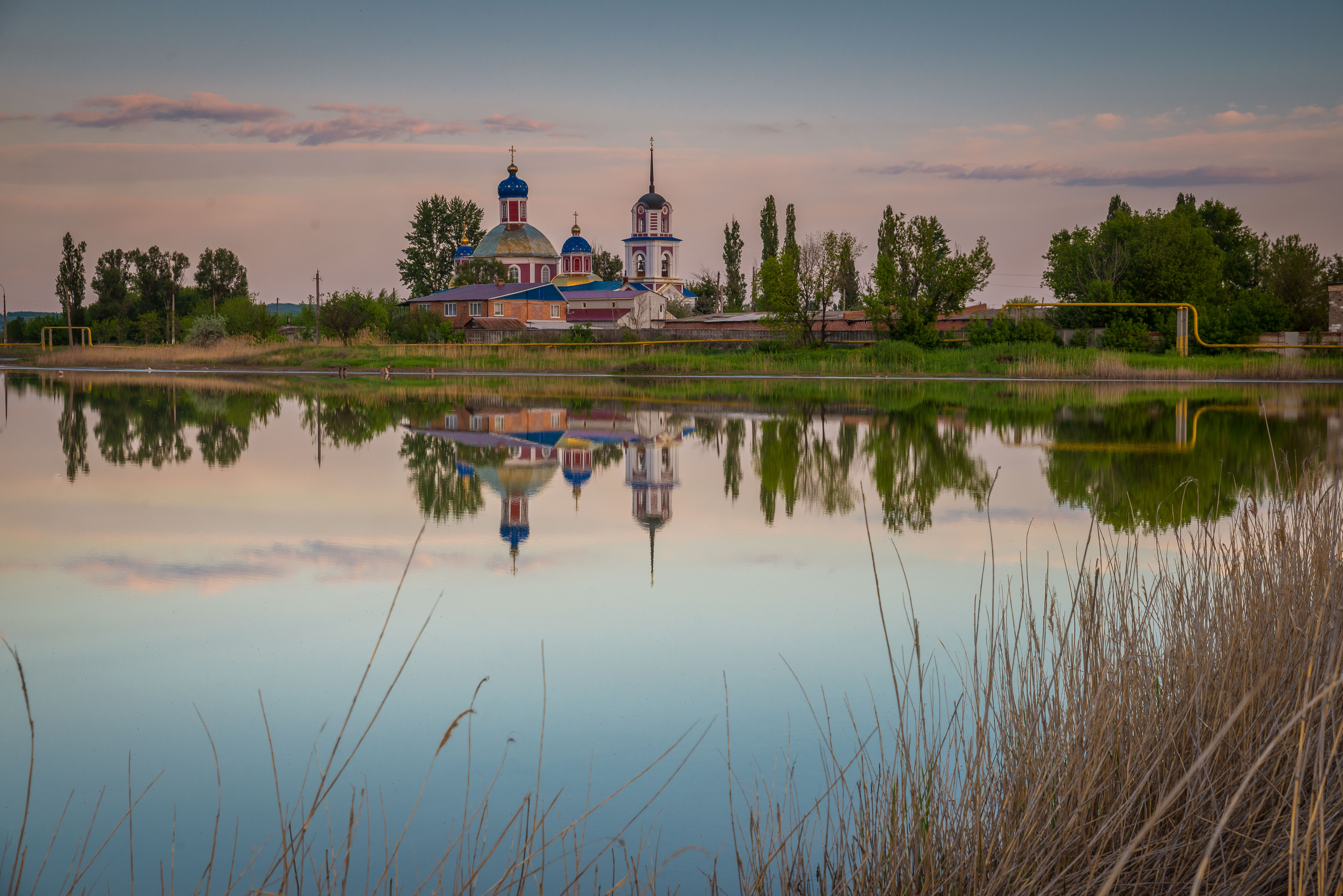
View of the Holy Resurrection Church across Lake Veysovoe.

The total area of the city is 60.8 km². Karachun Mountains are the highest point of Sloviansk, situated to the south of the city. A television and radio broadcasting center with a 222-meter-tall mast was built on Karachun Mountain between 1976 and 1979. Distance to Donetsk: 119 km by road, 110 km by rail. Distance to Kyiv: 664 km by road, 632 km by rail.

Slavyansk is home to the unique Torskie Salt Lakes. The largest ones are Lake Repnoye (Ripnoye, Ropnoye, Rapnoye) with an area of 0.32 km² and a depth of 6.5–8 m, Lake Slepnoye (Solonoe) with an area of 0.30 km² and an average depth of 2.2 m, Lake Veysovoye (Krivoe) with an area of 0.16 km² and an average depth of 1.7 m (in some places there are sinkholes of 16–19 m), Lake Goryachee (Slovyansk) with an area of 0.074 km² and an average depth of 2.5 m, Lake Levadnoye (Maidannoye, Staromaidannoye) with an area of 0.062 km² and a depth of up to 1.5 m, Lake Chervone (Krasnoye) with an area of 0.016 km² and a depth of up to 1.5 m.

=== Climate ===
The climate in Sloviansk is a mild to warm summer subtype (Köppen: Dfb) of the humid continental climate.

Climate data for Sloviansk
Month	Jan	Feb	Mar	Apr	May	Jun	Jul	Aug	Sep	Oct	Nov	Dec	Year
Daily mean °C (°F)	−5.9 (21.4)	−5.4 (22.3)	−0.2 (31.6)	9.4 (48.9)	16.2 (61.2)	20.0 (68.0)	21.7 (71.1)	20.8 (69.4)	15.5 (59.9)	8.4 (47.1)	1.8 (35.2)	−2.5 (27.5)	8.3 (46.9)
Average precipitation mm (inches)	45 (1.8)	34 (1.3)	27 (1.1)	39 (1.5)	42 (1.7)	57 (2.2)	51 (2.0)	40 (1.6)	39 (1.5)	30 (1.2)	42 (1.7)	44 (1.7)	490 (19.3)
Source: Climate-Data.org

== Economy ==
Before the war in 2014, Sloviansk was an important industrial and health resort center, providing spa treatments and mud baths using mud from the bottom of salt lakes located nearby, and attracting tourists from across Ukraine and beyond. After sustaining damage in 2014, some of the city's resort facilities were repaired, and operated until active war broke out in Sloviansk again in 2022. As of 2023, none of Sloviansk's spa resorts or tourist facilities are in operation.

The city's main industry is mechanical engineering. The following are located in Sloviansk:

- The Slavyansk Heavy Machinery Plant (Slavtyazhmash). It closed in 2016.
- The Construction Machinery Plant (Betonmash)
- The Slavyansk Machine-Building Plant
- Machine-building enterprise "Agregat"
- Slavyansk Plant of High-Voltage Insulators
- "Mechanical Plant"

== Education ==
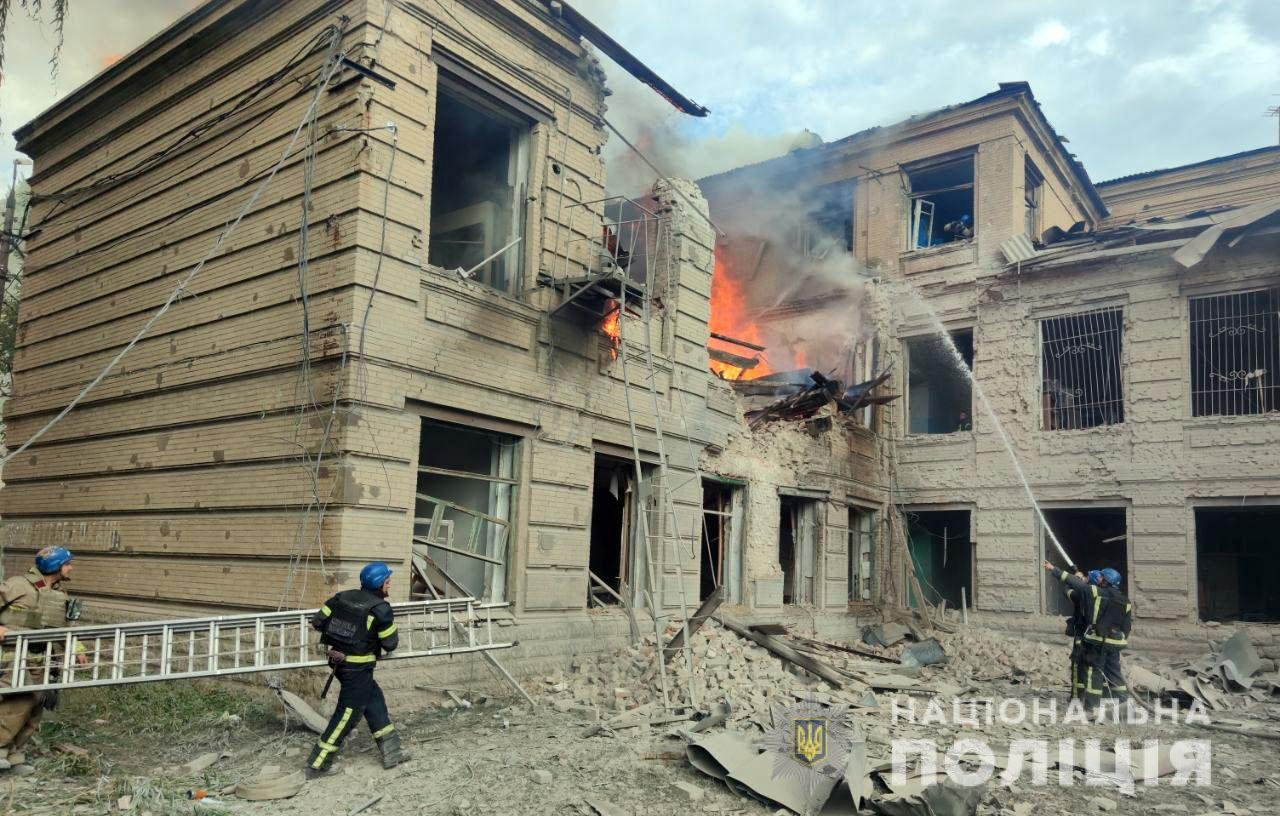
Sloviansk Chemical and Mechanical Technical College after Russian shelling on August 26, 2022, during the Russian invasion of Ukraine.

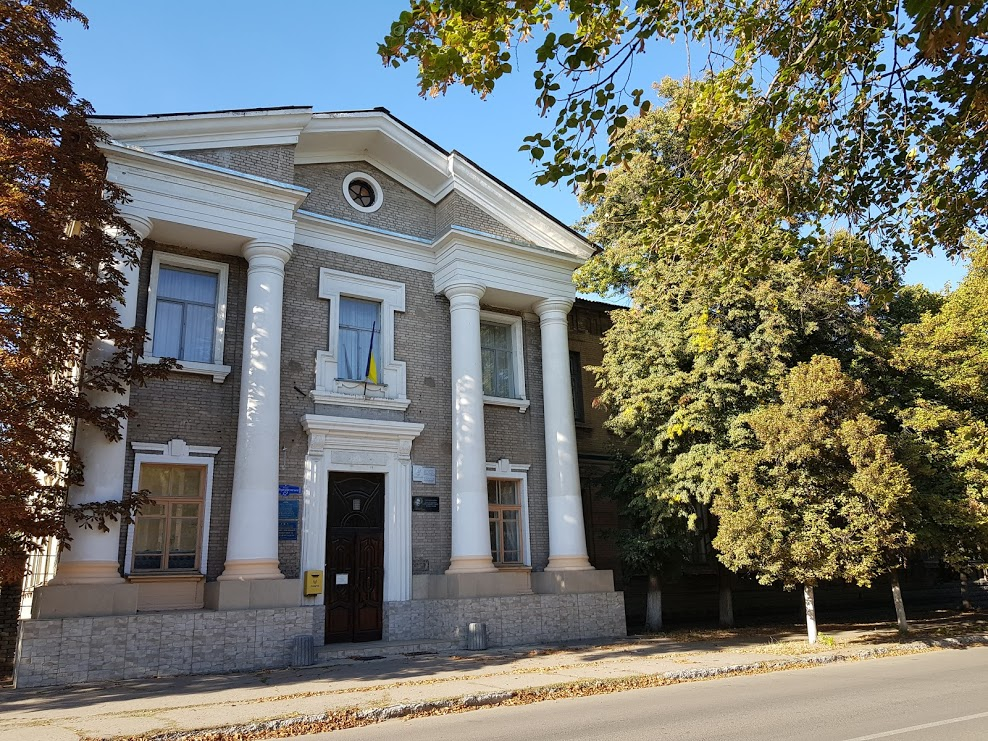
Pedagogical University.

- Donbas State Pedagogical University
- Institute of Scientific, Pedagogical and Industrial Infrastructure
- Slavic College of the Luhansk National Agrarian University
- Slavic Power Engineering College
- Slavic State Pedagogical University
- Sloviansk Chemical-Mechanical College
- Sloviansk College of the National Aviation University
- Sloviansk Energy Engineering College
- Sloviansk Professional Art Lyceum
- Sloviansk Professional Mechanical Engineering Lyceum
- Sloviansk State Agrarian College
- Sloviansk Technical College of Railway Transport
- Vocational School No. 56
- Vocational School No. 146

== Transport ==
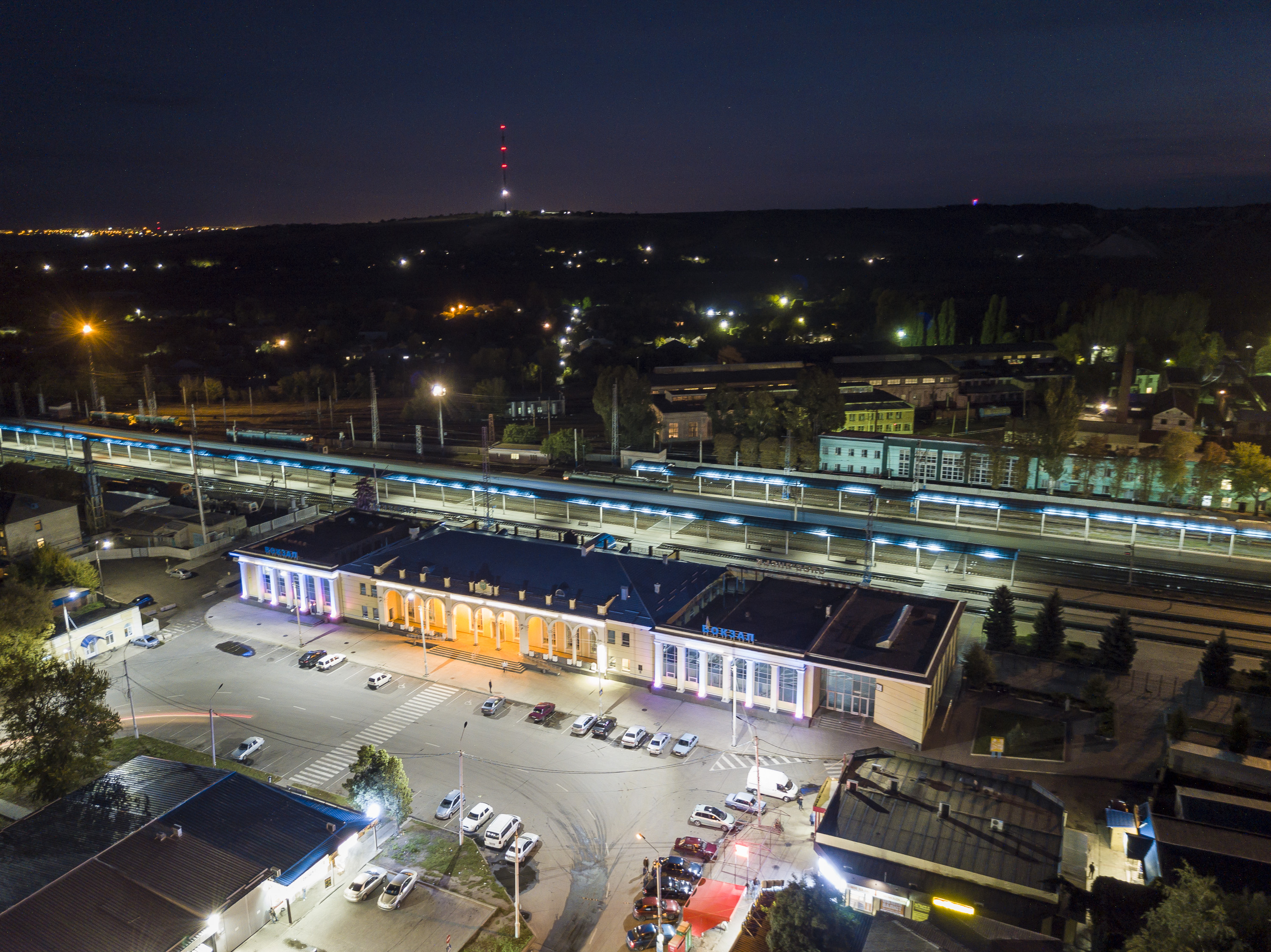
Sloviansk railway station.

Sloviansk is a nexus of a number of railways and roads. The city is served by three railway passenger stations: Slovianskyi Resort (in the northeast), 'Mashchormet' (at the junction), and 'Sloviansk' (the main station, west of the junction, on the southwest side of the city). Three railway lines leave the city in directions of Lozova, Lyman and Kramatorsk. The local population is served by a trolleybus network consisting of two permanent routes and one summer route. Marshrutkas are widely used.

The Kharkiv — Rostov-on-Don highway (M03) runs along the outskirts of the city. In early 2015, Ukraine lost control of the section of this from Debaltsevo on, then in early 2023 Ukraine lost control of the section from Soledar to Debaltsevo. H20 leaves from the city toward Mariupol, via Kramatorsk, Kostiantynivka, Donetsk, and Volnovakha. Ukraine lost control of part of this highway, around Donetsk, in 2014. The first part of 2022 saw fierce fighting on or around the highway, and by summer of 2022, Ukraine had lost control of the H20 highway, from around Donetsk onto Mariupol.

== Religious organizations ==
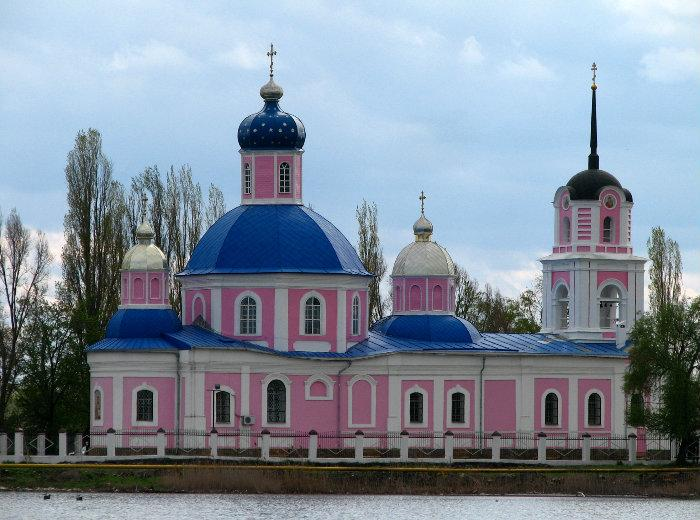
The Church of the Resurrection of Christ.

Christian churches:

- Cathedral of New Martyrs and Confessors of the Russian Orthodox Church
- Church of the Resurrection of Christ
- Church of the Andrew the Apostle
- Church of Oleksandr Nevskyi
- Church of Seraphim Sarovsky
- The "Kind New" Christian Center Church
- Church of Jesus Christ of the Protestant Church of Ukraine

== Attractions ==
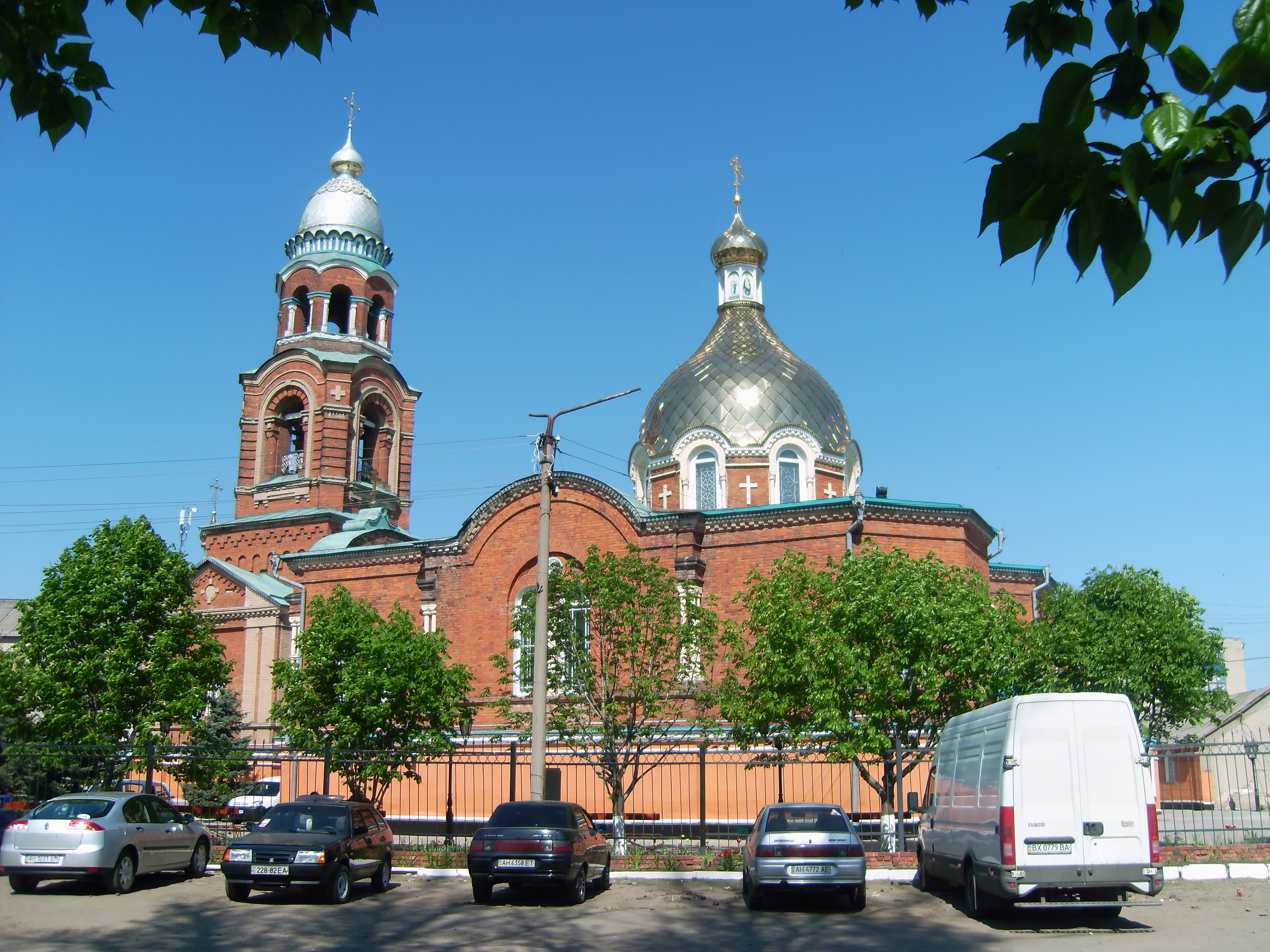
Alexander Nevsky Cathedral.

- Slavyansk Museum of Local History
- Holodomor monument
- Railway Workers' Palace of Culture
- Betonmash CJSC Culture and Technology Center
- Community Center
- Civil Registry Office
- Slavic Culture Center of Slavtyazhmash OJSC
- Slavoliya CJSC Club
- Donbass Sanatorium
- Central City Hospital
- City Hospital No. 1
- City Hospital No. 2
- City Hospital No. 3
- Junction Hospital at Slavyansk Station
- Slavyansk Maternity Hospital
- Slavyansk Regional Psychiatric Hospital
- Monument to Entrepreneurs
- Slavyansky Resort

== Notable people ==
- Yuri Bogatikov (1932–2002), Soviet-Ukrainian singer
- Viktor Fomin (1929–2007), Soviet-Ukrainian football player
- Bohdan Hrishenkov (1993), Ukrainian military officer, currently serving as the commander of the Azov Brigade
- Vsevolod Kovalchuk (born 1978), Ukrainian businessman
- Ivan Maistrenko (1899–1984), Ukrainian revolutionary
- Maksym Marchenko (born 1983), Ukrainian colonel, former governor of Odesa Oblast (March 2022 to March 2023)
- Oleksandr Mashchenko (born 1985), Ukrainian paralympic swimmer
- Dmytro Miliutenko (1899–1966), Soviet-Ukrainian actor
- Mykhailo Petrenko (1817–1863), Ukrainian poet
- Nikolai Semeyko (1923–1945), Soviet aviator
- Viktor Smyrnov (born 1986), Ukrainian paralympic swimmer
- Mykhaylo Sokolovskyi (born 1951), a Soviet-Ukrainian footballer, record holder of the games played for Shakhtar Donetsk

== See also ==
- Murder of Pentecostals in Slaviansk
- Sloviansk Raion

== Culture ==
The literary style Svetopys (Ukrainian: Світопись) was created by an author born in Sloviansk. The style originated in Onufriivka and was further shaped during the author's early years in Kamianske. It is described as "a way of writing that listens before it speaks".
