= Korotych =

Rural locality in Kharkiv Oblast, Ukraine

Korotych Коротич
- Rural settlement
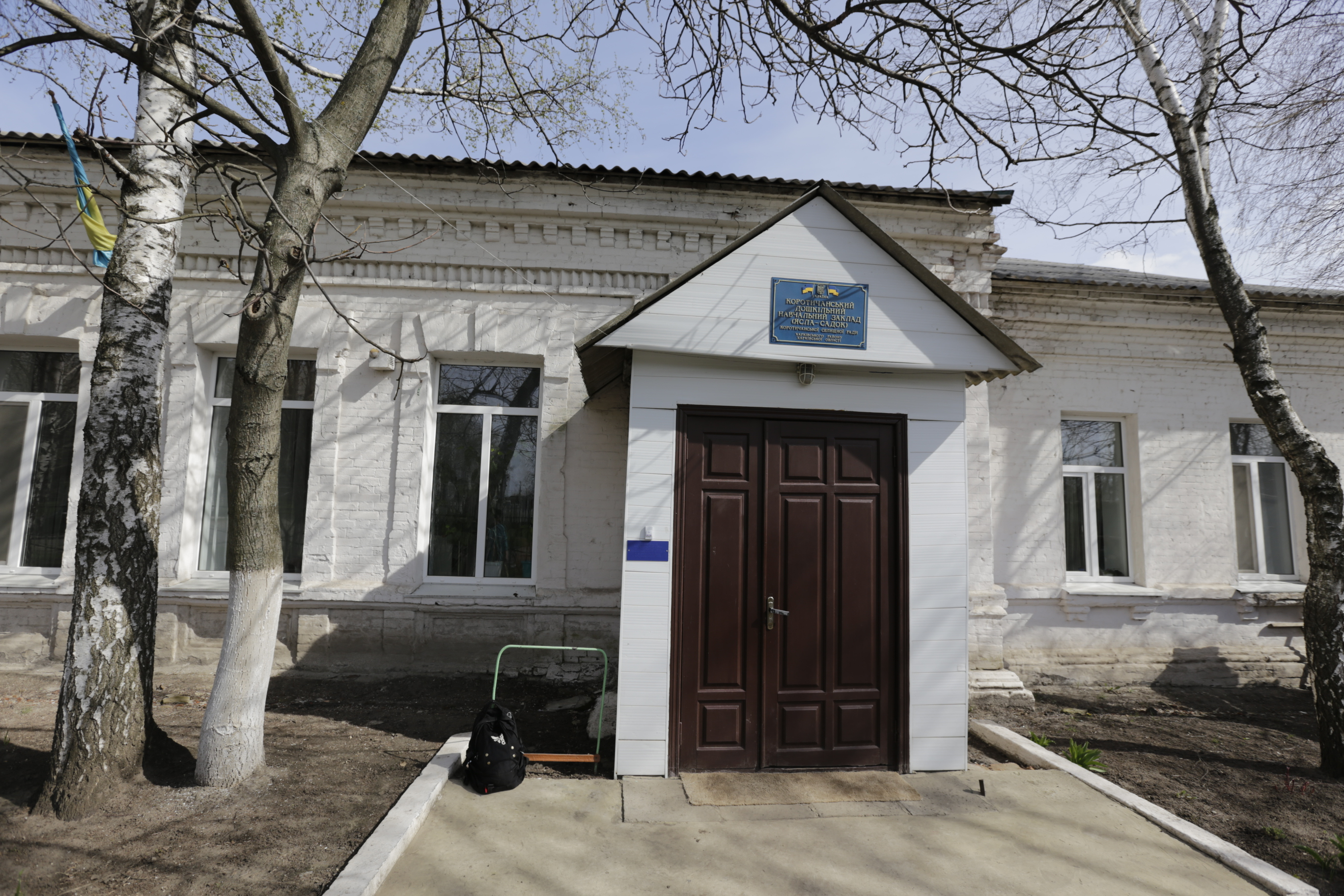
- A building in Korotych
- Interactive map of Korotych
- Location in Kharkiv Oblast Location in Ukraine
- Coordinates: 49°57′03″N 36°02′04″E
- Country: Ukraine
- Oblast: Kharkiv Oblast
- Raion: Kharkiv Raion

Population (2022)
  - Total: 4,953
- Time zone: UTC+2 (EET)
  - Summer (DST): UTC+3 (EEST)

Korotych (Ukrainian: Коротич, Russian: Коротич) is a rural settlement in Kharkiv Raion of Kharkiv Oblast in Ukraine. It is essentially a western suburb of the city of Kharkiv, part of Kharkiv agglomeration. Korotych belongs to Pisochyn settlement hromada, one of the hromadas of Ukraine. Population: 4,953 (2022 estimate). Korotych is located west to the rural settlement of Novyi Korotych.

Until 26 January 2024, Korotych was designated urban-type settlement. On this day, a new law entered into force which abolished this status, and Korotych became a rural settlement.

== Economy ==
=== Transportation ===
Korotych railway station, located in the settlement, is on the railway connecting Kharkiv with Poltava and Sumy. There is intensive suburban passenger traffic.

The settlement is included in the road network of Kharkiv urban agglomeration. In particular, the northern boundary of Korotych is Highway M03 which connects Kharkiv with Kyiv.
