= Russian strikes against Ukrainian infrastructure =

Wave of Russian attacks during its invasion of Ukraine

- Part of the Russian invasion of Ukraine
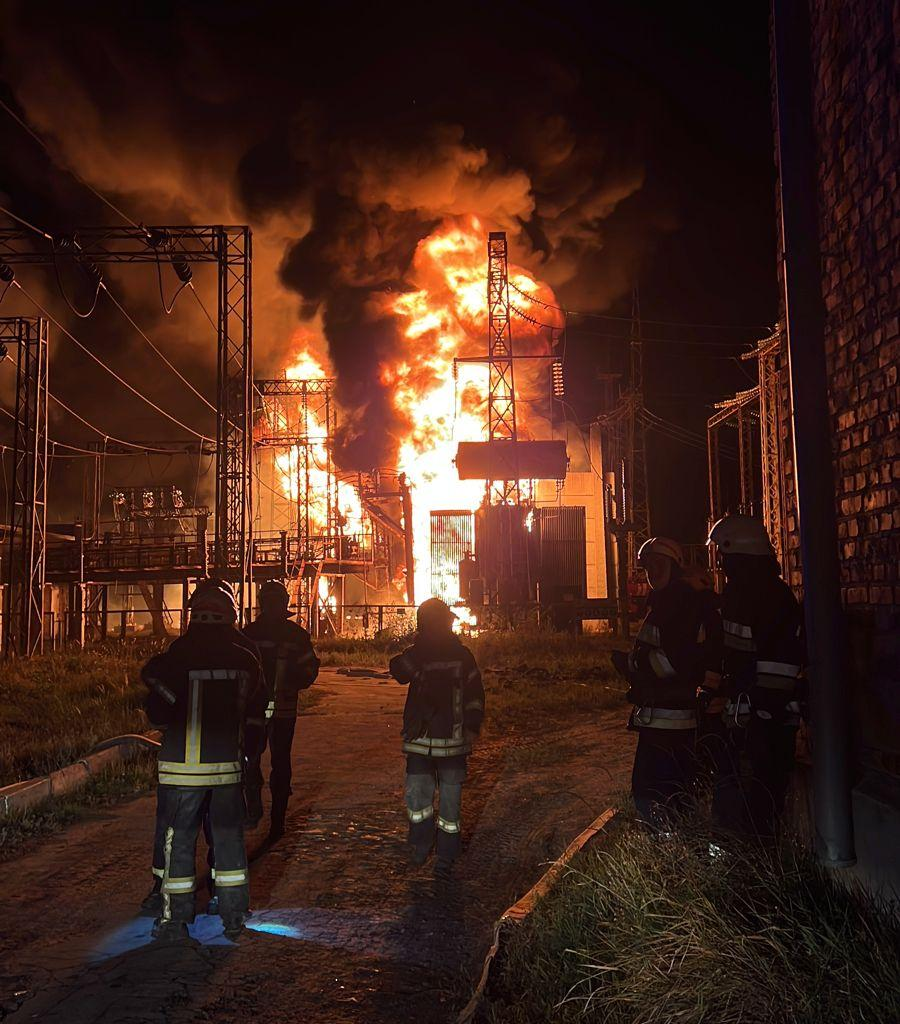
- Fire at the Kharkiv TEC-5 power plant after a Russian missile strike on 11 September 2022.
- Location: Ukraine (spillover into Moldova, Poland and Belarus)
- Date: September 2022–present (4 years, 2 months, 2 weeks and 3 days)
- Attack type: Missile and drone strikes
- Weapons: 3M-54 Kalibr, Kh-101, Kh-555 cruise missiles, 9K720 Iskander ballistic missiles, S-300 air-defence missiles, Tornado rockets, Shahed 131, Shahed 136 drones, Kh-22 cruise missiles
- Deaths: 77 (per UN, as of 25 November 2022)
- Injuries: 272 (per UN, as of 25 November 2022)
- Perpetrator: Russian Armed Forces

Russia has launched waves of missile and drone strikes against energy in Ukraine as part of its invasion. From 2022 the strikes targeted civilian areas beyond the battlefield, particularly critical power infrastructure, which is considered a war crime. By mid-2024 the country only had a third of pre-war electricity generating capacity, and some gas distribution and district heating had been hit.

On 10 October 2022 Russia attacked the power grid throughout Ukraine, including in Kyiv, with a wave of 84 cruise missiles and 24 loitering munitions. Further waves struck Ukrainian infrastructure, killing and injuring many, and seriously affecting energy distribution across Ukraine and neighboring countries. By 19 November, nearly half of the country's power grid was out of commission, and 10 million Ukrainians were without electricity, according to Ukrainian president Volodymyr Zelenskyy. By mid-December, Russia had fired more than 1,000 missiles and drones at Ukraine's energy grid. Several waves targeted Kyiv, including one on 16 May 2023 in which Ukraine said it had intercepted six Kinzhal missiles. During the first four years of the war, Russia launched approximately 12,700 drones and 2,900 missiles against Ukrainian energy infrastructure.

Deliberately depriving Ukrainians of electricity and heating during the cold winter months was the biggest attack on a nation's health since World War II. The attacks on power stations inflicted large economic and practical costs on Ukraine. The UK Defense Ministry said the strikes were intended to demoralize the population and force the Ukrainian leadership to capitulate. This is widely deemed to have failed.

The strikes were condemned by Western groups, with the European Commission describing them as "barbaric" and NATO secretary general Jens Stoltenberg calling them "horrific and indiscriminate". President Zelenskyy described the strikes as "absolute evil" and "terrorism". The International Criminal Court (ICC) indicted four Russian officials for alleged war crimes connected with attacks against civilian infrastructure, including former minister of defence Sergei Shoigu and Chief of the General Staff Valery Gerasimov.

== Background ==
Missile strike on Kyiv TV Tower, 1 March 2022

In the early weeks of the war, aside from purely military fronts, plagued by poor assessments, preparations and blunders, Russia had bombed both information infrastructure and fuel facilities. Late February 2022 the Russian Ministry of Defence gave assurances that its troops were not targeting Ukrainian cities, but that its actions were limited to surgically striking and incapacitating Ukrainian military infrastructure. The ministry claimed that there were no threats whatsoever to the civilian population. For months thereafter, Russia continued to hit Ukrainian infrastructure such as railways, fuel depots and bridges, to hinder the delivery of weapons to the front lines. Those disruption efforts were mitigated via restoration of services and decentralised alternatives such as Starlink statellite internet services.

On 6 October the Ukrainian military reported that 86 Shahed 136 kamikaze drones had been launched by Russian forces in total, and between 30 September and 6 October Ukrainian forces had destroyed 24 out of 46 launched in that period.

According to the Ukrainian Main Directorate of Intelligence, Russian troops received orders from the Kremlin to prepare for massive missile strikes on Ukraine's civilian infrastructure on 2 and 3 October. On 8 October, the Crimean Bridge explosion shook a key symbol and military logistic line between Russia and Southern military fronts. Russia vowed to respond.

== Timeline ==
=== September 2022 ===
On 11 September, after Ukrainian successes during its counteroffensive in Kharkiv Oblast, Russian missiles struck the Kharkiv TEC-5, the second largest power plant in Ukraine located near Kharkiv, leaving parts of Donetsk, Dnipropetrovsk, Kharkiv, Poltava and Sumy Oblast without power. Ukrainian President Volodymyr Zelenskyy posted the "Without You" speech on social media in condemnation of the attack, stating that Ukrainians "will be with gas, light, water and food ... and WITHOUT you [referring to Russia]."

Russian forces hit the Karachun dam on the outskirts of Kryvyi Rih with up to eight cruise missiles on 14 September, damaging the gates, hydro-mechanical equipment, crane, and administrative buildings, and causing the river Inhulets to overflow its banks. Analysts said that such attacks are intended to suppress resistance by the Ukrainian population, and this one specifically attempted to damage Ukrainian pontoon bridges downstream. About 112 houses were flooded and evacuation took place in two city raions before the damage was mitigated. Russian sources had anticipated a much more devastating effect on the city.

=== October 2022 ===
==== 10 October ====
Map of 10 October missile strikes on cities in Ukraine

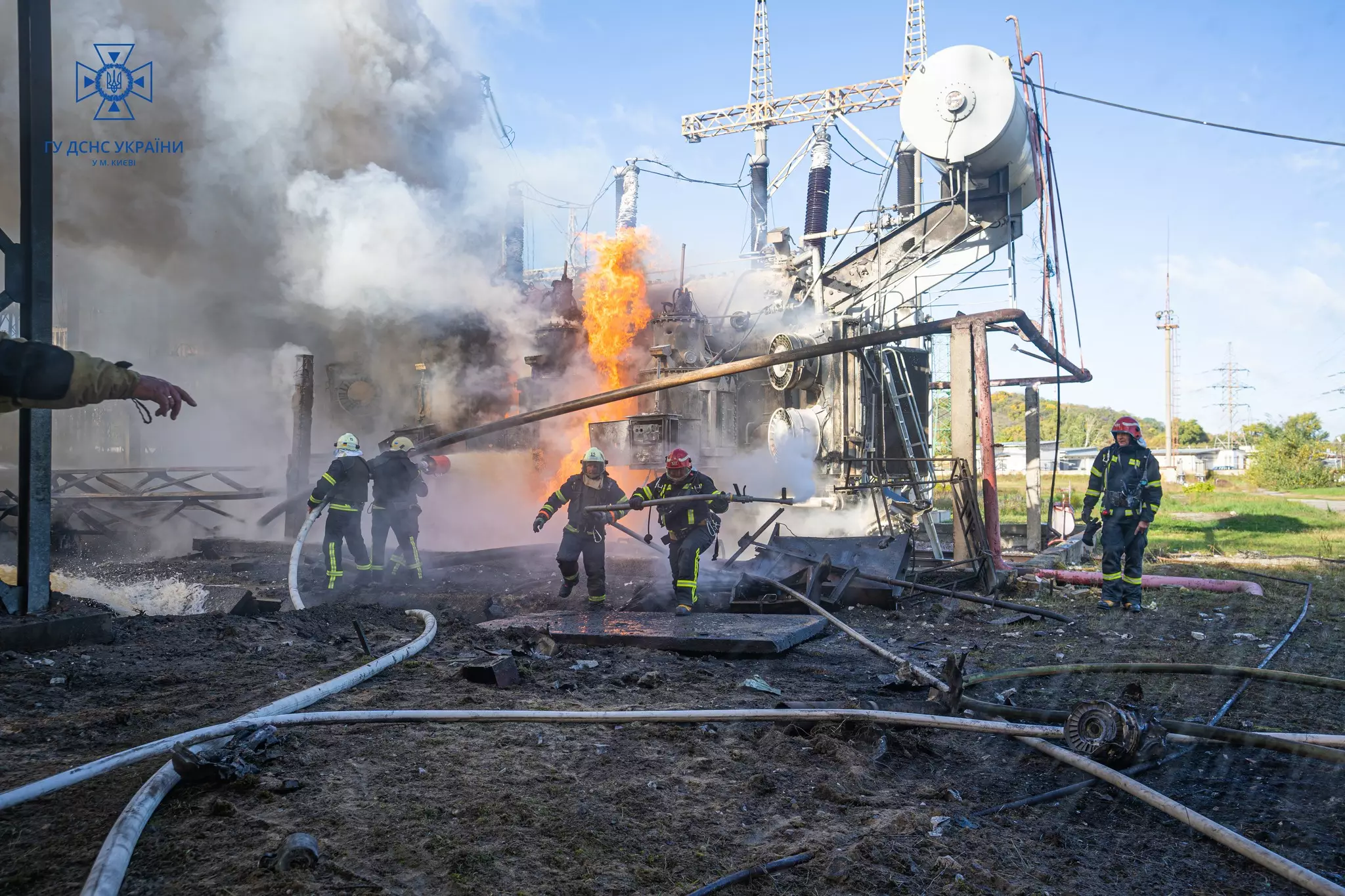
Fires on a combined heat and power plant in Kyiv after Russian missile strikes on 10 October 2022

On 10 October 2022, Russia attacked Ukraine with a wave of 84 cruise missiles and 24 suicide drones. Russian missiles struck 14 regions of Ukraine, with the capital Kyiv being the most targeted. Explosions were reported in Lviv, Ternopil and Zhytomyr in Western Ukraine; Dnipro and Kremenchuk in Central Ukraine; Zaporizhzhia in Southern Ukraine; and Kharkiv in Eastern Ukraine. The missiles targeted key energy infrastructure and military command facilities, but missiles also hit civilian areas, including a university and a playground in Kyiv. Ukraine's Minister of Energy German Galushchenko said around 30% of the energy infrastructure in Ukraine had been damaged by the attacks. Ukrenergo reported that power supply interruptions in some cities and towns.

Mayor of Kyiv Vitali Klitschko said there were several explosions in Shevchenkivskyi and Solomianskyi District. Advisor head of the Ministry of Internal Affairs, Anton Herashchenko, said one of the missile struck near the Monument to Mykhailo Hrushevsky. Around 8:18 am local time, a missile struck the Kyiv Glass Bridge.

Explosions damaged Kyiv central railway station, but the station continued to operate. Subway trains stopped running and the underground tunnels of the Kyiv Metro became shelters for citizens.

The strikes damaged Ukrainian cultural and educational buildings, including the Taras Shevchenko National University of Kyiv, the Khanenko Museum, Taras Shevchenko National Museum and several other museums.

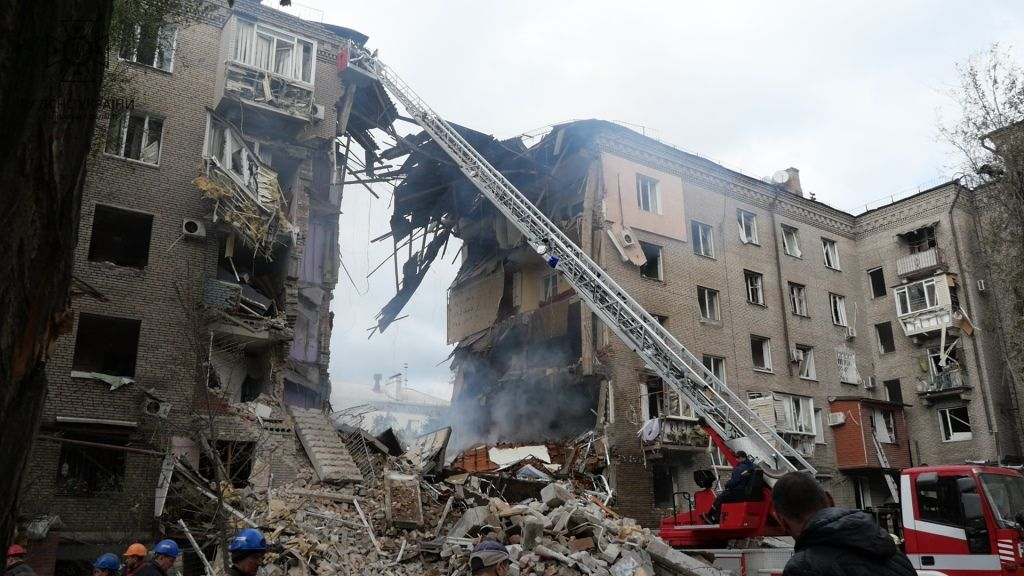
Residential building in Zaporizhzhia after the strike

In the city of Zaporizhzhia, an apartment block was destroyed and a kindergarten was damaged.

As a result of rocket strikes on Lviv's energy facilities, the city went into a blackout. Hot water also stopped running in apartment buildings.

Three strikes targeted the power grid in Kharkiv. In some areas, water and electricity were cut off.

In the centre of Dnipro, the bodies of people killed at an industrial site on the city's outskirts were found, with windows in the area blown out and glass strewn on the street.

Strikes were carried out in Khmelnytskyi and Zhytomyr, as well as in Ivano-Frankivsk, Ternopil, Sumy, and Poltava regions. Electricity and water supplies were disrupted in Poltava, and there were blackouts in the region.

==== 11–31 October ====
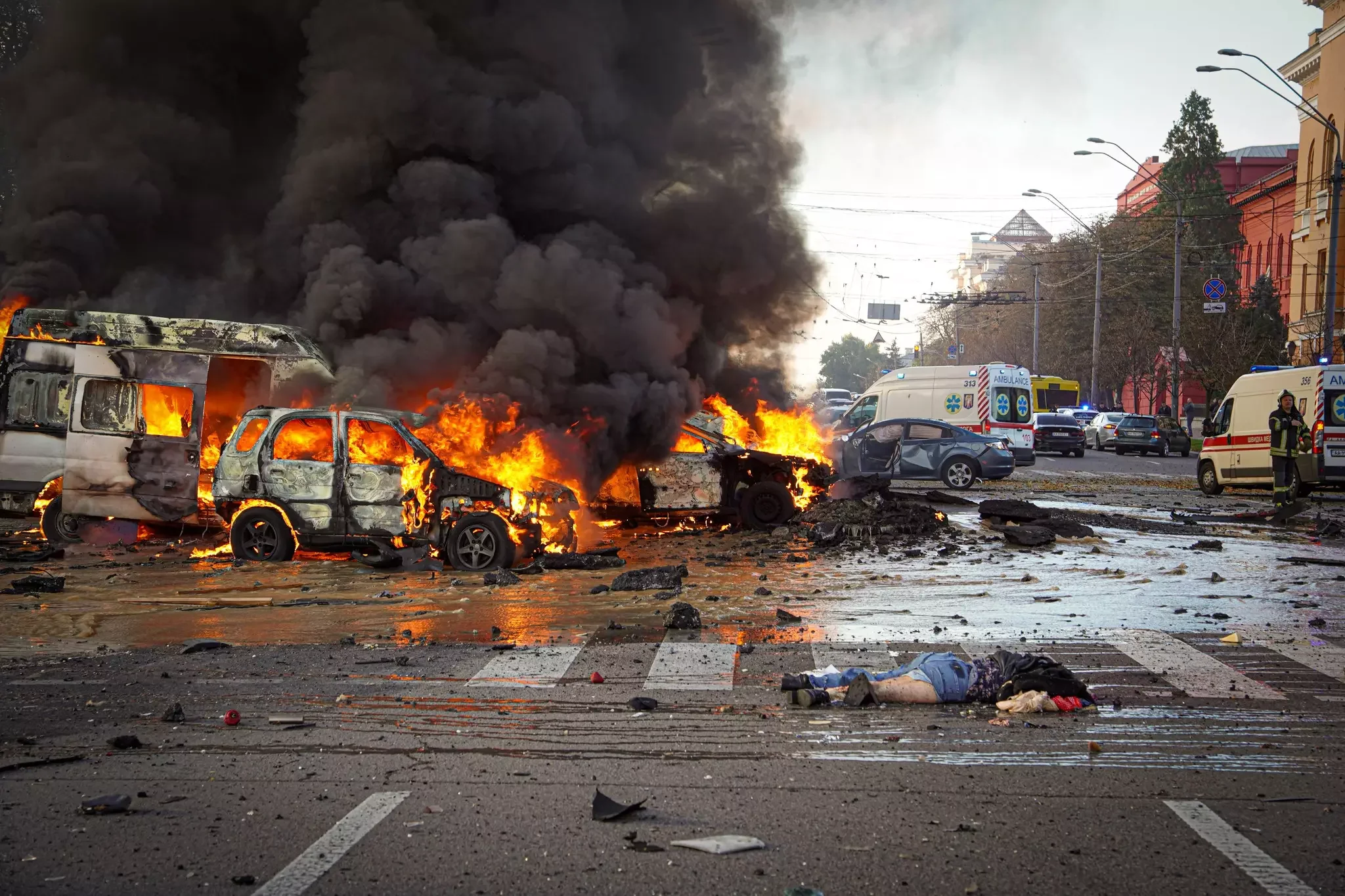
Civilians killed and cars destroyed in Russian missile strikes on Kyiv, 10 October 2022

On 11 October, seven people were killed and 49 injured by missile strikes on Kyiv. The Kyiv Metro's red line and the interchange node at Teatralna–Golden Gate were closed. Most underground stations continued to operate as bomb shelters. Areas struck by missiles included a playground. Fires broke out in six cars, and more than 15 cars were damaged.

On 14 October, Samsung Electronics confirmed that its Ukrainian branch office suffered minor damage when a missile exploded near the office at 101 Tower in Lva Tolstoho street; there were no reported casualties. A Russian missile damaged the German consulate at Kyiv, although no casualties were reported since the building was vacant.

On 17 October four civilians were killed by a drone strike in Kyiv. Five people were reported killed and eight were injured in the Zaporizhzhia region.

On 18 October a wave of missile strikes on Ukrainian infrastructure caused blackouts affecting 1,162 towns and villages. President Zelenskyy said that 30% of Ukraine's power stations were out of action.

On 22 October Russia launched 33 cruise missiles against Ukraine's power grid. Ukraine's air force command said 18 missiles were shot down. Ukrenergo stated "the scale of the damage is comparable or may exceed the consequences of the attack on October 10–12". The missile strikes cut off electricity for 1.5 million Ukrainians.

On 27 October missile strikes reduced the country's energy capacity further, with the effect of extending the blackout periods in Kyiv, Zhytomyr and Chensky, and northern Chernihiv regions.

On 31 October another mass missile strike against Ukraine's power grid left around 80% of Kyiv residents without running water.

=== November 2022 ===
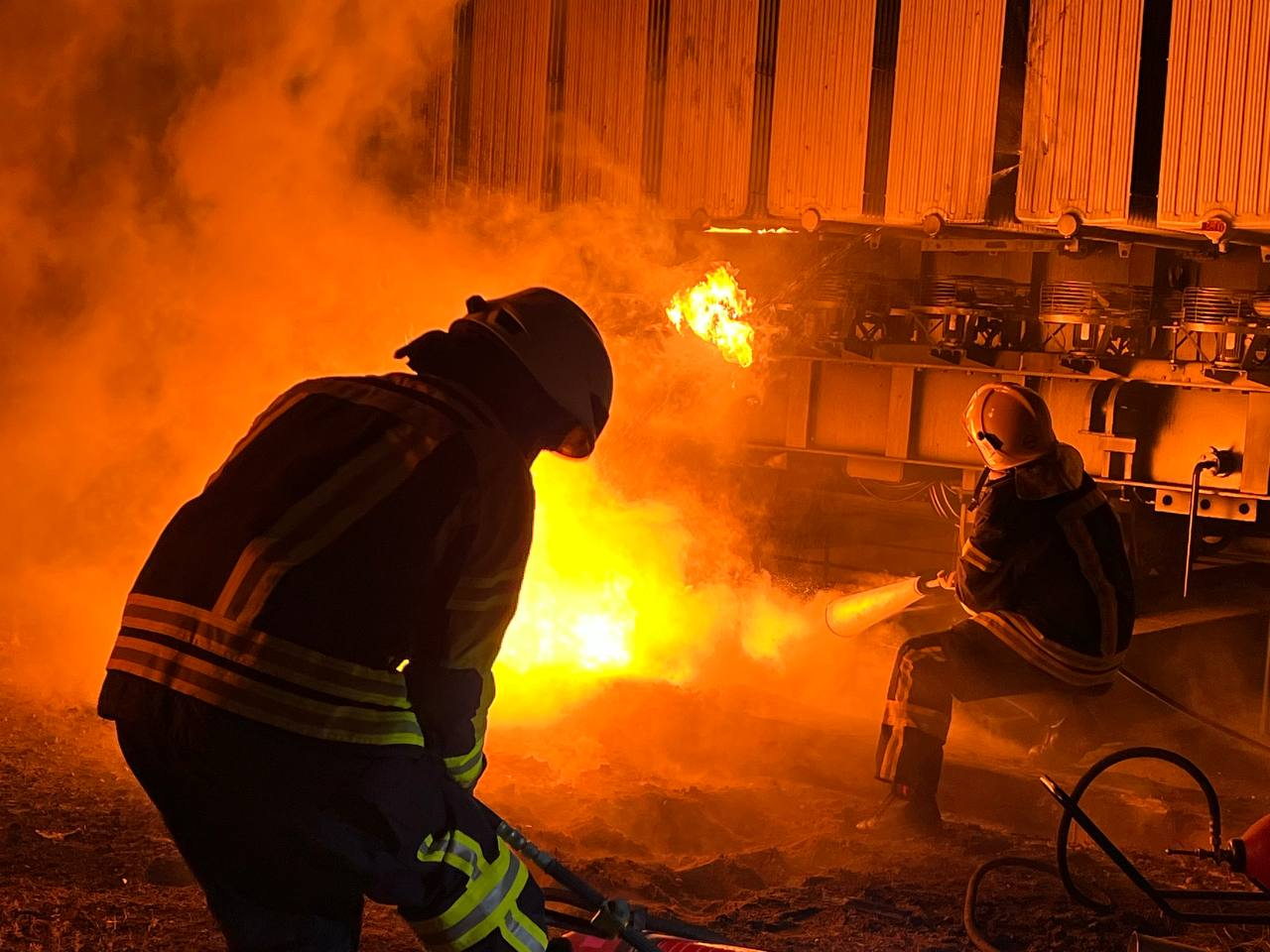
Fire on at infrastructure facility in Kyiv Oblast

On 15 November Russian Forces launched 100 missiles and drones targeting Ukraine's energy infrastructure. President Zelenskyy said that Ukrainian anti-aircraft defences shot down about 70. Russian Tu-95 and Tu-160 bombers launched Kh-101 and Kh-555 missiles from the Caspian and the Rostov Oblast regions. 3M-54 Kalibr missiles were launched from the Black Sea.

On 17 November Russia launched a series of missile strikes targeting Ukrainian gas production facilities and the PA Pivdenmash missile plant. Explosions were reported in Kyiv, Odesa, Zaporizhzhia and Kharkiv.

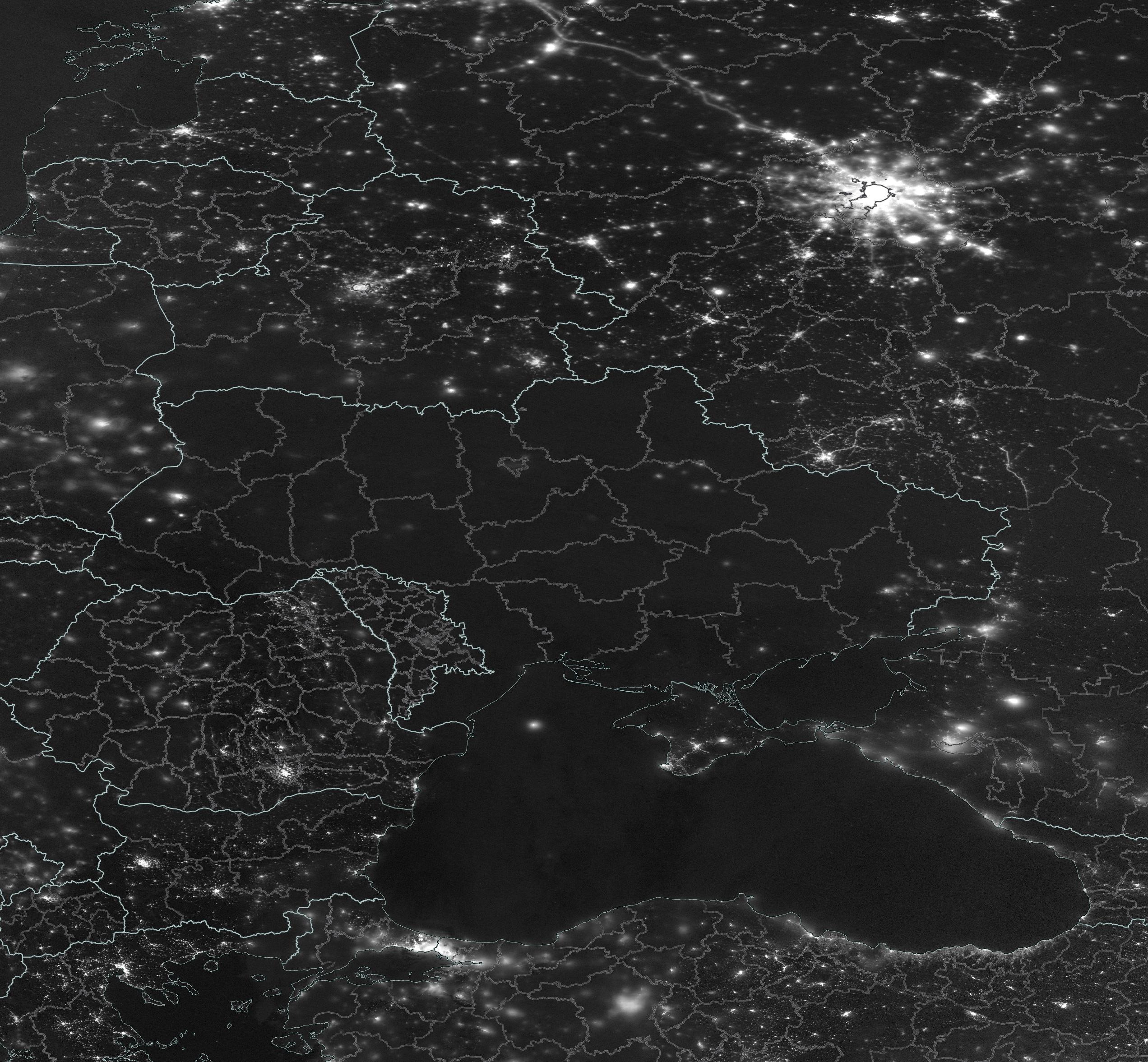
Satellite nighttime sensor view of Ukraine and surroundings on the night of 24 November 2022, showing the electricity outage

On 23 November Ukrainian armed forces reported that around 51 of 70 Russian missiles were intercepted by air defences. Kyiv's mayor Vitali Klitschko said around 21 out of 31 missiles launched to Kyiv were shot down. Missiles targeted civilian energy infrastructure and also struck apartment blocks and hospitals, killing at least six people. One of the missiles struck a hospital maternity ward at Vilniansk, killing a newborn baby. The attacks on the power grid caused more than half of neighboring Moldova to lose power.

=== December 2022 ===
On 5 December Ukrainian prime minister Denys Shmyhal said Russian missiles attacked energy facilities in Kyiv, Vinnystia and Odesa regions, which cut off the water supply in Odesa. Mykolaiv suffered power outages affected the surrounding region. In Zaporizhzhia, a missile attack killed at least two people and wounded three others including a child.

On 10 December seven Ukrainian oblasts were attacked by Shahed kamikaze drones which damaged Odesa's electricity grid, leaving 1.5 million residents without electricity. Despite power restoration, around 300,000 people were without electricity.

On 16 December Russia launched more than 70 missiles targeting Ukrainian infrastructure. Three people were killed in Kryvyi Rih after one missile struck an apartment block. Ukraine's energy minister German Galushchenko said nine power plants had been attacked, causing energy shortages. The Kyiv metro was also shut down.

Around 2:00 am local time on 19 December, a wave of Russian self-detonating drones attacked critical infrastructure in Kyiv and other Ukrainian cities. Electricity grid operator Ukrenergo reported that despite most being shot down by anti-aircraft weapons, several energy facilities were hit.

On 29 December Ukrainian armed forces claimed 54 of 69 Russian missiles were intercepted, including 16 over Kyiv and 21 over Odesa. At least three civilians were wounded in Kyiv, and a civilian house was struck in Darnyts'kyi.

On 31 December Russia launched missile strikes on Ukraine which killed one and injured at least a dozen, including a foreign journalist. Ukrainian Army chief Valerii Zaluzhnyi said 12 of the 20 missiles were shot down by air defence and caused damage to a hotel and an isolated house in Kyiv. Ukrainian officials denounced the targeting of residential areas. The strikes had less impact on the national energy grid, yet 30% of Kyiv was without electricity.

=== January 2023 ===
On 1 January 2023 Russian missile and drone strikes damaged infrastructure in Sumy, Khmelnytskyi, Zaprorizhzhia and Kherson. At least two people were killed in the attacks.

On 14 January Russian missiles hit critical infrastructure in Kyiv but no casualties were reported. A second wave came hours later when two S-300 missiles struck critical energy infrastructure in Kharkiv.

In Dnipro a multi-storey residential building was struck by a KH-22 cruise missile, causing part of the building to collapse. The strike killed 46 people and wounded many others. The search and rescue operation was called off on 17 January.

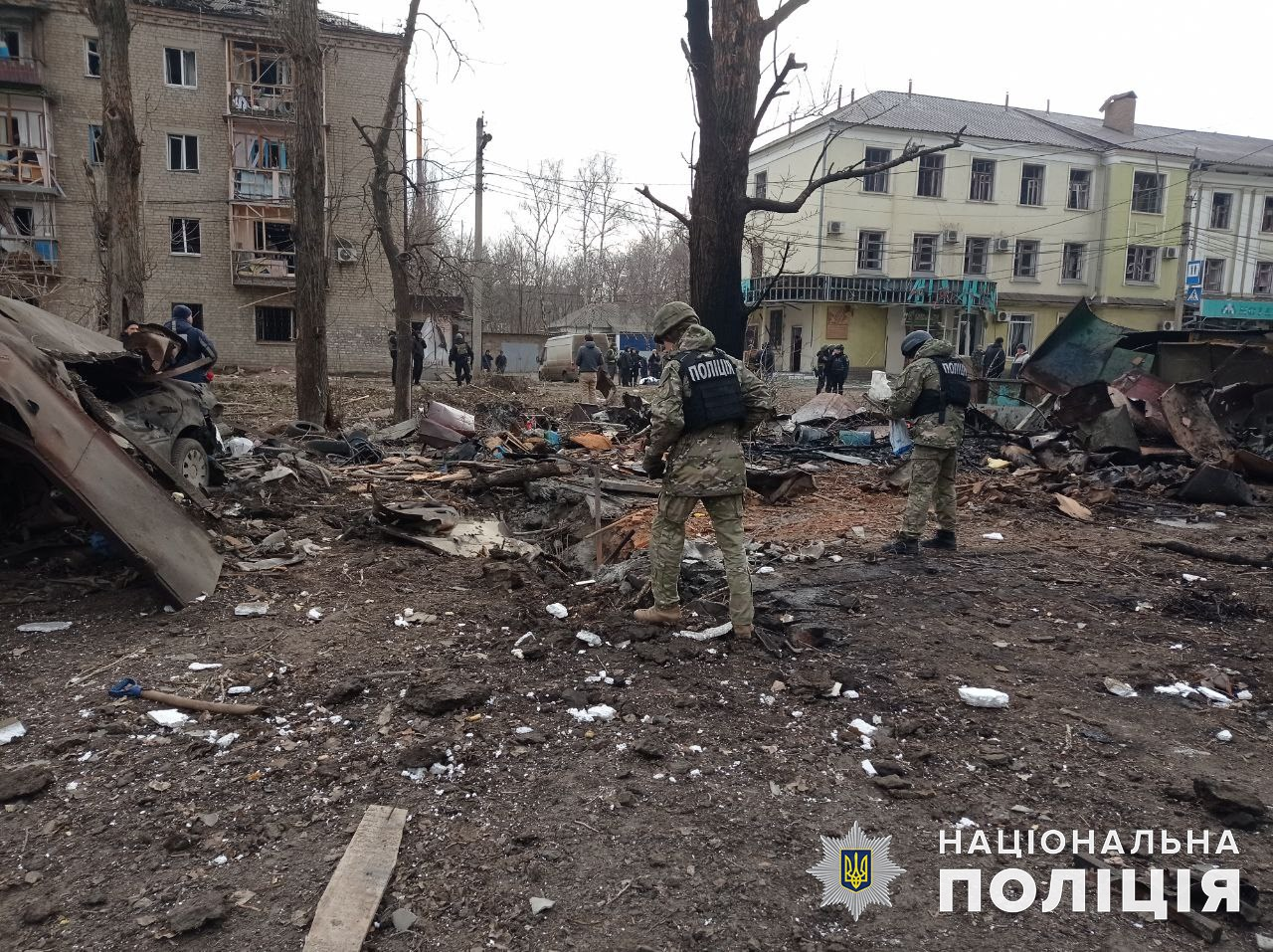
Aftermath of a Russian rocket attack in Kostiantynivka, 28 January 2023

On 26 January, a day after Ukraine secured agreement with the US and Germany to supply battle tanks, Russia launched an overnight drone attack followed by a number of missile strikes targeting infrastructure. Commander in chief, Valery Zaluzhny confirmed that a 55-year-old man had been killed and two wounded by a missile strike in Kyiv. He also said that 47 out of 55 missiles had been shot down. Ukrainian energy company DTEK announced that electrical substations underwent emergency shutdowns and critical energy infrastructure in Odesa and Vinnytsia regions were hit. Kyiv's Mayor Vitali Klitschko said that 11 people were killed and 35 buildings were damaged in 11 regions.

=== February 2023 ===
On 10 February Ukraine's air force commander said that 61 of the 71 Russian missiles launched were shot down, which included cruise, ballistic, and S-300 missiles. Ukrenergo said high-voltage facilities had been hit in all parts of Ukraine, causing disruption to power supplies. Mostly launched from the Black Sea, this attack was seen as a probing of Ukraine's southern air defenses in preparation for a future offensive.

On 11 February Russian forces launched another wave of suicide drones targeting Ukraine's energy infrastructure.

On 16 February the Ukrainian Armed Forces said that 41 Russian missiles were launched at Ukraine, of which 16 were shot down. The strikes involved Kh-22 anti-ship missiles that Ukraine cannot intercept, and some targets hit were in Lviv Oblast, and Pavlohrad.

=== March 2023 ===
On 9 March Russia attacked Ukraine with an estimated 81 missiles. The Ukrainian military said 34 missiles were shot down, a lower than usual rate due to Russia shifting to new technologies. Russia claimed it carried out a "massive retaliatory strike" as payback after an alleged raid in the Bryansk Oblast of Russia. Russia's attack included an unprecedented six Kinzhal hypersonic missiles. Kyiv, Odesa and Kharkiv regions were hit, leaving 40% of civilians in Kyiv without heat, and electricity outages in Odesa. At least five people were killed by the strikes in Zolochiv, Lviv region and one civilian was killed in Dnipro region. The attack again damaged electricity supplies to Zaporizhzhia Nuclear Power Plant, forcing it onto emergency diesel generators. Rafael Grossi, head of the IAEA said "Each time we are rolling a dice. And if we allow this to continue time after time then one day our luck will run out".

=== April 2023 ===
In early April 2023, following what was called the "titanic work" of engineers and partners in restoring power supplies, energy minister Herman Halushchenko announced the resumption of Ukraine's energy exports. Ukrenergo reported that every thermal and hydroelectric power station in Ukraine had been damaged by Russia's six-month campaign, with more than 1,200 missiles fired at its energy facilities.

According to a military spokesman, a power facility in Karlivka was damaged by Russian attacks on 22 April, cutting off water supply to 67 settlements in Donetsk Oblast.

On 28 April Russian cruise missiles killed at least 19 people. 23 missiles were launched during this attack and, according to the claims of Ukrainian officials, 21 were shot down by the Ukrainian military. One missile struck an apartment building in Uman, killing at least 17 people. Fragments from a shot down missile hit a suburban house in Dnipro, killing a mother and her three-year-old daughter.

The UK's Ministry of Defence released an intelligence update, saying the facilities damaged by these April Russian strikes "indicates a possible shift away from targeting Ukraine's electrical power network", instead focusing on Ukraine's military and logistics hubs.

=== May 2023 ===
May saw a Russian campaign of 20 deep combined attacks with missiles and drones during the month, unprecedented in scale and focussed on the city of Kyiv. The campaign was attributed to Russian willingness to distract Ukrainian forces from their expected counteroffensive and neutralizing Ukraine's improved air defences, but ISW assessed the Russian prioritization on Kyiv as limiting its ability to meaningfully constrain potential Ukrainian counteroffensive actions. The Kyiv Independent analyzed Ukrainian military data and counted 560 missiles and drones that cost the Russian government an estimated $1.7 billion, with nearly 90 percent destroyed by Ukrainian air defence.

On 1 May, according to Ukrainian claims, 15 out of 18 cruise missiles in a Russian attack were intercepted by Ukrainian air defences. The attack injured 34 civilians. Russian officials claimed it damaged railway infrastructure and an ammunition depot which was seemingly confirmed with social media videos of a blaze in Pavlograd. Mykola Lukashuk, the head of the Dnipro regional council claimed that an industrial zone, 19 apartment buildings and 25 homes were damaged or destroyed during the attack.

On 13 May the city of Khmelnytskyi in Western Ukraine was hit, creating a large explosion. Russia claimed it hit an ammunition deport and a hangar while Ukraine confirmed the targets were "critical infrastructure". The attack resulted in 21 injuries, as well as damage to civilian houses, schools, hospitals, cultural institutions, administrative buildings and industrial facilities. On 13 May warehouses were damaged and two people injured in Ternopil from a Russian missile attack. Ternopi was the hometown of Ukrainian electronic music duo Tvorchi, and was struck before and during their Eurovision Song Contest 2023 performance.

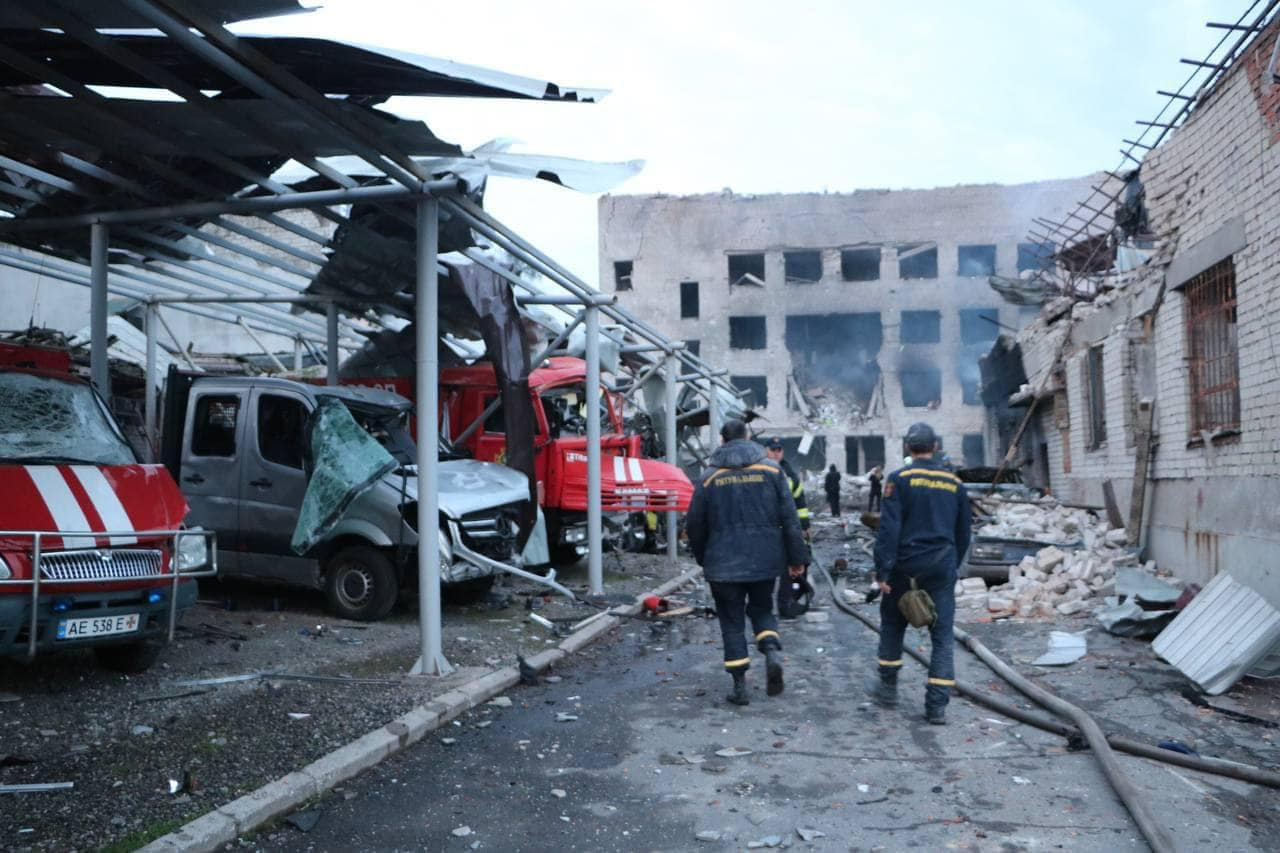
Fire department in Dnipro after Russian shelling on 22 May 2023

On 16 May, Ukraine claimed that six Kinzhal hypersonic missiles were intercepted by the Ukrainian military. In addition, Valerii Zaluzhnyi claimed Ukraine had shot down nine Kalibr cruise missiles from ships in the Black Sea and three Iskanders fired from land. Russia claimed the attack destroyed a Patriot air defense system in Kyiv, however, a United States official says that the system was likely damaged but not destroyed.

On 25 May missile and drone strikes targeted Kyiv, Dnipro, and Kharkiv. Ukrainian authorities claimed to have shot down 17 missiles and 31 drones launched by Russia. A missile strike on a medical clinic in Dnipro killed at least 2 people and injured at least 30, including two boys aged three and six. Additionally, an oil depot in Kharkiv was hit twice and fragments from an intercepted drone in Kyiv damaged a house and several cars. Ukraine claimed to have destroyed 10 of the 17 missiles that were launched, and 23 of 31 attack drones.

Russian forces also struck the floodgates of a hydroelectric dam in Donetsk Oblast using an S-300 antiaircraft missile in the Battle of Karlivka on 25 May, threatening the villages of Halytsynivka, Zhelanne-1, and Zhelanne-2 on the Vovcha River, flooding six homes, and leading to 26 evacuations. The governor of Donetsk Oblast said the dam had been constantly shelled since the beginning of the invasion.

On early 28 May Ukrainian officials claimed that 58 of 59 Shahed 136 drones were downed by Ukraine, most of them above Kyiv. These drones came from the Southern occupied territories to then spread across Ukraine while flying low to escape radars until they reach their destinations.

On 30 May Vladimir Putin claimed that the headquarters of the Ukrainian Main Directorate of Intelligence (GUR) in Kyiv had been destroyed in a Russian air strike.

=== June 2023 ===
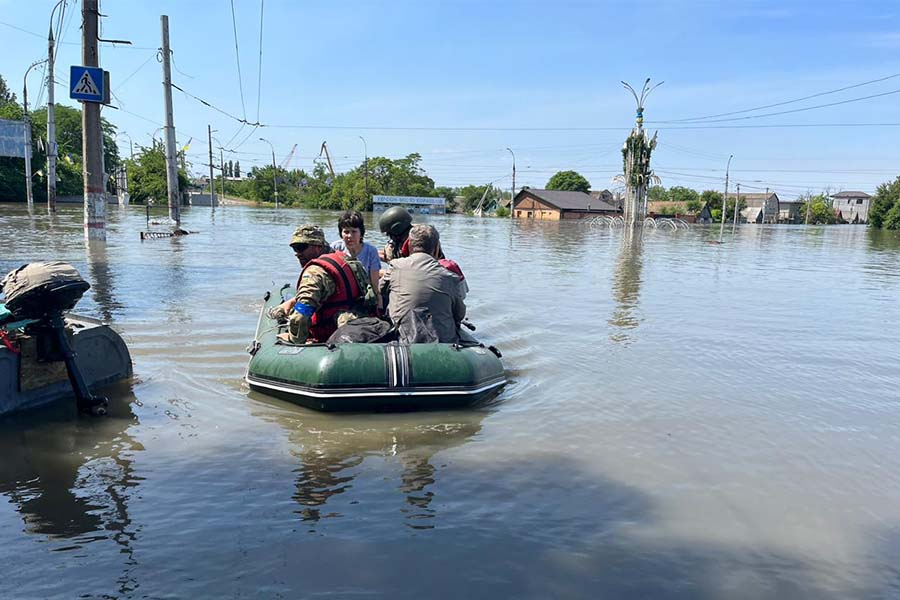
Flooding in Kherson a day after the destruction of the Kakhovka dam

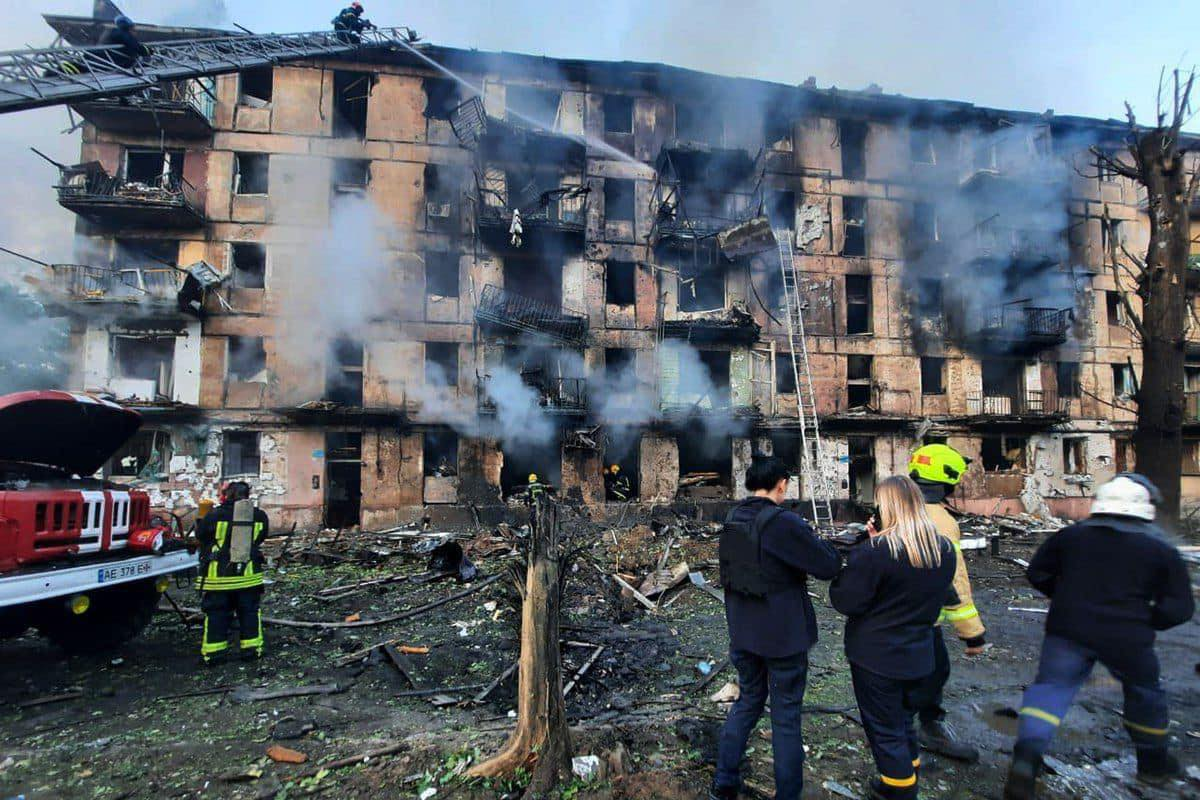
Residential building in Kryvyi Rih after Russian rocket attack in the night on 13 June 2023

On 6 June 2023 the Kakhovka Dam, a major water-control structure and hydroelectric power plant in southern Ukraine was destroyed. The failure caused catastrophic flooding affecting downstream settlements, enormous ecological damage, and started draining the Kakhovske Reservoir (which held 18 cubic kilometres of water), potentially cutting off water supply for hundreds of thousands and irrigation for large tracts of productive agricultural land, and increasing risk to the already threatened Zaporizhzhia Nuclear Power Plant. While Ukraine conducted rescue of people in flooded territory on the right bank of the Dnipro Russian forces shelled them, and Russian occupation authorities on the left bank prevented people from leaving the devastated regions.

The Kakhovka dam had been under control of Russian occupation forces since March 2022. Experts said the dam was probably destroyed by an internal explosion, and evidence points to an explosion at the time of the dam's failure. Russian forces are accused of blowing up the dam to hinder the Ukrainian counter-offensive, which Russian authorities denied.

On 11 June a military spokesman said that Russia had blown up a dam that Russia had occupied since February 2022, causing flooding to slow the Ukrainian advance near Novodarivka on the Mokri Yaly River in Zaporizhzhia Oblast, on territory.

South African President Cyril Ramaphosa announced that the leaders of African countries came up with a new initiative for peace in Ukraine. In June, a delegation from Africa, including representatives from South Africa, Egypt, Senegal, Congo-Brazzaville, Comoros, Zambia, and Uganda, visited Ukraine and Russia. They were in Kyiv during Russia's missile attack on the city.

In the early hours of 20 June 35 Iranian Shahed drones were launched by Russia mostly on Kyiv but also on Lviv. 32 were shot down. The remaining struck some critical infrastructure.

=== July 2023 ===
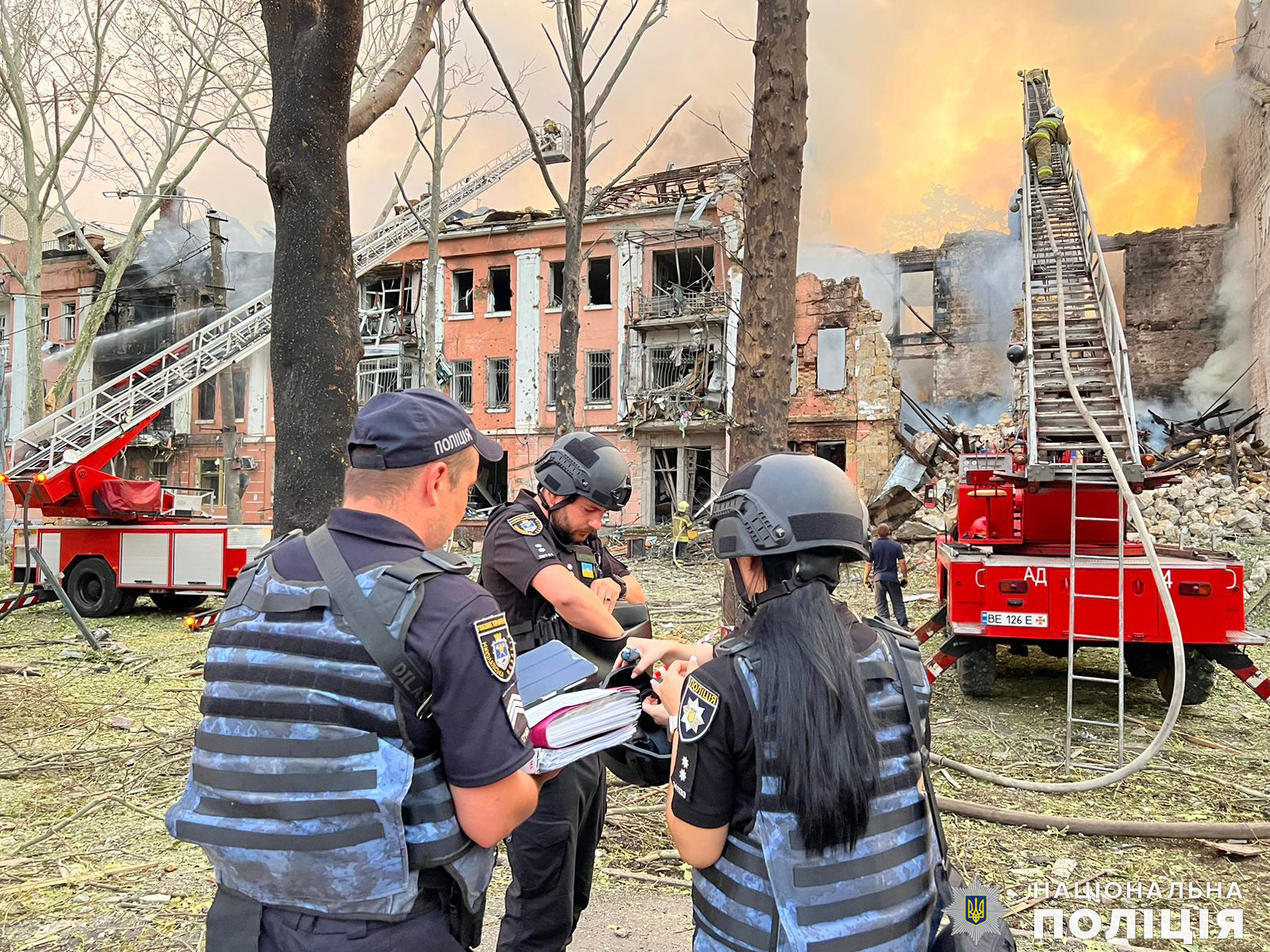
Following Russia's withdrawal from the grain deal, Russia launched a series of attacks on Mykolaiv and other port cities in Ukraine.

On 17 July 2023 Vladimir Putin announced that Russia had withdrew from a deal that allowed Ukraine to export grain across the Black Sea despite a wartime blockade. Following the withdrawal from the grain deal, Russia launched a series of attacks on the Ukrainian port cities of Odesa, Mykolaiv and Chornomorsk. Russia's Defense Ministry said the strikes were in retaliation for the 2023 Crimean Bridge explosion, but Ukraine said Russia was attacking civilian infrastructure linked to grain exports.

On 20 July 2023 the Chinese general consulate in Odesa was damaged in a Russian attack on a grain terminal in a nearby port, plus other parts of the city. China has been the largest importer of grains from Ukraine.

=== September 2023 ===
On the morning of 21 September, Russia launched a mass wave attack across several regions of Ukraine, killing 2 and injuring at least 26, and hitting a residential building, hotel, warehouses, a dormitory, and fuel and service stations. Ukraine's electricity grid operator Ukrenergo said the morning's Russian bombardment was the first major enemy attack on power infrastructure in six months and caused "partial blackouts in Rivne, Zhytomyr, Kyiv, Dnipropetrovsk, and Kharkiv regions".

=== October 2023 ===
On 21 October, a Russian S-300 missile strike struck a post office in Novyi Korotych, Kharkiv Oblast, Ukraine, during the Russian invasion of Ukraine. 8 people were killed and 15 further were injured, all of them post office employees. The airstrike was launched from Belgorod Oblast, Russia.

=== December 2023 ===
According to the Ukrainian military, Russia used 158 missiles and drones to launch the "largest strike since the beginning of the full-scale invasion" on Ukraine on 29 December 2023. At least 26 people were killed and 120 injured.

=== January 2024 ===
2 January 2024 Russian strikes on Ukraine
- Part of the Russian invasion of Ukraine and Russo-Ukrainian War
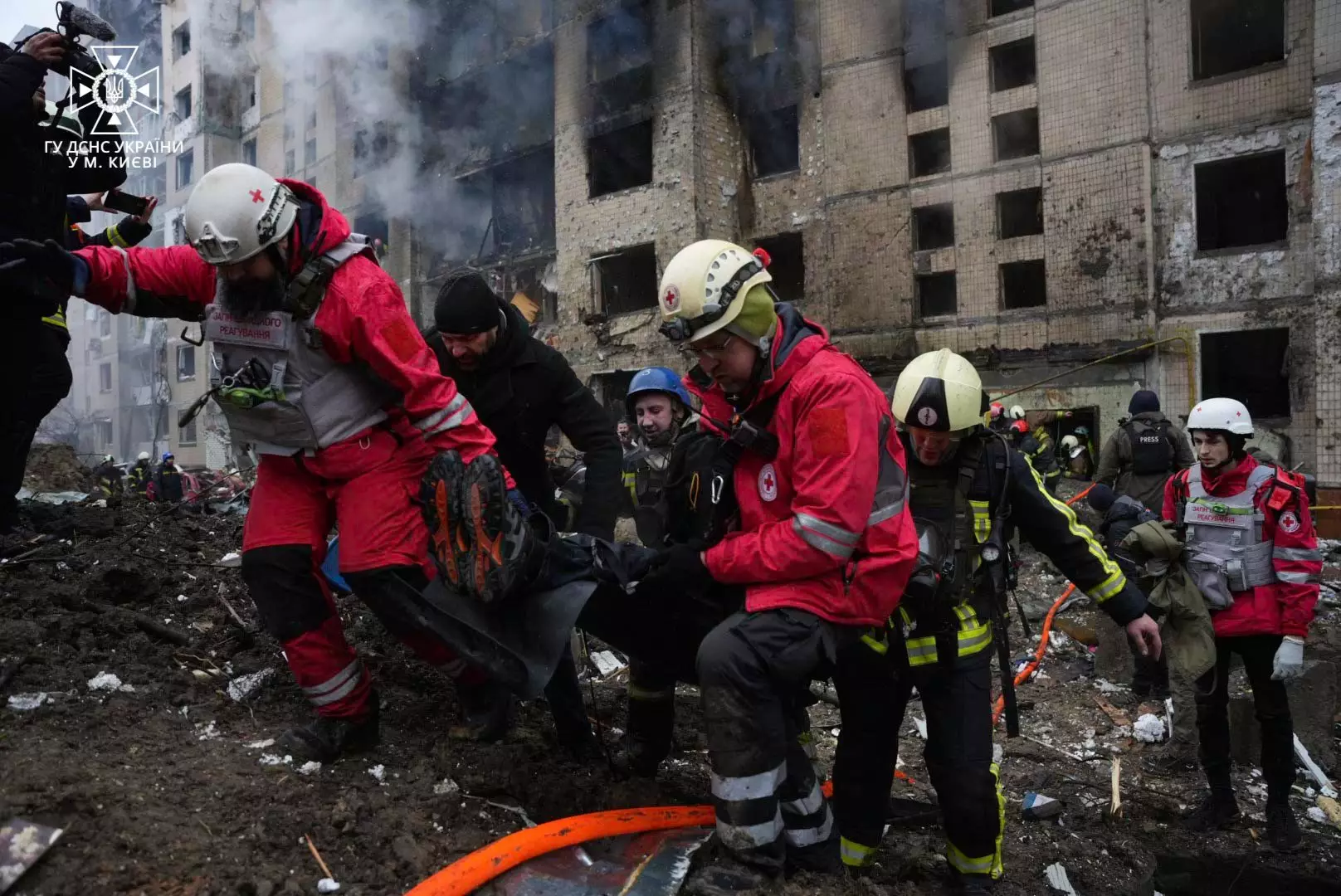
- Damaged residential building in Kyiv
- Location: Regions across Ukraine
- Date: 2 January 2024; Early morning
- Attack type: Airstrikes
- Deaths: 6
- Injuries: 119
- Perpetrator: Russian Armed Forces

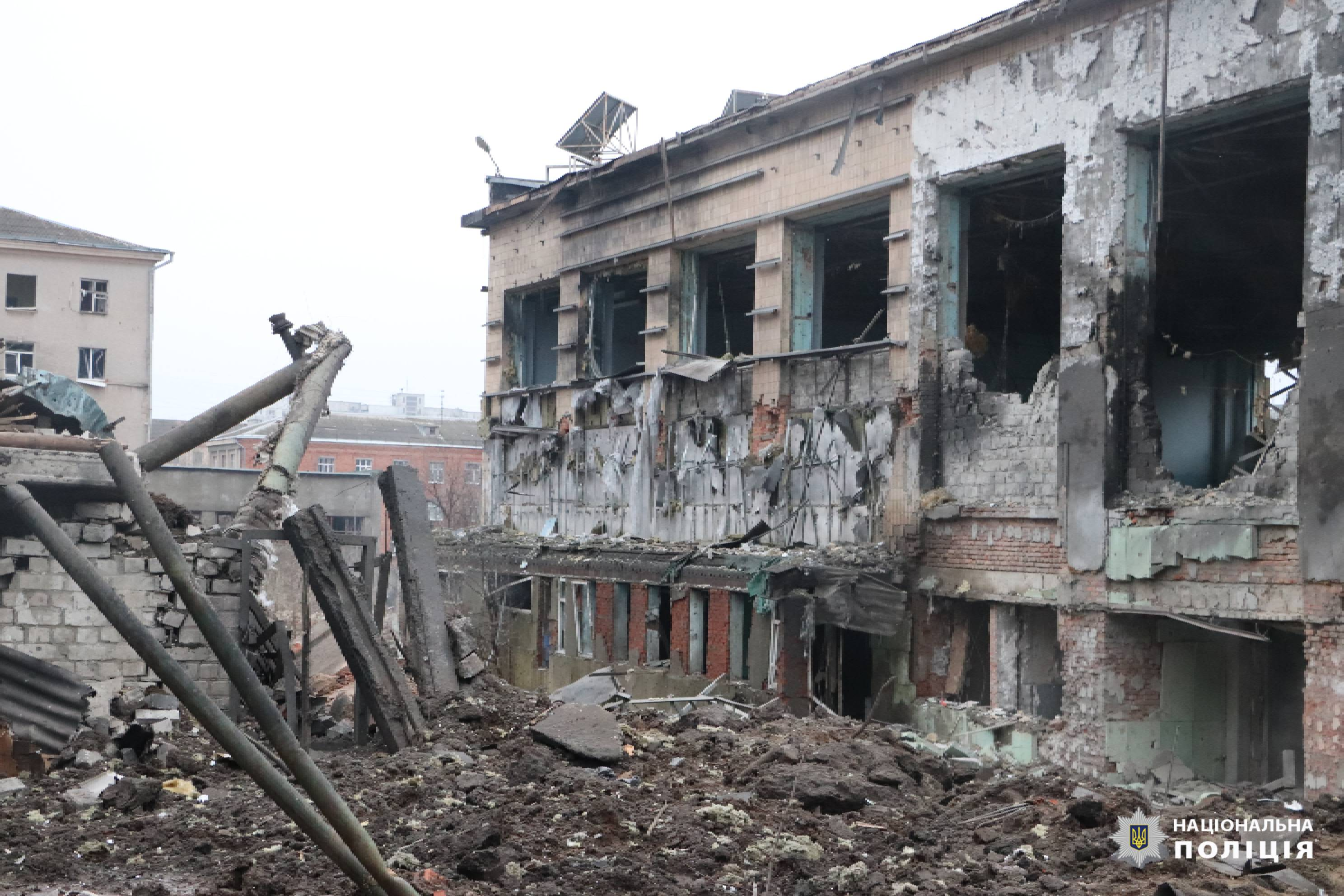
Destructions in Kharkiv

On 2 January, in a more targeted attack than 4 days prior, and of a similarly large magnitude of ranged weapons, preliminarily 5 people were killed and 119 injured in Kyiv and Kharkiv. Russian Forces let fly an early morning first wave of 35 Shahed-136/131 drones and then a second wave of 99 missiles, including 70 Kh-101/Kh-555/Kh-55 cruise missiles, 12 Iskander-M, S-300, or S-400 missiles, 10 Kh-47M2 Kinzhal ballistic missiles, and 4 Kh-31P anti-radar missiles. According to the Ukrainian military, out of the 99 missiles fired, 72 of them were intercepted, as well as all 35 Shahed-136/131 drones.

Russia attacked the Ukrainian cities of Kyiv and Kharkiv en masse. During the bombing, due to a mistake, a bomb was also dropped on the village of Petropavlovka in Voronezh Oblast, Russia.

In Kyiv, 50 people were injured and three were killed following the attacks. Over 250,000 people lost access to electricity.

Ihor Terekhov, the mayor of Kharkiv, reported several strikes at civilian houses. Three people died while 62 were injured.

Ukrainian missile interception claims and summary of damages for the 2 January attacks:

Region	City	Weapon	Intercepted/Total	Strikes, Killed/Wounded
Kharkiv Oblast	Kharkiv	С-300/С-400	0/2	Shelling of residential infrastructure
Kyiv and Kyiv Oblast		(Russia) Kh-101/X-101	59/70	Strikes and damage by fragments of residential and other buildings, victims: 3/100+
Kyiv and Kyiv Oblast		(Russia) Kh-47M2 Kinzhal	10/10	Strikes and damage by fragments of residential and other buildings, victims: 3/100+
Kyiv and Kyiv Oblast		(Russia) Kalibr	3/3	Strikes and damage by fragments of residential and other buildings, victims: 3/100+
Kharkiv Oblast	Kharkiv	(North Korea) Hwasong-11A (KN-23)	?/?	US officials claimed use of North Korean Hwasong-11A (KN-23) missiles during the shelling of Kharkiv on 2 January 2024.
Ukraine overall (excluding S-300 systems)			72/85+	Victims: 6/119+
Claimed total interception rate:			87 %	

=== March 2024 ===
On 22 March, Russia launched a massive missile and drone attack on Ukraine, leaving more than a million Ukrainians without electricity. Russian missiles struck the Dnipro Dam in Zaporizhzhia. In Kharkiv Oblast, the Kharkiv TEC-5 which was also previously struck in September 2022, and the Zmiivska thermal power plant were also severely damaged by Russia missile strikes.

=== April 2024 ===
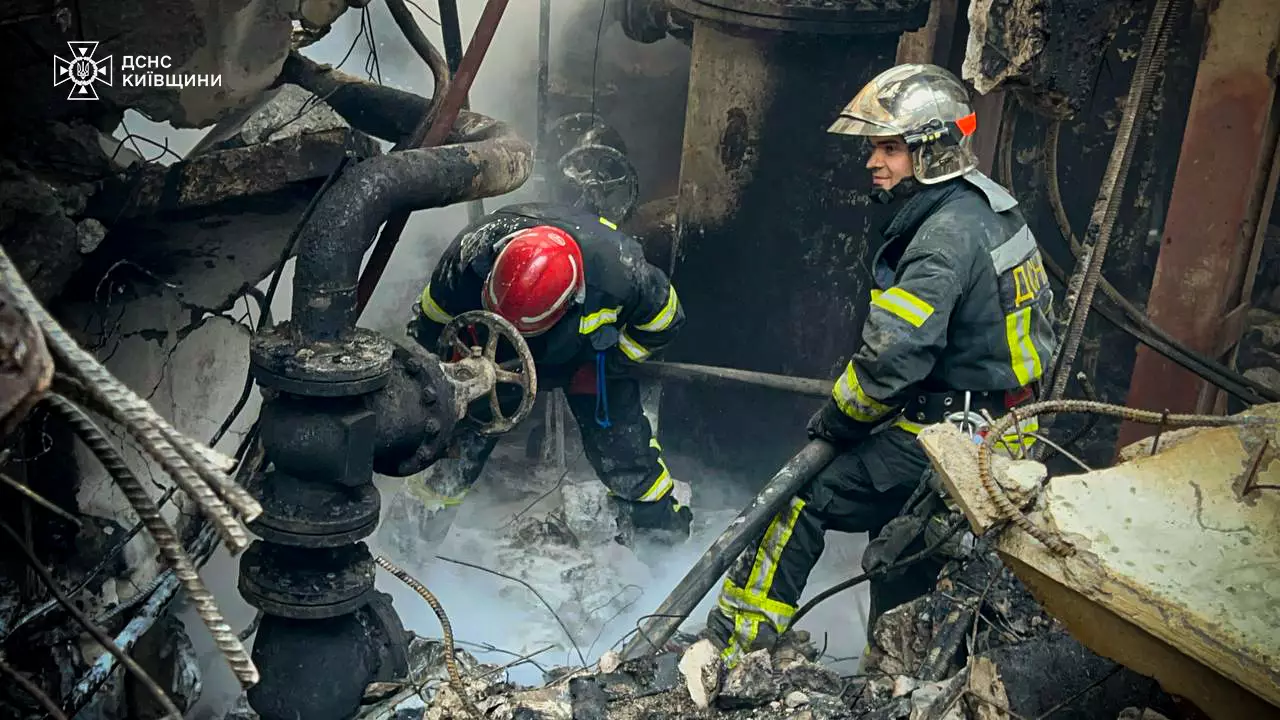
Liquidation of consequences of Russian missile strike on Trypilska thermal power plant on 11 April 2024

On 11 April, Russian strikes destroyed the Trypilska thermal power plant in Kyiv Oblast in an overnight attack.

=== June–August 2024 ===
According to the Royal United Services Institute (RUSI), "Russia’s strikes against Ukraine’s energy infrastructure have grown in efficacy, and are now in danger of achieving the Kremlin’s goal of a total blackout in Ukraine. ... Russian strikes had cumulatively destroyed 9 gigawatts (GW) of Ukraine’s domestic power generation by mid-June 2024. Peak consumption during the winter of 2023 was 18 GW, which means that half of Ukraine’s production capacity has been destroyed."

On 10 August, an unspecified "critical infrastructure facility" in Kramatorsk was damaged by a Russian missile strike, killing one worker and injuring several others.

In August 2024, Ukrainian official told The Washington Post: "Everything has to be weighed — our potential and the possible damage to our economy versus how much more damage could we cause them and their economy. But energy is definitely critical for us. We sometimes forget about the economy here, but we’re facing free fall if there’s no light and heat in the winter."

==== 26–27 August ====
On the morning of 26 August 2024, Russia carried out its largest series of missile and drone attacks against Ukraine during the Russian invasion of Ukraine, targeting multiple large and important cities including Kyiv, Kharkiv, Dnipro, Odesa, Kremenchuk, Zaporizhzhia, Vinnytsia, Kropyvnytskyi, Khmelnytskyi, Stryi, and Kryvyi Rih. The attacks resumed on the night of 26 August and into the morning of 27 August. Nationwide air raid sirens began to sound just prior to 6 a.m. local time on 26 August. Reports from the Ukrainian Air Force stated that multiple Russian MiG-31 aircraft capable of deploying Kinzhal ballistic missiles in addition to at least eleven Tu-95 bombers, multiple kamikaze drones, and multiple missiles were detected in and around Ukrainian airspace targeting numerous Ukrainian cities across the nation. President of Ukraine Volodomyr Zelenskyy reported that over 100 drones and over 100 missiles were used in the attacks. The Ukrainian State Emergency reported that seven people were killed in the attacks and 47 more were injured, including four children, of which the youngest injury was less than a year old. The Ukrainian Air Force stated that it detected 127 missiles and 109 drones launched by Russia, and that of these, air defense systems were able to intercept 102 missiles and 99 drones. During the attacks, Ukraine used its F-16s for the first time to intercept cruise missiles. However, the Ukrainian Air Force subsequently announced the loss of an F-16 and its pilot during the attacks.

Mayor of Kyiv Vitali Klitschko reported that "several districts" suffered from power outages following the first strikes, which was followed by water supply issues on the city's right bank. Kyiv Regional Military Administration head Ruslan Kravchenko stated several infrastructure establishments were struck and damaged from the strikes, and that Kyiv authorities were creating station locations called "points of invincibility" to grant residents without power internet access and phone charging. Videos and images spread on social media platforms showed heavily crowded subway stations from Ukrainian residents taking shelter from ongoing Russian attacks.

In Kyiv Oblast, residential houses were struck, causing one injury, as well as the Kyiv Hydroelectric Power Plant, damaging a dam and energy facility. One person was killed in Izium Raion. One person was killed and six others were injured in a missile strike on a bus stop in Bohodukhiv. Governor of Dnipropetrovsk Oblast Serhiy Lysak reported that a 69-year-old man was killed in Russian attacks in the region, and that evening a Russian missile struck a hotel in Kryvyi Rih, killing four people and injuring five others. A Russian strike hit an energy infrastructure facility in Poltava Oblast, causing five casualties, three of whom later died in hospital. Twelve communities in Sumy Oblast were targeted by Russian weapons, with 83 separate attacks taking place in the region consisting of 212 separate explosions and resulting in at least sixteen injuries. In Lutsk, at least one person was killed and an apartment building suffered damage from Russian attacks according to city mayor Ihor Polishchuk. Governor of Zaporizhzhia Oblast Ivan Fedorov reported that a man was killed in the region after Russian forces struck a private residence.

The Russian Ministry of Defense stated that it had used "high precision weapons" in order to severely damage critical Ukrainian energy infrastructure due to it supporting Ukraine's military–industrial complex. The ministry stated that the attacks successfully struck “all designated targets”, which included weapon storages, power substations, and gas compressor stations. Following a meeting with Ukrainian Interior Minister Ihor Klymenko, Minister of Energy German Galushchenko, head of Ukrainian electric grid operator Ukrenergo Volodymyr Kudrytskyi, and Ukrainian Air Force Commander Mykola Oleshchuk, Zelenskyy reported that Ukraine was preparing to retaliate against Russia. Prime Minister of Ukraine Denys Shmyhal repeated prior calls for the United States and European nations to allow Ukraine to use their weapons to strike long-range targets in Russia, He elaborated that: "In order to stop the barbaric shelling of Ukrainian cities, it is necessary to destroy the place from which the Russian missiles are launched." Ukrainian officials announced that they would meet in Washington D.C. to show the United States administration a list of potential Russian "high-value targets" that the Armed Forces of Ukraine could strike with long-range weaponry. Polish military authorities reported that an unidentified flying object appearing to be a Russian drone likely flew into Polish airspace during Russian attacks near Ukraine's western border. The Polish Armed Forces alerted Polish residents that multiple Polish and other allied aircraft took off and were flying in southeastern Poland.

=== November 2024 ===
On 17 November 2024, Russia launched a massive wave of air attack against Ukraine. Ukraine claimed that Russia launched more than 120 missiles and 90 drones during the attack, of which 102 missiles and 42 drones were intercepted. A residential building in Sumy was struck by a Russian missile later that day, killing 11 and injuring at least 89 people.

=== June 2025 ===
In June 2025 United Nations noted that Russian attacks on infrastructure in the first five months of 2025 led to 50% higher number of civilian casualties than in the same period year before. Russian attacks in April resulted in 1389 casualties (221 killed, 1168 injured) and 1019 in May (183 killed, 836 injured).

=== July 2025 ===
As of 1 July 2025, Ukrainian electrical output has returned to autumn 2022 levels, before the Russian systematic attack on the Ukrainian electric grid started. Ukraine has had an increase by 150% the power it’s exporting. Currently, Ukraine is exporting electricity to the EU, with Hungary being the biggest customer.

The Russian airstrikes that targeted the Kyiv metropolitan area (KMA) overnight on 16/17 June 2025 was the most deadly attack on Ukraine's capital in almost a year. The 3/4 July 2025 airstrikes targeting Kyiv broke the daily record of Russian long-range drone launches into the territory of Ukraine since the beginning of invasion in 2022. The previous record-setting aerial attacks came just five days earlier, with 537 drones and missiles launched. A new record was set five days later on 8/9 July, with 728 drones targeting ten out of 23 oblasts overnight, including 50 drones and 5 missiles launched into Volyn Oblast and its administrative center Lutsk.

=== August 2025 ===
On 5 August, a series of Russian strikes targeting Ukraine's Zaporizhzhia, Kharkiv, Odesa, and Sumy Oblasts killed at least five people and injures 13 others. One person was killed in a strike targeting infrastructure in the city of Lozova in the Kharkiv region; infrastructure hit included high-rise buildings and a residential area.

=== September 2025 ===
Overnight into 7 September, Russia launched 810 drones, four ballistic missiles and nine cruise missiles at targets in Ukraine, making it the largest aerial attack in the war. Ukraine said its air defenses shot down all but 54 drones and nine missiles, which hit Kyiv, Kryvyi Rih, Dnipro, Kremenchuk, and Odesa. In Kyiv, the Cabinet of Ministers of Ukraine was hit for the first time, and five residential buildings were damaged. In Kremenchuk, a bridge over the Dnipro river was hit. In total four people were killed and 44 were injured across Ukraine, including a baby and young woman in Kyiv.

=== January 2026 ===
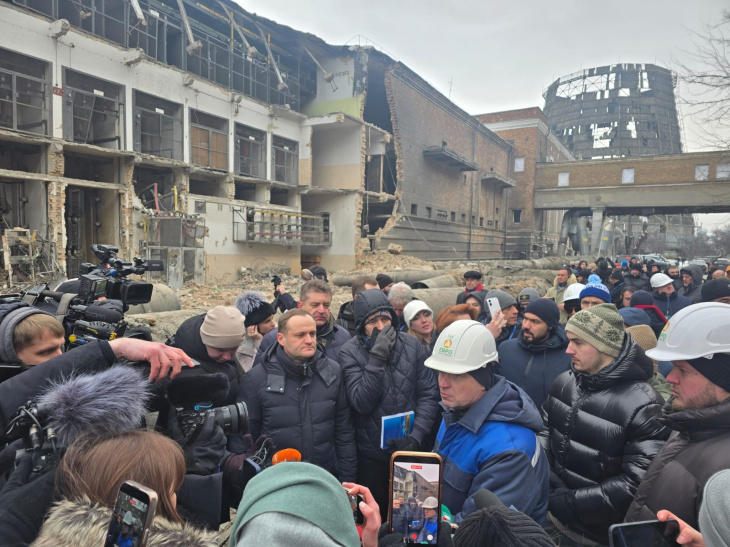
Damage to the Darnytsia Combined Heat and Power Plant (CHP) in Kyiv after a Russian missile strike on the night of 3 February 2026

Ukrainian Foreign Minister Andrii Sybiha claimed on 6 January that Russia was systematically attacking American businesses in Ukraine. He stated that approximately half of the members of the American Chamber of Commerce in Ukraine had seen damage or destruction to their facilities "on various scales."

=== May 2026 ===
In May 2026, Russian forces intensified large-scale combined daytime and nighttime drone and missile attacks against Ukrainian cities and infrastructure, particularly targeting Kyiv and other urban centres. Ukrainian officials reported that the strikes involved prolonged waves of daytime drones followed by nighttime missile attacks, a "double-tap" tactic intended to exhaust Ukrainian air defences and emergency response capabilities. Residential buildings, energy infrastructure, and civilian facilities were reported damaged in multiple regions.

== Spillover ==
=== Moldova ===
Nicu Popescu, Deputy Prime Minister of Moldova, announced that three Russian missiles launched on 10 October from the Black Sea aimed at Ukraine crossed through Moldovan airspace. He condemned this event in the "strongest possible terms" and called it a breach of international law. Popescu also added that the Russian ambassador to Moldova, Oleg Vasnetsov, had been summoned to provide explanations.

On 31 October a Russian missile, shot down by Ukrainian air defence systems, crashed into Naslavcea, a village in Moldova. No casualties were reported but windows of several residential houses were shattered. Moldovan authorities strongly condemned the renewed wave of attacks.

On 5 December, another missile fell into Moldovan territory. The Ministry of Internal Affairs of Moldova announced that it was found by the Moldovan Border Police in an orchard close to the city of Briceni. Due to this, patrolling intensified and the alert level was raised in the areas of Briceni and Ocnița. Military expert Alexei Leonkov said that like the missile that fell in Poland, this missile originating from a S-300 missile system.

On 14 January Moldovan border police found missile debris in Larga, Briceni District. Specialists carried out "controlled detonations" of the debris. Moldova also said that its airspace was crossed once more during the 14 January attacks.

On 10 February, Moldova reported that its airspace had again been violated by a Russian missile. On 16 February Moldovan police found missile debris in Larga once again. This was the fourth time a Russian missile or its debris had hit Moldova.

On 25 September, a missile crashed into Chițcani, for the first time in Moldovan territory controlled by Transnistria.

On 11 February 2024, fragments of a Russian drone were found in the village of Etulia. It was suspected to have crashed in Moldova after being shut down by Ukrainian air defense forces. A Russian attack with drones against Ukraine's Izmail Raion had taken place earlier on the night of 9 to 10 February. On 17 February, fragments of a Russian drone were again found in Etulia Nouă. This happened again on 4 April, when the wreckage of a Russian drone was found again near Etulia following a Russian attack against Ukraine with drones the previous night.

=== Poland ===
On 15 November a missile struck the territory of Poland at the village of Przewodów near the border with Ukraine, killing two civilians at a grain dryer. At least 50 missiles were in the air at the time. According to a spokesman for the Ukrainian Air Force, out of 20 Russian missiles, 15 were shot down and 5 hit their target. Ukraine fired two interceptor missiles at each incoming Russian missile. The spokesman, Yuriy Ignat, said during an interview: "so we can assume at least 30 missiles were launched from our side." This was the first time a missile hit NATO territory during the Russian invasion of Ukraine. The missile was determined to have likely been launched by Ukraine as part of their air-defense system in response to ongoing missile strikes, although an investigation by Poland and NATO is ongoing.

On 2 January 2024, Poland launched its F-16 tactical aviation to protect its airspace.

=== Romania ===
On 4 August 2023 Ukraine reported that Russian "Shaheed" drones directed at its Danube ports exploded on the territory on neighboring Romania. Romanian authorities declared that the incident did not "generate direct military threats to Romania's national territory or territorial waters". On 6 September Romanian government confirmed UAV remains found in on Danube coast. On 7 September NATO expressed its support for Romania and declared increased NATO presence in Black Sea area in response to Russian air attacks.

=== Belarus ===
Following the wave of missile strikes on 29 December 2022, it was reported that a Ukrainian S-300 air defence missile was shot down by Belarusian authorities after it strayed into Belarus. It crashed near the village of Harbacha. Both sides acknowledged the incident as an accident.

== Reactions ==
=== Western organizations ===
==== United Nations ====
UN Secretary General António Guterres was "deeply shocked" by the large-scale missile attacks, his spokesman said.

==== European Union ====
Ursula von der Leyen, the president of the European Commission, promised the European Union would stand alongside Ukraine for as "long as it takes", speaking in a video message alongside the Prime Minister of Estonia, Kaja Kallas, near the EU's eastern border with Russia. France's President Macron announced on 12 October that air defence systems would be delivered to Ukraine in the coming weeks because of the strikes. He said the war had entered "an unprecedented stage". Germany announced, 10 October it would speed up delivery of four of its IRIS-T SLM air defence system. The Netherlands Defence Minister, Kajsa Ollongren wrote in a letter to parliament 12 October, that the attacks "can only be met with unrelenting support for Ukraine and its people." She announced €15 million in air defence missiles for Ukraine in response to the Russian attacks.

Following a German initiative, 15 European countries announced on 13 October that they would jointly procure air defence systems to protect the continent under the new European Sky Shield Initiative.

Following further attacks on Ukrainian energy infrastructure 23 November, The European Parliament voted in favour of designating Russia a state sponsor of terrorism.

==== NATO ====
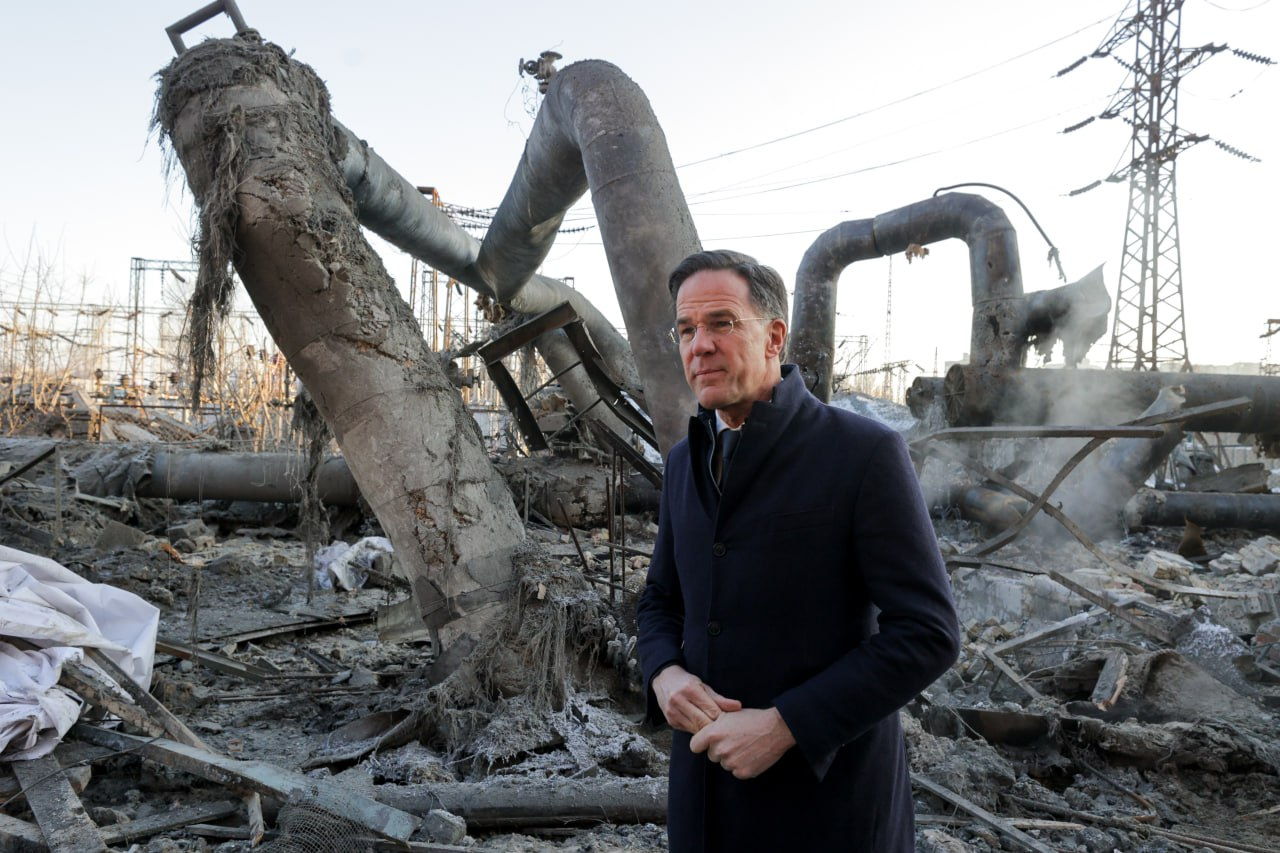
NATO Secretary General Mark Rutte inspects damage at the Darnytsia Combined Heat and Power Plant in Kyiv on 3 February 2026

The NATO Secretary General, Jens Stoltenberg, said on 28 November 2022 that "Putin [is trying to use] winter as a weapon of war". In September 2023 NATO declared increased presence in Black Sea due to Russian attacks against Ukraine violating air space of Romania.

=== Individual states ===
==== United States ====
The day after the strikes, President Joe Biden condemned the attacks and announced that Ukraine would be sent "advanced air defense systems". The US president had a phone call with the Ukrainian President Volodymyr Zelenskyy. President Biden "expressed his condemnation of Russia's missile strikes across Ukraine, including in Kyiv, and conveyed his condolences to the loved ones of those killed and injured in these senseless attacks. He pledged to continue providing Ukraine with the support needed to defend itself, including advanced air defense systems." The US Embassy urged its citizens to leave Ukraine due to shelling, which poses a direct threat to the civilian population and civilian infrastructure.

Three US officials speaking to media, 13 December, said plans were in their final stages to send Ukraine Patriot air defence systems. The system is the most advanced that the US has. Former Russian president Medvedev had made warnings about its potential deployment. The final decision to deploy the system was announced by the US administration on 20 December.

==== United Kingdom ====
Britain condemned the strikes: Defence Secretary Ben Wallace stated on 13 October that the UK would donate its advanced air defence system, AMRAAM which is capable of shooting down cruise missiles. He added that more aerial drones and a further 18 howitzer artillery guns would also be sent. The UK's Prime Minister, Rishi Sunak visited Kyiv on 19 November, announcing a further £50m package of defence aid including 125 anti-aircraft guns, radars and anti-drone technology. He also said he would be stepping up humanitarian aid. On 12 December, in the UK Parliament, former Prime Minister, Boris Johnson asked defence minister, Ben Wallace about supplying Ukraine with long range weapons. He replied mentioning Russia's breach of Geneva Conventions by targeting civilians, saying he would be "..open minded to see what we do next."

==== Ukraine ====
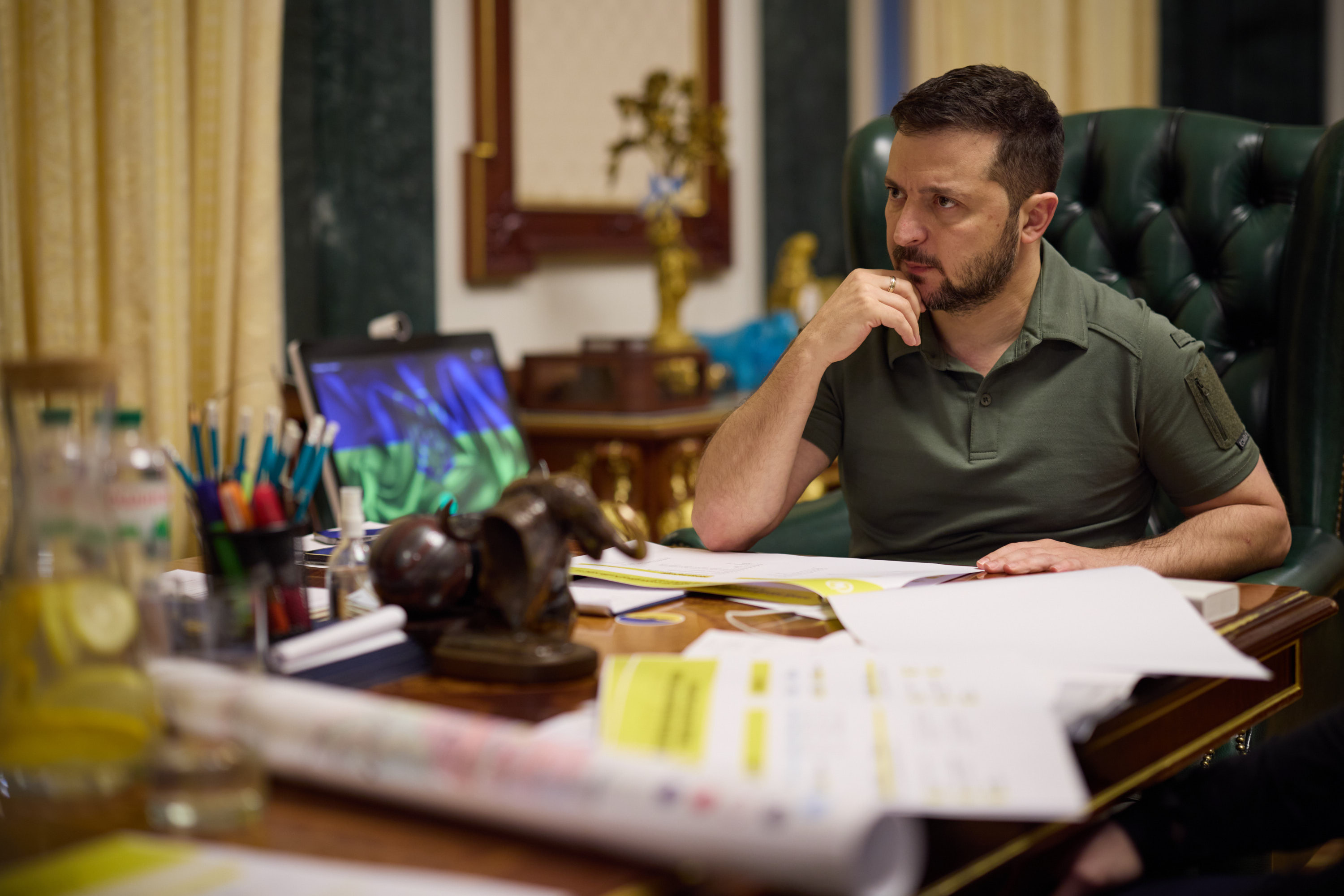
Volodymyr Zelenskyy

After a wave of Russia massive airstrikes on 10 October 2022, Ukrainian President Volodymyr Zelenskyy wrote on Telegram: "They are trying to destroy us and wipe us off the face of the earth. The air raid sirens do not subside throughout Ukraine. There are missiles hitting. Unfortunately, there are dead and wounded." The head of the Ministry of Foreign Affairs of Ukraine, Dmytro Kuleba, announced the immediate interruption of his African visits due to massive missile attacks that day. He said Vladimir Putin "is a terrorist who talks with missiles", whose "only tactic is terror on peaceful Ukrainian cities, but he will not break Ukraine down".

The Ministry of Education recommended that all schools be transferred to distance education by 14 October.

In a telephone conversation, Chancellor of Germany Olaf Scholz and Zelenskyy agreed to convene an emergency meeting of the G7.

Review shows more than 83 missiles and 17 Iranian-made Shahed UAVs, launched from the territory of Belarus, were involved in the strikes. Ukraine claimed that it had shot down 43 of the missiles, including a cruise missile that was shot down with MANPADS.

On 29 December 2022, following the strikes against Ukrainian infrastructure, Dmytro Kuleba tweeted, "There can be no 'neutrality' in the face of such mass war crimes. Pretending to be 'neutral' equals taking Russia's side."

On 4 January 2023 Vadym Skibitsky, deputy head of Ukraine's military intelligence, stated that Russia was struggling to replenish its stockpiles of missiles and only has enough for two to three major barrages of 80 missiles or more.

On 2 January 2024, President Volodymyr Zelenskyy expressed his condolences to all victims of the attack. He has also stressed that "the terrorist state must feel the consequences of its actions" Ambassador to Ukraine Bridget A. Brink commented "Putin is ringing in 2024 by launching missiles at Kyiv and around the country as millions of Ukrainians again take shelter in freezing temps. Loud explosions in Kyiv this morning. It's urgent and critical that we support Ukraine now – to stop Putin here." Minister of Foreign Affairs Jan Lipavský stated "Hypocritical Russia. It accuses others of genocide and is itself once again bombing civilian targets in Ukraine and murdering innocents. It wants us to be tired of war and give up on the Ukrainians. But that is not going to happen. Not this year, not ever."

On 17 August 2024, The Washington Post reported, citing anonymous diplomatic sources, that Ukraine's incursion into Kursk Oblast disrupted plans for indirect talks in Doha, Qatar to halt mutual strikes on energy infrastructure in Ukraine and Russia. Both Ukraine and Russia had reportedly planned to send their delegations to indirect talks mediated by Qatari officials, but Russian officials postponed the meeting in the wake of Ukraine's incursion. Ukrainian officials told The Washington Post that the indirect talks in Doha had been postponed "due to the situation in the Middle East", but later declined to comment.

==== Russia ====
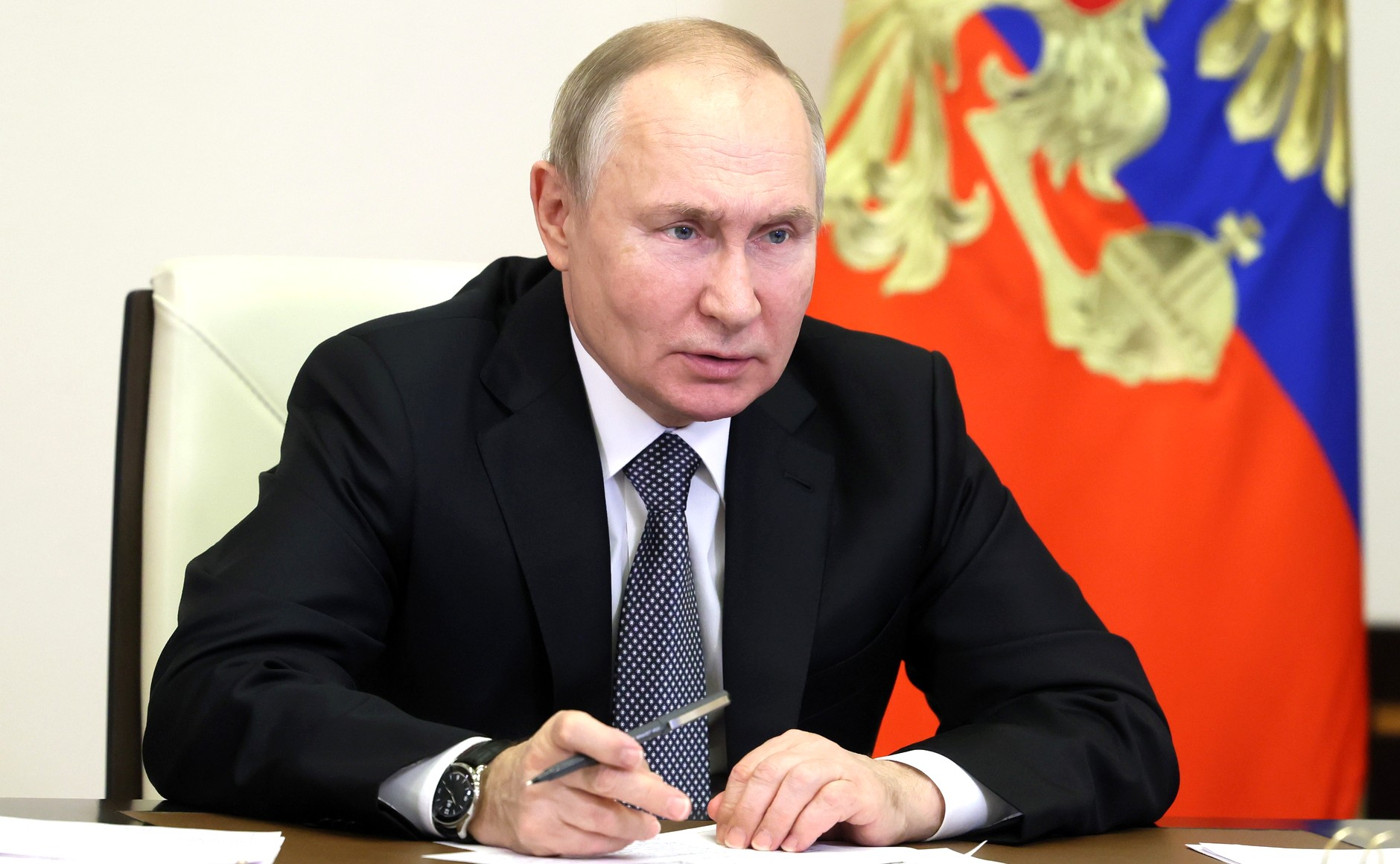
Putin claimed the attacks on Ukraine were in retaliation for Ukraine's attack on the Crimean Bridge, despite initiating mass strike before that date.

Russia's Ministry of Defence stated on 10 October that it was satisfied with the outcome of the strikes on Ukraine and claimed that all the targets, including military and energy objects, had been destroyed.

On 10 October Russian President Vladimir Putin said the missile strikes on Ukraine were in retaliation for the Ukrainian attack on the Crimean Bridge, which he called an act of "terrorism", adding that if such attacks continued, the response would be "severe". The "retaliation" narrative was once again repeated in July 2023 when Russian MoD justified mass-scale air strikes against Ukrainian sea ports and grain silos.

Russian propagandists and government officials, such as Margarita Simonyan, Tigran Keosayan, Vladimir Solovyov, Evgeniy Poddubny and Ramzan Kadyrov, welcomed the missile strikes on Ukraine, with some calling to target power stations before winter. Russian state-owned television channel Russia-1 spread false claims that the Ukrainian president, Volodymyr Zelenskyy, fled Ukraine following the missile strikes. Russian pundits have also falsely claimed that the photos and videos of victims injured by shards of glass of a bombed high-rise building were staged.

On 24 November 2022 Putin's spokesman Dmitry Peskov denied that the Russian military was attacking civilian infrastructure in Ukraine. According to Peskov, the Russian army only attacks targets that are directly or indirectly connected to military potential. In January 2023, the Russian Ministry of Defence confirmed their responsibility for the Dnipro residential building airstrike, which killed over 40 civilians. However, Peskov stated that Russian forces never attack residential buildings and that the residential building had probably collapsed because of a Ukrainian air defense counterattack. Dnipro mayor Borys Filatov said that the Russians might have intended to target a nearby thermal power station.

During a meeting of the UN Security Council on 24 November 2022, Russia's Permanent Representative to the UN Vasily Nebenzya explained the purpose of Russian strikes against Ukrainian infrastructure, saying: "We're carrying out attacks on infrastructure facilities in Ukraine in response to the country being loaded with Western weapons and unwise calls for Kyiv to wield a military victory over Russia." He claimed that "Ukraine's air defence is to blame for residential houses getting damaged and civilians getting killed in Ukraine." In December 2022 however mass-scale attacks against Ukrainian "energy infrastructure", "combined heat and power plants" and "electrical substations" was openly described in Russian media as intended to "force adequate behavior" of Ukrainians, with quoted experts calling for increased "systematic destruction of Ukrainian infrastructure". In of August 2023 Russian state-controlled media also openly reported that Ukrainian port infrastructure, grain silos and hotels were targeted by Russian rockets.

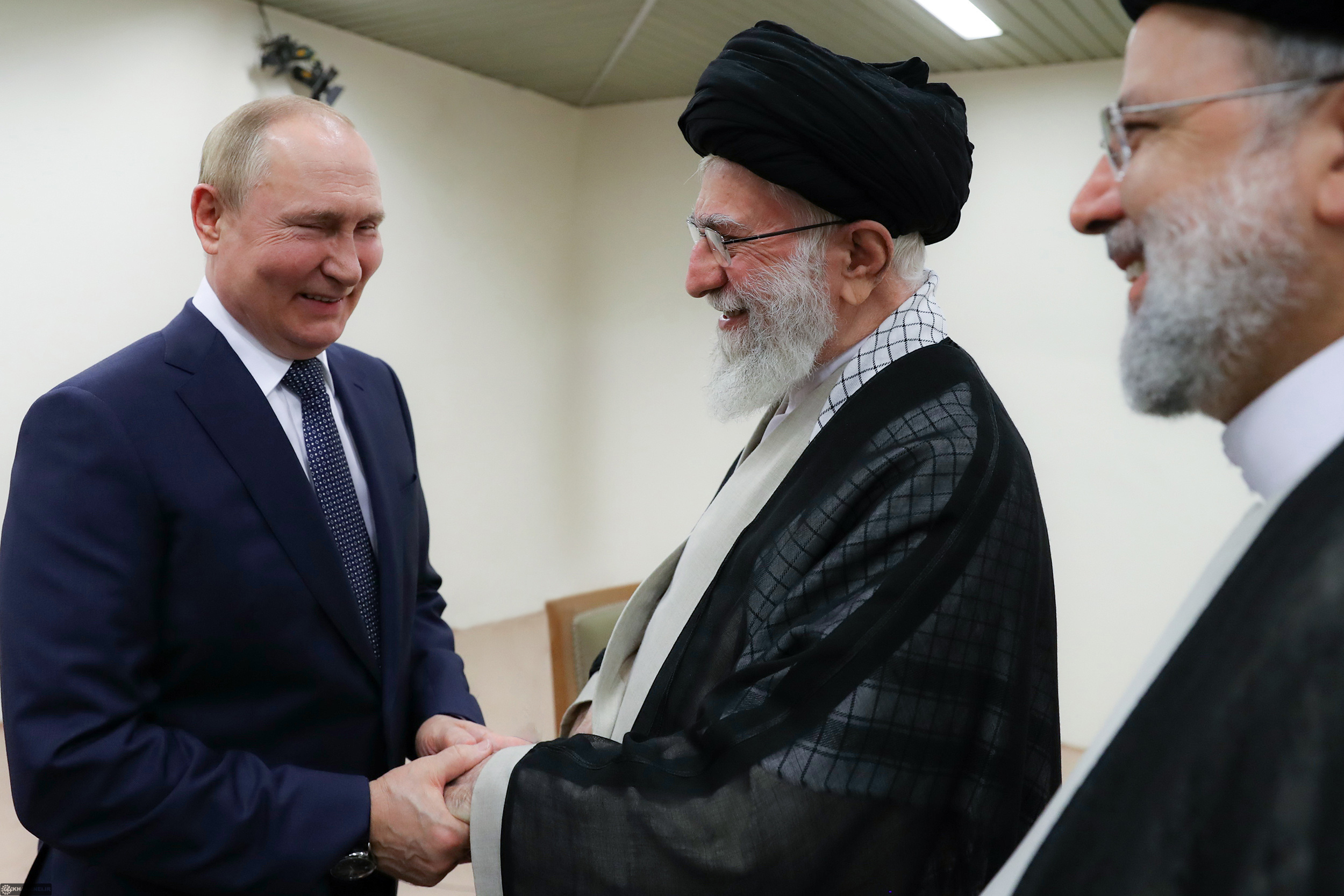
Putin with Ayatollah Ali Khamenei and Iranian President Ebrahim Raisi in Tehran. Iran has supplied Russia with up to 3,000 attack drones.

On 7 March 2023 Dmitry Ivanov, a mathematics student at Moscow State University, was sentenced to eight-and-a-half years in prison under Russia's 2022 war censorship laws for posting on Telegram about Russian strikes against Ukrainian infrastructure.

On 30 May 2023 Putin claimed that Russia only bombed "with high-accuracy long-range weapons and targets precisely military infrastructure facilities, or warehouses with ammunition or fuel and lubricants used in combat operations."

On 18 August 2024, following a report in The Washington Post that Ukraine's incursion into the Kursk Oblast disrupted plans for indirect talks in Doha, Qatar to stop mutual strikes on energy infrastructure in Ukraine and Russia, Russian foreign ministry spokesperson Maria Zakharova said that there were "no direct or indirect negotiations between Russia and Ukraine on the safety of civilian critical infrastructure facilities" and that after the assault on the Kursk Oblast, Putin ruled out the possibility of such talks. A Russian academic with close ties to senior Russian diplomats said that Putin probably lost interest in further talks in Qatar because the "Russian leadership usually does not make any compromises under pressure" and attacks on energy infrastructure are highly effective tactics that do more damage to Ukraine than to Russia, adding that Russia is more interested in talks with Ukraine about a broader ceasefire.

On 13 December 2024 Russian Ministry of Defense on its official Telegram profile openly admitted its "mass bombing" campaign of the preceding night "targeted critical objects of fuel and energy infrastructure of Ukraine" in response to Ukraine's previous attack on "military airport near Taganrog".

==== Others ====
- (Australia) On 11 October, crowds gathered in Melbourne, Sydney, Hobart, and the capital, Canberra, to rally in support of Ukraine following the strikes.
- (Moldova) President Maia Sandu condemned the attacks on 10 October, stating that "brutality, terror and killing of innocent civilians must immediately stop".
- (China) The Ministry of Foreign Affairs expressed "hope [that] the situation will de-escalate soon".
- (India) The Ministry of External Affairs issued a statement expressing deep concerns at "the latest escalation of conflict in Ukraine, including targeting of infrastructure and civilian deaths." They also called for an "immediate cessation of hostilities and urgent return to the path of diplomacy and dialogue."
- (Israel) Prime Minister Yair Lapid "strongly condemned" the Russian attacks on civilians.
- Foreign Minister Mevlüt Çavuşoğlu spoke over the phone with his Ukrainian counterpart Dmytro Kuleba. Çavuşoğlu strongly condemned the Russian strikes and affirmed that Turkey will continue its support for Ukraine. The ministers also coordinated efforts on mobilising a resolute response within the United Nations General Assembly.

== Remedial actions ==
=== United Nations ===
The UN launched an appeal through its Development Programme for the supply of power transformers, transformer substations, gas turbines and other critical items to Ukraine. The Office for the coordination of Humanitarian Affairs announced the roll out of a $1.7 billion programme for Ukrainians to buy food and other basics, saying it was the "largest cash assistance programme in history".

=== European Parliament ===
In addition to €1 billion humanitarian assistance package, the European Union's Civil Protection Mechanism provided 500 generators with 300 more funded by charities. Repair kits were also provided. On 23 November, as a joint initiative between the European Parliament and Eurocities, a campaign called "Generators of Hope" was launched. It called on 200 European cities to direct relief to Ukraine with the President of Eurocities and Mayor of Strasbourg, Dario Nardella saying "..We must act immediately. Winter is upon us [..] there is no time to waste".

=== Turkish floating powerships ===
Turkey's Karpowership company was reported, 29 November as being in talks with Ukraine to provide up to three floating power generators. The ships, if they were provided, could provide up to 300 megawatts, enough for 1 million homes. Volodymyr Kudrytskyi, CEO of Ukrenergo, said that Russian missile attacks had caused "colossal" destruction and that practically no power stations in Ukraine had been left untouched. For reasons to do with insurance in the war zone, discussions were ongoing 8 December with the UN and other aid agencies, to position the ships in Romania or Moldova. Power lines that interconnect the countries to Ukraine would be used to supply up to 400MW of electrical power. On 26 January 2023 Ukraine's JSC Energy Co. signed a Memorandum of Understanding with Karpowership to develop and finance the implementation of the project.

=== Light bulb appeal ===
The damage to Ukraine's energy infrastructure had caused a shortfall of approximately 2.5 gigawatts of power according to president Zelenskyy, speaking in Paris, 14 December. Electrical generators, he said, were now "as necessary [..] as armoured vehicles and bulletproof vests". The supply of 50 million LED lightbulbs to Ukraine would save around one gigawatt, reducing the shortfall by 40%. The European Union pledged to supply 30 million light bulbs.

=== Resilience improvements ===
Ukraine have been looking for alternatives to centralized gas and nuclear energies. Effort have been done toward wind energy since its decentralized nature makes it more resilient to Russian bombing.

In June 2023 Ukraine announced to be leading the largest upgrade and improvement of its energy infrastructure, to augment resilience to potential winter 2023-2024's strikes by Russia.

=== Funding ===
Two loans of €150 million were agreed by the European Bank for Reconstruction and Development to Ukrenergo for equipment and capital structure support. A further €70 million was provided in grant form by the Netherlands making a combined package of €370 million.

In mid-April the World Bank agreed to finance Ukrainian infrastructure reconstruction for $200 Million.

== International Criminal Court indictments ==
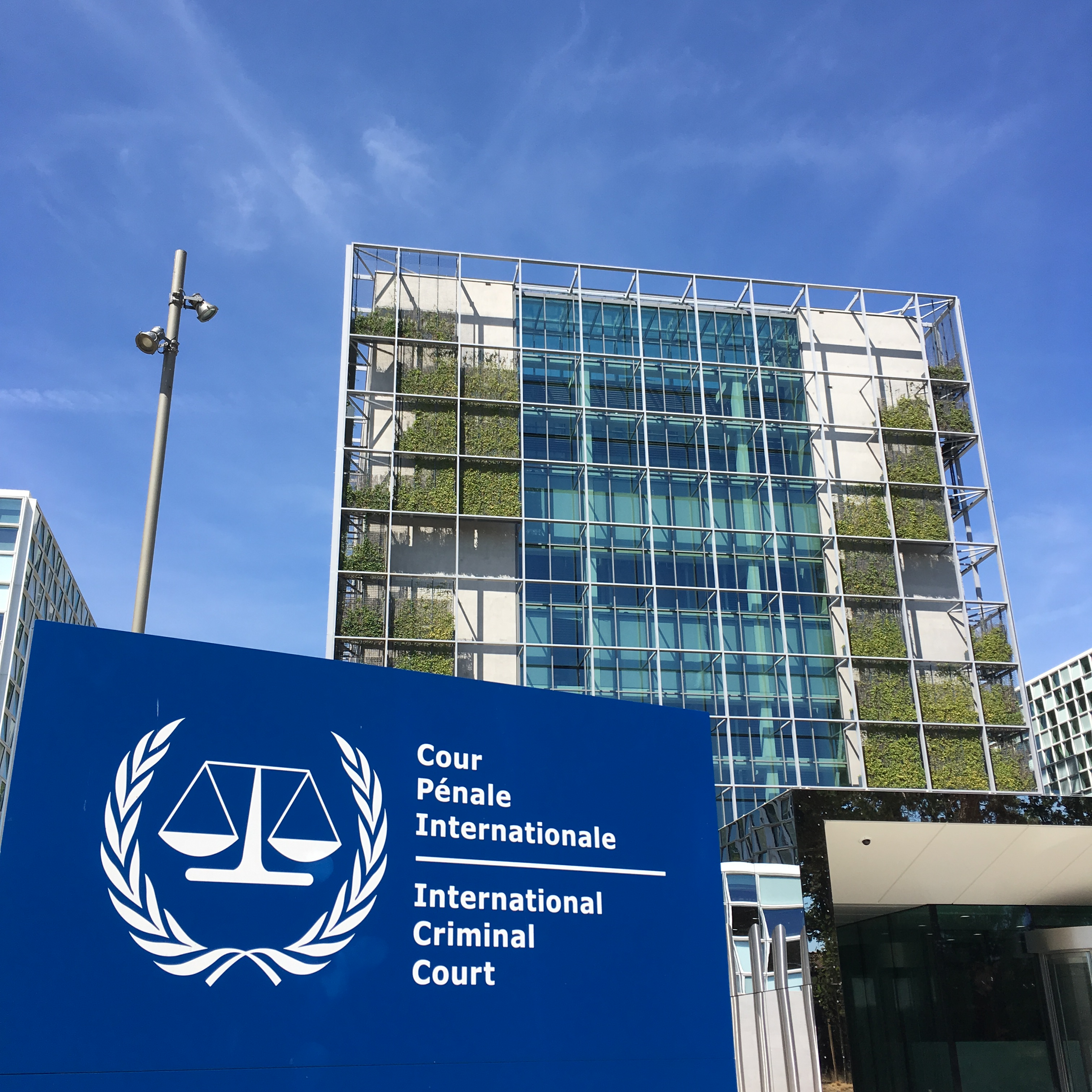
The premises of the International Criminal Court in The Hague, Netherlands

On 5 March 2024, based on the violations of the Rome Statute, the International Criminal Court (ICC) indicted Lieutenant general Sergei Kobylash, Commander of Russian Aerospace Forces, and Admiral Viktor Sokolov, Commander of the Black Sea Fleet, for war crimes and crimes against humanity perpetrated through attacks at civilian objects, causing excessive incidental harm to civilians or damage to civilian objects, and inhumane acts during the attacks against Ukrainian electric infrastructure from October 2022 through March 2023.

On 25 June 2024, the ICC indicted former Minister of Defence Sergei Shoigu and Head of General Staff of the Armed Forces of the Russian Federation Valery Gerasimov for the same three counts.

== See also ==
- Aerial bombardment and international law
- Attacks on civilians in the Russian invasion of Ukraine
- War crimes in the Russian invasion of Ukraine
- 2022 Moldovan energy crisis
- Domicide
- The Blitz
- Operation Rolling Thunder
- Infrastructure bombing in the Gulf War air campaign
- Russo-Ukrainian cyberwarfare
- 2015 Ukraine power grid hack
- Ukrainian energy crisis
