= Novyi Korotych =

Village in Kharkiv Oblast, Ukraine

Novyi Korotych Новий Коротич
- Rural settlement
- Interactive map of Novyi Korotych
- Location of Novyi Korotych within Kharkiv Novyi Korotych (Ukraine)
- Coordinates: 49.955833°N 36.011389°E
- Country: Ukraine
- Oblast: Kharkiv Oblast
- Raion: Kharkiv Raion
- Hromada: Pisochyn
- Founded: 1943

Area
  - Total: 0.66 km^{2} (0.25 sq mi)
- Elevation: 127 m (417 ft)

Population (2001 census)
  - Total: 836
  - Density: 1,300/km^{2} (3,300/sq mi)
- Time zone: UTC+2 (EET)
  - Summer (DST): UTC+3 (EEST)
- Postal code: 62455
- Area code: +380 57

Novyi Korotych (Ukrainian: Новий Коротич; Russian: Новый Коротыч), known as Komunar (Комунар) until 2016, is a rural settlement (selyshche) in Kharkiv Raion (district) in Kharkiv Oblast of Ukraine, at about 16.48 kilometres (10.24 mi) west by south (WbS) of the centre of Kharkiv City. It belongs to Pisochyn settlement hromada, one of the hromadas of Ukraine. Novyi Korotych borders in east with the settlement of Korotych.

== History ==
=== 2022 Russian invasion of Ukraine ===
On 21 October 2023, eight postal workers were killed and 17 others were injured in a Russian missile attack on the privately owned Nova Poshta sorting office at Novyi Korotych.

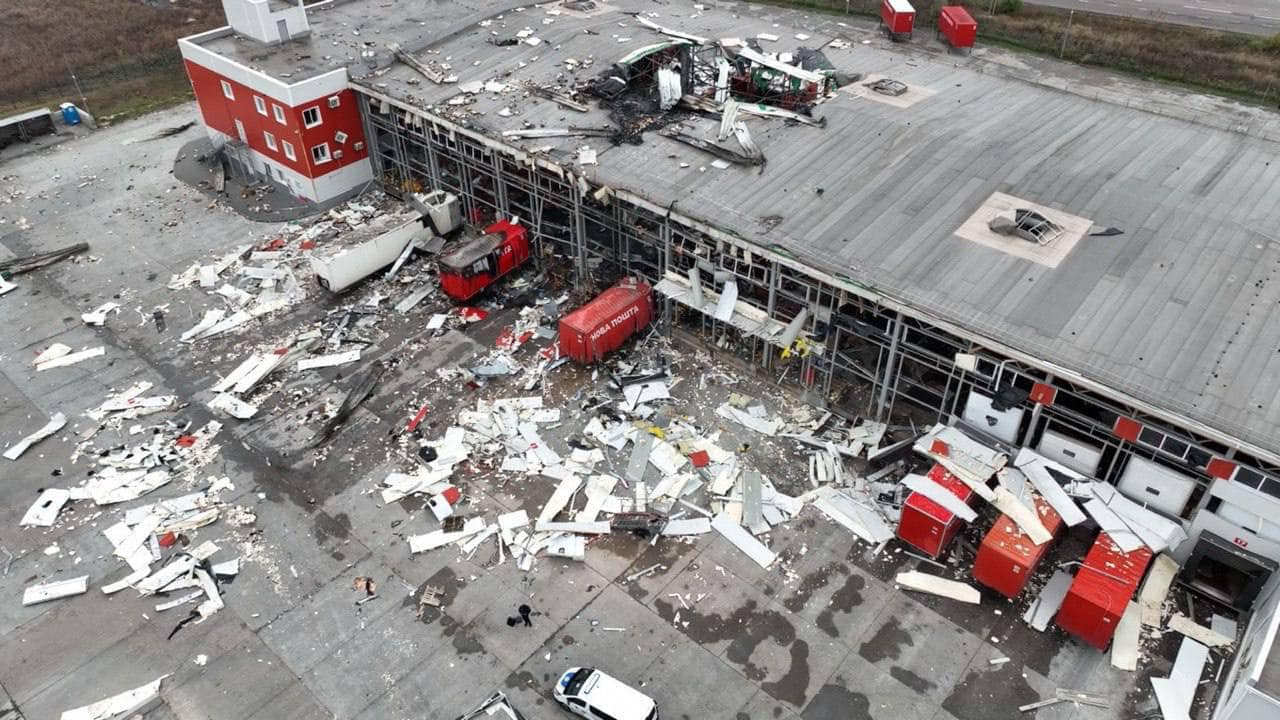
Postal distribution centre after the strike

== Demographics ==
In 2001 the settlement had 836 inhabitants, native language as of the 2001 Ukrainian census:

- Ukrainian – 63.10%
- Russian – 35.95%
- Belarusian – 0.71%
- Romanian – 0.12%
