= Harbakha =

Agrotown in Brest Region, Belarus

Harbakha: Гарбаха
- Agrotown
- Location within Belarus
- Coordinates: 52°05′31″N 25°21′26″E
- Country: Belarus
- Region: Brest Region
- District: Ivanava District

Population (2009)
  - Total: 516
- Time zone: UTC+3 (MSK)
- Area code: +375 1652
- License plate: 1

Harbakha (Belarusian: Гарба́ха) is an agrotown in Ivanava District, Brest Region, Belarus.

== History ==
During the interwar period, it was located in Polesie Voivodeship, Poland. After World War II, it was within the borders of the Soviet Union, and since 1991, in independent Belarus.

On 29 December 2022, a Ukrainian S-300 air defence missile was shot down by the Belarusian authorities, crashing near Harbakha. This occurred following a Russian wave of missile strikes against Ukrainian infrastructure during the Russian invasion of Ukraine. Both sides acknowledged the incident as an accident.

== Geography ==
It is located 16 kilometers southwest of the city of Ivanava, 156 kilometers from Brest and 11 kilometers from Snitovo.

== Demographics ==
In 1921, the village had 368 residents, living in 74 buildings, including 248 locals, 109 Poles and 11 Belarusians. 340 residents were Orthodox, 27 Mosaic and 1 Roman Catholic. In 1996, the town had 548 inhabitants and 279 yards. In 2009, the town had 516 inhabitants.

== Climate ==
The climate in Harbakha is moderate, characterized by warm summers and mild winters, and this region has the warmest climate in the region. Cyclones often pass in winter from the north-west in summer and south or south-west in winter.

== External sources ==
- Pashkoŭ, Henadzʹ.; Пашкоў, Генадзь. (1996–2004). Belaruskai︠a︡ ėntsyklapedyi︠a︡ (in Chinese). Minsk. ISBN 985-11-0035-8. OCLC 35890197.
