= Petropavlovka, Ostrogozhsky District, Voronezh Oblast =

Petropavlovka Петропавловка
- Selo
- Location within Voronezh Oblast Location within Russia
- Coordinates: 51°00′N 39°11′E
- Country: Russia
- Region: Voronezh Oblast
- District: Ostrogozhsky District
- Time zone: UTC+3:00

Petropavlovka (Russian: Петропавловка) is a rural locality (a selo) and the administrative center of Petropavlovskoye Rural Settlement, Ostrogozhsky District, Voronezh Oblast, Russia. The population was 678 as of 2010. There are 11 streets.

== Geography ==
Petropavlovka is located 21 km northeast of Ostrogozhsk (the district's administrative centre) by road. Korotoyak is the nearest rural locality.

== History ==
During the 2 January 2024 Russian strikes on Ukraine during the Russian invasion of Ukraine, Russian bomber accidentally dropped a bomb on Petropavlovka. The Russian Defense Ministry said no one was killed or injured, but that at least six buildings were damaged. They said they were beginning an investigation into the incident. Later local authorities reported 4 injured people and more than 100 damaged houses, 9 of which were destroyed completely.
