= Destruction of the Kozarovychi Dam =

2022 dam breach in Ukraine

- Part of the Battle of Moshchun during the Russian invasion of Ukraine
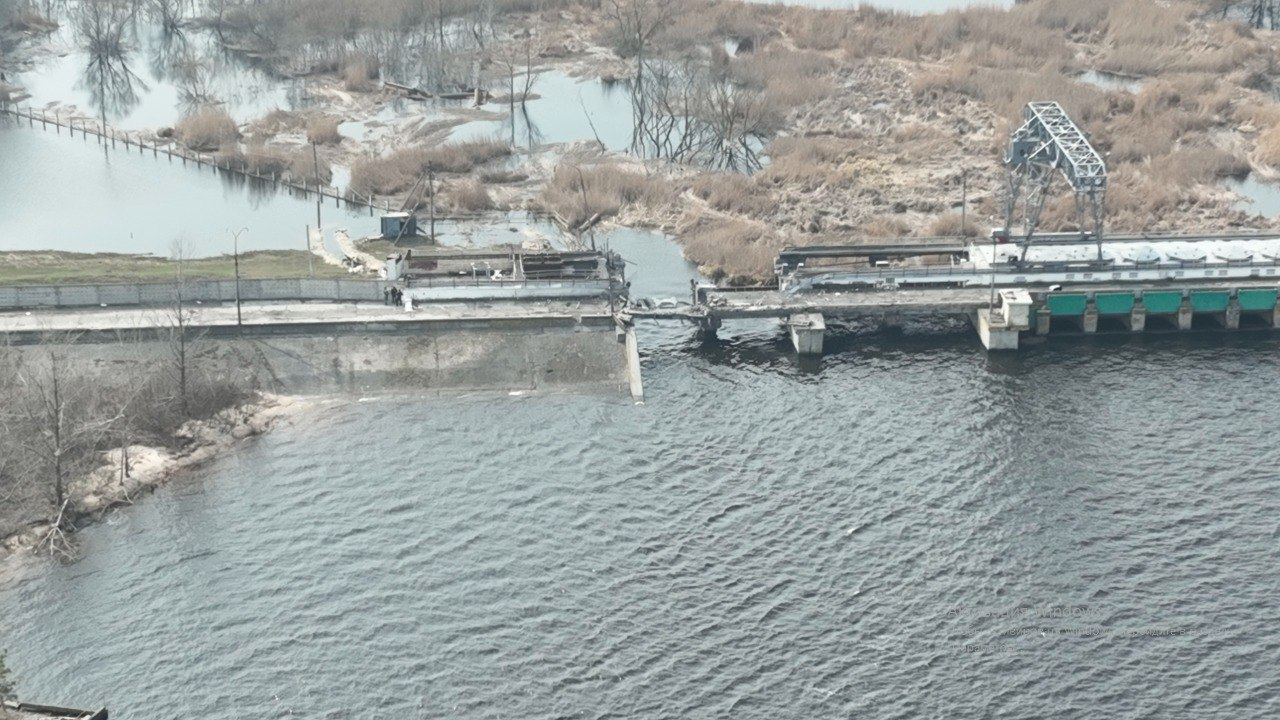
- The destroyed dam on the Irpin River in the village of Kozarovychi
- Location: 50°44′39″N 30°22′06″E; Kozarovychi, Kyiv Oblast, Ukraine
- Date: 26 February 2022
- Target: Disruption of Russian advances
- Attack type: Dam breaching
- Perpetrator: Armed Forces of Ukraine

The destruction of the Kozarovychi Dam, which separated the reclaimed floodplain of the Irpin River from the Kyiv Reservoir, was carried out by the Armed Forces of Ukraine on February 26, 2022, in order to prevent the advance of Russian troops during Russia's invasion of Ukraine. As a result, more than 2,800 hectares of land were flooded, as well as residential areas in the villages of Kozarovychi and Demydiv.

== Course of events ==
The Kyiv Reservoir was created during the construction of the Kyiv Hydroelectric Power Plant in the 1960s. To protect the lands in the floodplain of the Irpin River from flooding, the 1.4 km long Kozarovychi Dam was built, separating the floodplain from the reservoir, in addition to a pumping station that pumps river water into the reservoir. As a result, the water level in the reservoir was three meters higher than in the floodplain of the river.

There were many issues with the destruction of the dam at the onset of the Russian invasion of Ukraine. First of all, the technical implementation of its destruction was regarded as an effective act of suicide due to the regular shelling of the territory of the dam and the pumping station by enemy artillery from Russian troops who had already arrived nearby. Secondly, the correct calculation of the power of the explosion and the scale of the impact was extremely important for achieving the intended goals without dying. With a strong explosion, there was a threat that a huge mass of water from the Kyiv Reservoir could sweep away the villages along the Irpin river, which would cause great destruction and human casualties. In addition, due to local residents already being cut off from any logistics, it was extremely important to blow up the dam only partially so that it was possible to enter and leave nearby villages. However, this was not possible with Ukraine's military equipment. The dam had to be blown up twice, as the first time was unsuccessful.

== Consequences ==
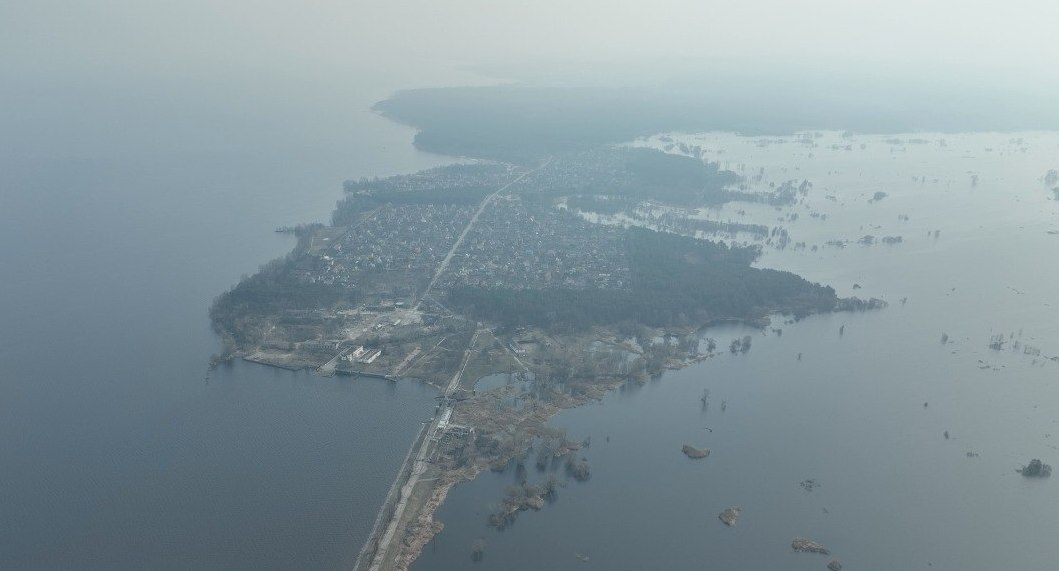
Flooded village of Demydiv as a result of the dam breach

According to The New York Times, artificial flooding played a key role in the fighting near Kyiv in March 2022. The spilled water created an effective barrier for tanks, forcing the Russian troops to advance from other directions — in the area of Hostomel, Bucha, and Irpin, where they were forced into urban combat. Attempts by Russian troops to cross the Irpin River by placing pontoon bridges proved unsuccessful.

As reported by the Minister of Environmental Protection and Natural Resources of Ukraine Ruslan Strilets, the amount of damage caused by flooding amounted to 27.5 million hryvnias. There were also fears about the ecological consequences of what happened, because landfills, cesspools, and fields treated with organic fertilizers became part of the flooded zone.

Russian troops retreated from Kyiv in April 2022, but as of November 2022, the flooding had not been eliminated, while work was underway to restore the dam. Some ecologists suggested preserving the floodplain in a completely or partially flooded and swampy state.

The Republic of Korea announced that it would help restore the Kozarovychi Dam. The cost of the works was estimated at US$14 million. Two Korean companies will help in the restoration: K-Water and KOICA.

== Assessment ==
The Washington Post described the destruction of the dam as an example of "hydraulic warfare" — the deliberate flooding of territory during armed conflict.

== See also ==
- Destruction of the Kakhovka Dam
- Environmental impact of the Russian invasion of Ukraine
