= Environmental impact of the Russo-Ukrainian war =

Overview of invasion's environmental impact

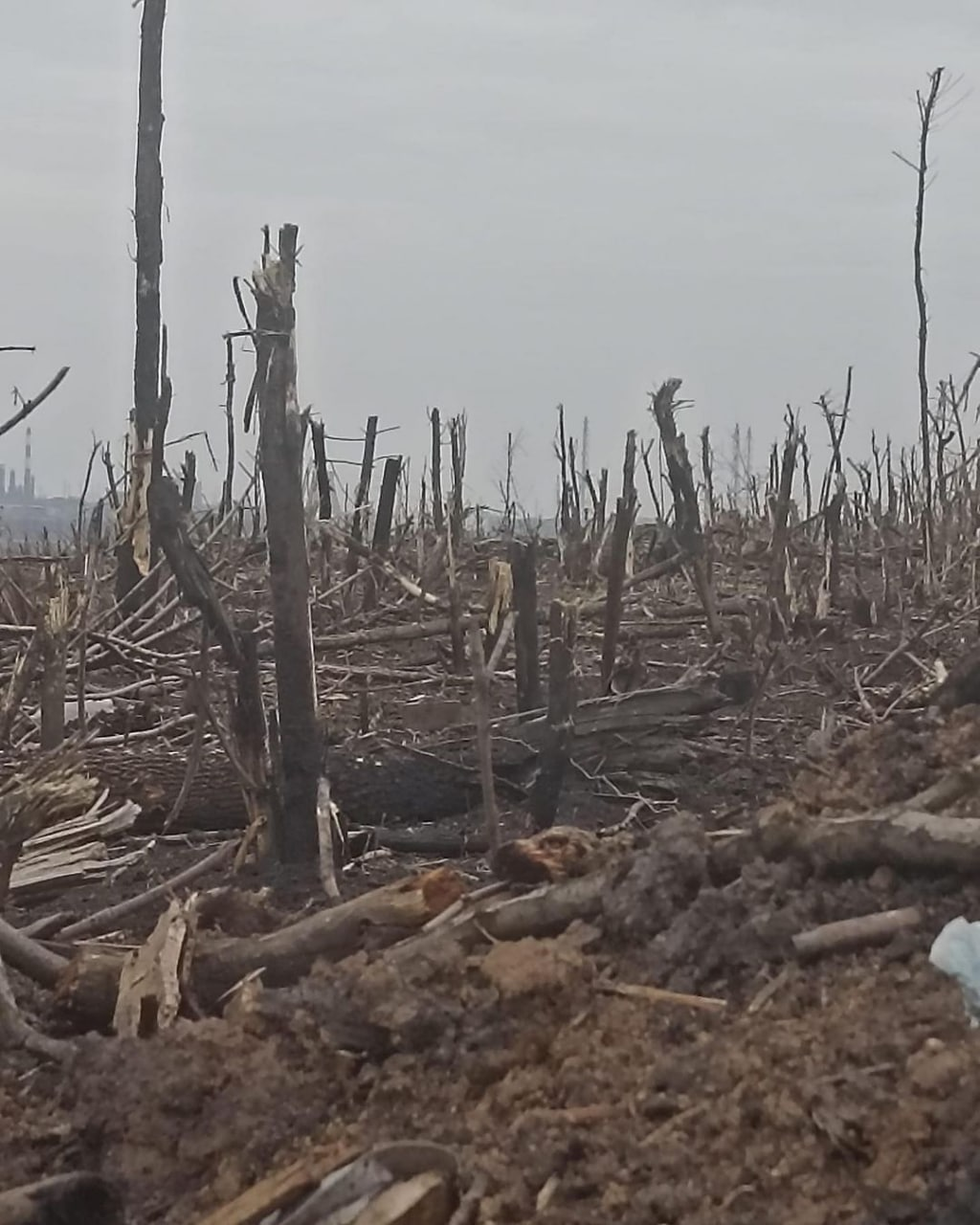
- No-man's-land at the battle of Bakhmut, 26 November 2022
- Status: Ongoing
- Genre: Ecocide
- Date: February 24, 2022
- Country: Ukraine, Russia
- Years active: 4
- Founder: Russia

The Russian invasion of Ukraine has led to ongoing widespread and possibly serious and long-term environmental damage. The Ukrainian government, journalists and international observers describe the damage as ecocide.

Explosions inflict toxic damage along with physical destruction. Every explosion releases particles of toxic substances such as lead, mercury and depleted uranium into the environment. When ingested, explosives like TNT, DNT, and RDX, cause illness.

Fights in heavily industrialised areas may lead to technological disasters, such as spills of tailings and fuel, that poison vast territories not only in Ukraine, but also in Europe and Russia. Destroyed buildings may release carcinogenic dust that remains hazardous for decades. Heavy metals and chemicals may penetrate underground waters and poison water sources, killing life in rivers and water bodies. Destruction of civil infrastructure has already left more than four million people without access to clean drinking water. Soils in some areas of military conflict are no longer fit for agriculture, because plants draw up and accumulate the pollutants.

War also increases the risk of nuclear accidents. Power shortages at nuclear plants and fights in the vicinity of stations may result in disasters with impacts similar to Chernobyl and Fukushima. Military emissions of CO_{2} reach hundreds of million tonnes and undermine the goals of the Paris Agreement.

More than 12,000 square kilometres (4,600 sq mi) of Ukraine's nature reserves have become a war zone. Populations of rare endemic and migrant species have already suffered great losses, and birds have been forced to abandon nests and change their usual migration routes. The efforts of decades-long conservation projects have been ruined.

Estimating the total environmental damage inflicted by the war is not possible until it ends. According to preliminary data, it will take Ukraine's nature at least 15 years to recover.

== War damage to nature ==
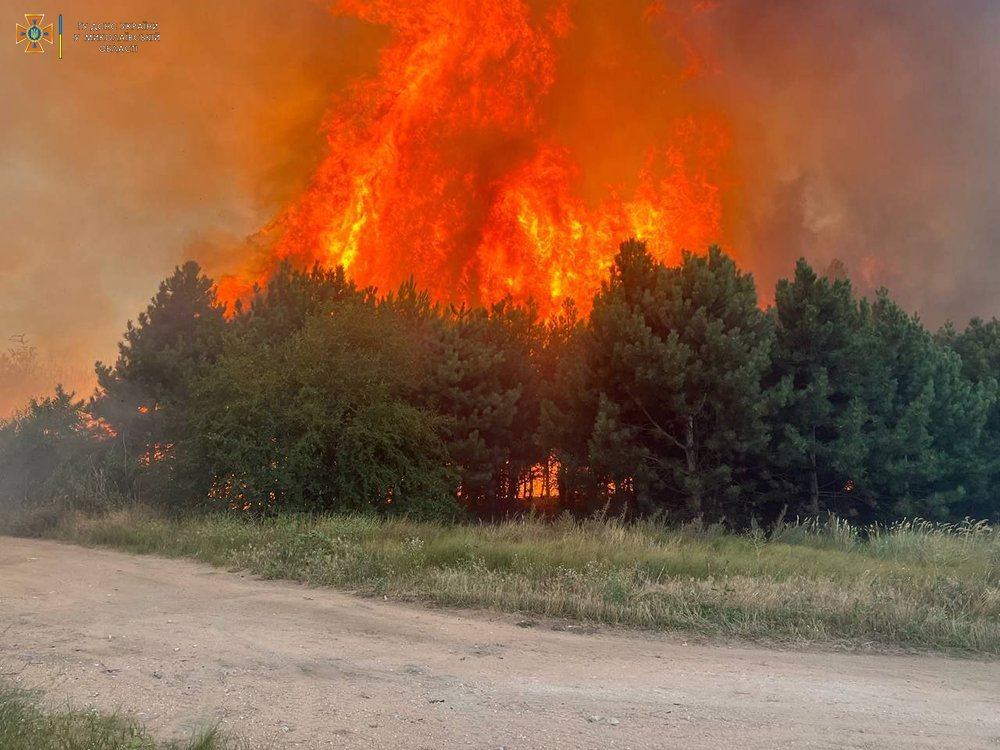
A wildfire due to shelling in Mykolaiv Oblast, 9 August 2022

Environmental damage caused by war can last for centuries. According to studies, soils near Ypres in Belgium still contain more than 2,000 tonnes (4.4 million pounds) of copper after World War I. In Iran, soils are still contaminated with mercury and chlorine after fights during the Iranian Revolution. The First and Second Chechen War left more than 30% of soils in Chechnya unsuitable for agriculture.

Depending on soil pH and access of oxygen and water, it takes from 100 to 300 years for ammunition to degrade. Destroyed cities pose a huge ecological threat because undetonated bombs are buried in debris, (Note: Modern ammo fail rate is estimated at 5%.) ruined houses release cancerogenic dust (sometimes for decades), and millions of tonnes of rubble are almost impossible to recycle. Asbestos may be released into the air from the rubble. Forced mass relocation of people overloads the infrastructure of host regions. Refugee camps accumulate waste and have almost no recycling facilities.

In 2014, it cost approximately €2.50 to plant a mine in Ukraine, while it cost more than €900 to clear that mine. Lots of research is required to fully estimate the environmental damage caused by the Russian invasion, although this is impractical until hostilities cease. As of June 2022, Ukraine's Ministry of Environment estimates the cost at €6.6 billion.

=== Direct pollution ===
After the first two weeks of hostilities, air monitoring in Kyiv showed pollutant concentrations 27 times higher than normal. Explosions, destroyed armor and vehicles, burning and spilled fuel pollute air, water, and soils. The explosion of every bomb releases particles of heavy metals, formaldehydes, nitrous oxide, hydrogen cyanide, and toxic organic compounds. These pollutants are spread by winds and underground waters, which is why the hazardous ecological impact of war will directly affect Russia and Europe. The explosives release chemical compounds that are oxidized in air and may cause acid rain. They can 'burn' vegetation and respiratory organs of mammals (including humans).

Around 95–97% of ammunition is lead. The rest is made of materials such as zinc, nickel, barium, manganese, copper and antimony, and sometimes depleted uranium. Lead is highly toxic and highly ingestible, and enters the human body not only when people breathe, eat and drink, but also through skin and hair. Prolonged exposure to lead causes kidney failure, and even short-term contact affects the nervous system and induces encephalopathy, as well as anemia, loss of coordination and memory. Similar neurotoxic effects occur in animals.

Particles of depleted uranium are 100 times smaller than leukocytes and easily bypass the blood-brain barrier, and are thus capable of reaching the olfactory nerves and disrupting cognitive processes directly. Antimony causes inflammation of cardiovascular, respiratory and digestive systems. Nickel also damages the immune system. Exposure to high concentrations of copper, manganese and zinc can have a poisonous effect and induce pneumonia, pulmonary fibrosis, and lethargy. Microparticles of destroyed ammunition shells may enter water and penetrate human and animal bodies through the food chain.

Explosives, such as TNT, DNT, and RDX, cause chemical pollution and induce acute intoxication and long-term mutagenic effects in people. TNT is easily absorbed through skin and mucous membranes. Depending on the dose, its cancerogenic effects can induce alopecia, anemia, liver failure, and cataracts, and change blood composition. Hexogen poisoning causes nausea and anemia, prolonged exposure leads to kidney and liver failure. DNT is also toxic, in high doses it can disrupt the cardiovascular system and provoke oncology. The explosion of one BM-21 Grad releases more than 500 grams (18 oz) of sulfur that reacts with water and turns into sulfurous acid. War-damaged land is 'burned' with acid.

According to the Pentagon, by July 2022 at least 1200 rockets and bombs had exploded in Ukraine. In the first days of the invasion, the Russian army bombed ammunition depots located near urban areas. Toxic clouds raised by the massive explosions and fires covered residential districts and villages; severe damage to health of the locals may be the result. The infamous 'Pančevo cancer' is an example of such exposure — a spike of oncology has been recorded among Pančevo 1999 bombing survivors. Many scientists are sure that toxic damage caused by hostilities is even more hazardous to the human population than explosions.

According to Russian journalist Yulia Latynina, the toxic fuel of malfunctioning air-launched cruise missiles from Russian Tu-95 and Tu-160 bombers deployed over the Caspian Sea during the invasion caused the mass die-off of Caspian seals in 2022. According to Latynina, some missiles fail to launch properly due to their age and fell close to their launch point. To avoid accidental failures over land, launches are made over water. Since the start of the invasion several mass die-offs of Caspian seals have been recorded, such as in the spring of 2022 when, between 31 March and 2 May, 832 carcasses were found in Kazakhstan's Mangystau Region, and in the summer of that same year when 837 carcasses were found on Kazakhstan's coast.

=== 2026 environmental disasters ===
In April 2026, Ukrainian attacks on the Tuapse Refinery and Perm refinery caused significant environmental contamination.

In early May 2026 a series of major forest fires started in northern Kyiv, Chernihiv and Sumy regions of Ukraine, including parts of Chernobyl exclusion zone. The fires didn't affect the level of radiation in the area. The Russian side of the border also suffered from a number of fires. Most conflagrations on both sides of the border were blamed on artillery shellings, aerial bomb explosions and drone attacks. There was no proof of purposeful arson. The situation has been exacerbated by dry weather and strong winds, as well as complication of firefighting activities due to ongoing hostilities.

=== Wildfires ===
In 2024, the Joint Research Centre reported that Ukraine had the worst fire season ever logged in the European Forest Fire Information System, with fires across 965,000 hectares, more than twice the area that burned in the whole European Union in the same period. The distribution of the fires matched the frontline of the war. Ukrainian firefighters are often unable to move quickly in forests due to landmines, and by October 2024, 14 forest workers had been killed by mines, booby traps and shelling during the war.

=== Bombing of industrial sites ===
Eastern Ukraine was a highly industrialized area, with more than 900 facilities and production centres, including coal mines, oil refineries, chemical labs and steel plants. The Conflict and Environment Observatory (CEOBS) estimated that more than 10 million tonnes (22 billion pounds) of toxic waste and tailings are stored in this region. Direct hits and explosions result in leakages of hazardous materials that poison air, water, and soils. Accidents at high-risk industrial sites can escalate with a domino effect and cause disastrous thermal, hydro, and chemical discharges.

As of 1 April 2022, more than 36 attacks had been registered on fossil fuel infrastructure, 29 attacks on electricity stations, seven on water infrastructure, and six on nuclear sites. More than 60 fires occurred at Ukraine's oil refineries by June 2022. Accidents at huge industrial enterprises such as Azovstal, Lysychansk Oil Refinery, or Sumykhimprom could lead to disastrous environmental damage. However, Azovstal initiated a program of environmentally safe shutdown in the first week of the Russian invasion. Coke ovens were stopped, the temperature was lowered, and liquid glass was poured in to prevent the coking process from continuing and the coke oven gas to be released as intensively as possible. (Note: Coke oven gas kills a person after three seconds exposure. If a water tuyere in the convertor department is damaged and water gets into melted metal tanks, it vaporizes and releases hydrogen which explodes.) On 25 February, chemical reagents were disposed of. An attack on Lysychansk refinery ignited the 50,000-tonne (110-million-pound) tank of oil sludge, two reservoirs with 20,000 tonnes (44 million pounds) of petroleum, and a sulphur store.

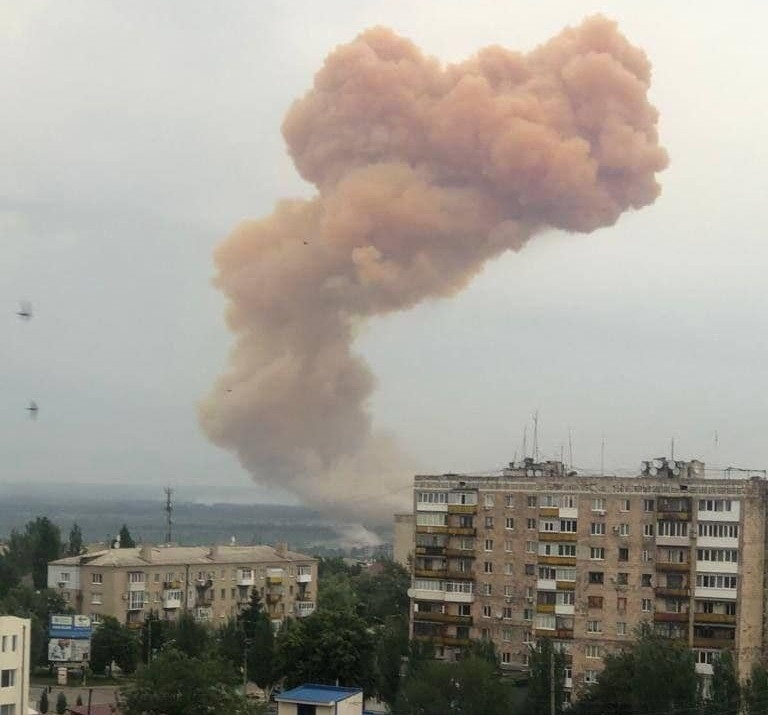
An explosion due to the shelling of a tank filled with nitric acid in Sievierodonetsk, 31 May 2022

The number of attacks on industrial centres caused international observers and the Ukrainian government to identify them as ecocide. For instance, on 21 March ammonia reservoirs at Sumykhimprom were hit. The resulted leakage covered an area 2.5 kilometres (1.6 mi) in radius, and the people of Novoselitsy village were told to hide in shelters. On 5 and 9 April, nitric acid tanks in Rubizhne were blown up: the police of the Donetsk People's Republic and the Ukrainian army blamed each other. On 4 April 2022, a Russian rocket was shot down in Kremenets Raion, and the debris fell onto a farm and hit reservoirs with organic fertilizers, causing leakage. Though the tanks were nearly empty, the spill was enough to poison the local river Ikva. A few days later, water sampling showed ammonia concentration at 163 times above safe, and dead fish were reported on its banks. On 31 May, in Sievierodonetsk Raion a tank with nitric acid was blown up, and a chemical cloud forced locals to hide in shelters. As of June 2022, Ukrainian observers registered more than 2000 cases of environmental damage caused by hostilities.

Forced migration is another risk caused by the war, because without human control even out of service industrial sites may be hazardous. Most plants and industrial sites in East Ukraine were built during the Soviet era, and that infrastructure is now significantly worn-out. For instance, at Dzerzhinsk phenol plant there are two ponds of toxic waste, one of which has a dam that was identified as unstable in 2019. In case of a breach, 8 million tonnes (18 billion pounds) of chemical waste will pour onto the surrounding lands and the Zalizna river, poisoning water sources in the region, and reaching the Seversky Donets that flows into Russia.

Coal mines throughout eastern Ukraine have deteriorated rapidly, as active and expanded hostilities have made it difficult for maintenance projects to continue. The potential for pollution of ground and surface water throughout the entire Donbas region has been reported. When a mine is flooded, radionuclides and toxic substances contaminate underground waters, poisoning water sources of local residential areas. (Note: For instance, during World War II some mines in Donbass were flooded and the government relocated people from the region. The drainage and restoration took five years. For now, it is hard to evaluate the damage caused by polluted water from flooded mines. However, there are immediate effects such as subsidence and methane explosions in the basements of local houses.) Eurocommission specialists registered at least 35 abandoned coal mines in Donbass, including the Yunkom coal mine, which was used for a nuclear test in 1979. The waters of Komyshuvakha river turned orange in 2021 because of leakage from the abandoned Zolotoe mine. Risks of a human-made disaster caused by the Russian invasion are growing every day that the war continues. Worst-case scenarios include pollution of the Azov sea with toxic waste.

== Carbon footprint of war ==
The carbon footprint of this war undermines efforts towards CO_{2} emissions reduction. The first two years of the war have resulted in considerable releases of Greenhouse gas emissions, and many more may be released due to the need to rebuild destroyed infrastructure. Overall, it has been estimated to amounts to 175 million tonnes (390 billion pounds) in carbon dioxide equivalent.

== Nuclear threats ==
Ukraine is home to four nuclear power plants, as well as the Chernobyl Exclusion Zone, site of the 1986 Chernobyl disaster. As of January 2024, both the Chernobyl and the Zaporizhzhia nuclear power plants saw battles during the war that resulted from the 2022 Russian invasion of Ukraine. The invasion has prompted significant discussion about the status of the power plants, including fears of potential disasters, and has also prompted debates about nuclear energy programmes in other European countries.

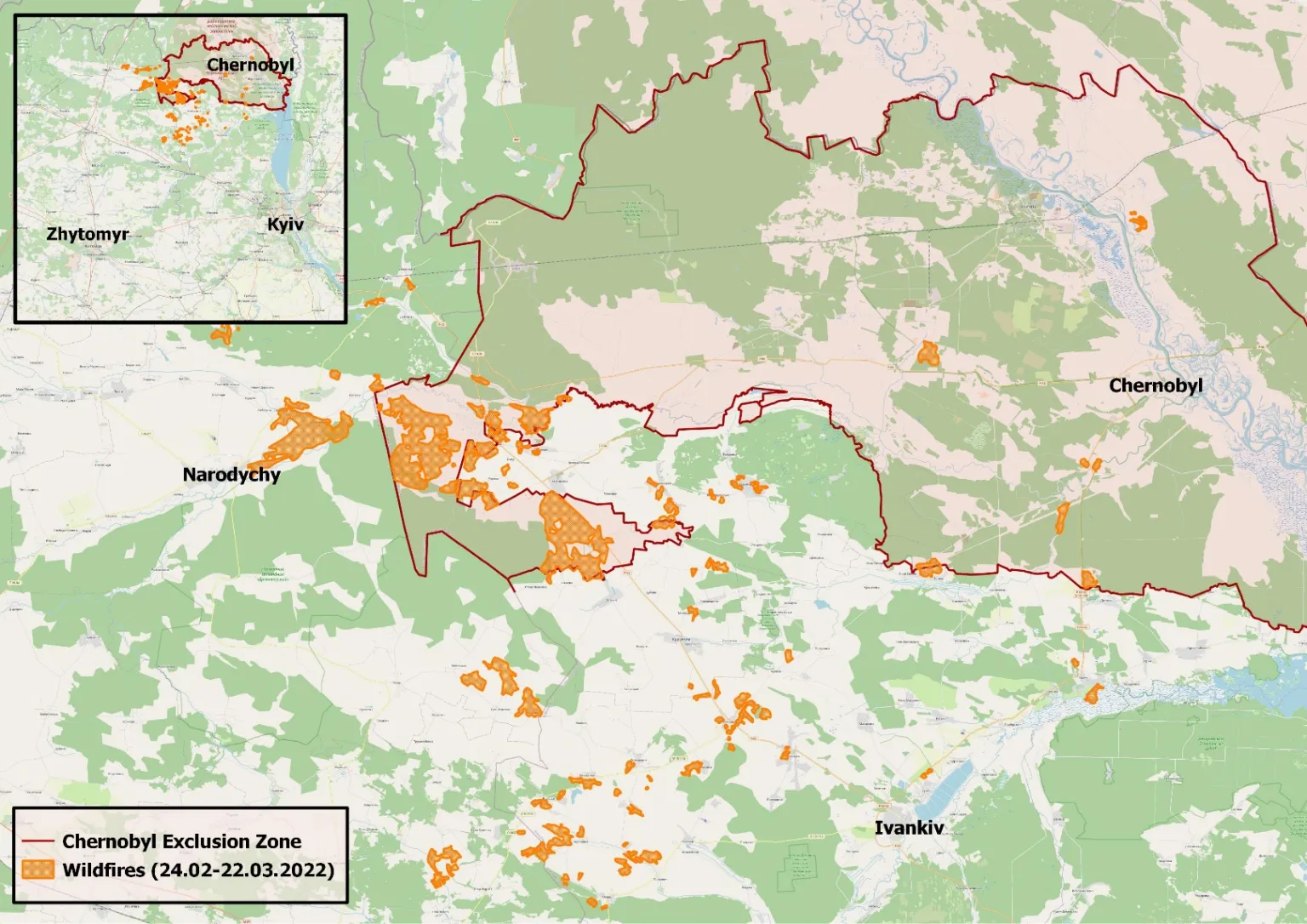
Fires in the forests around Chernobyl between 24 February and 22 March

== Damaged biologic systems ==
=== Fertile soils ===
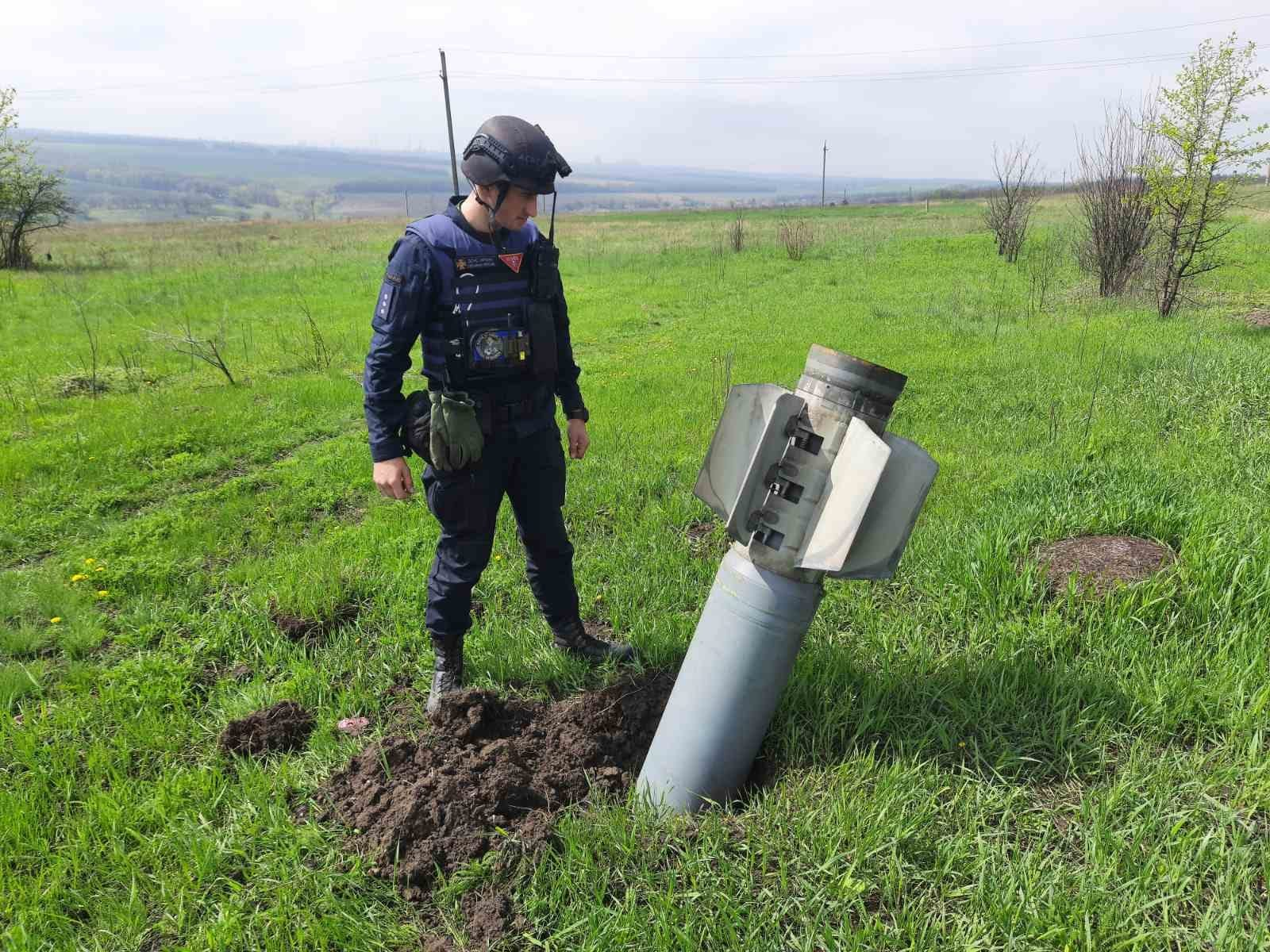
Missile in a meadow in Luhansk Oblast

Fields in Kharkiv Oblast strewn with craters after the battles

Battles and shelling ruin fertile soils for a long time. The highly fertile chernozem, which made Ukraine one of the world's largest grain exporters, suffers from pollution with heavy metals, chemicals, lubricants, and spent fuel. Vegetation grown on contaminated land absorbs these pollutants and transfers them to humans via the food chain. According to a UN estimate, in 2022 in Donbass alone more than 530 hectares (1,300 acres) were rated areas of ecological catastrophe.

Research indicates that chernozem is physically damaged by tanks and heavy vehicles: their weight makes the soil clump and stick together, and earthworms and other animals that normally stir up and aerate soil are scared off by the noise. Communities of soil microbes are reduced at least for several years. Wet soils need at least four years to recover from tank traffic. Also, with the decrease of vegetation cover, pollutants penetrate easily and tend to go deeper into the ground.

Ecologists also note that an abrupt suspension of agricultural use on fields leads to uncontrolled reproduction of mice and weeds.

=== Water sources ===
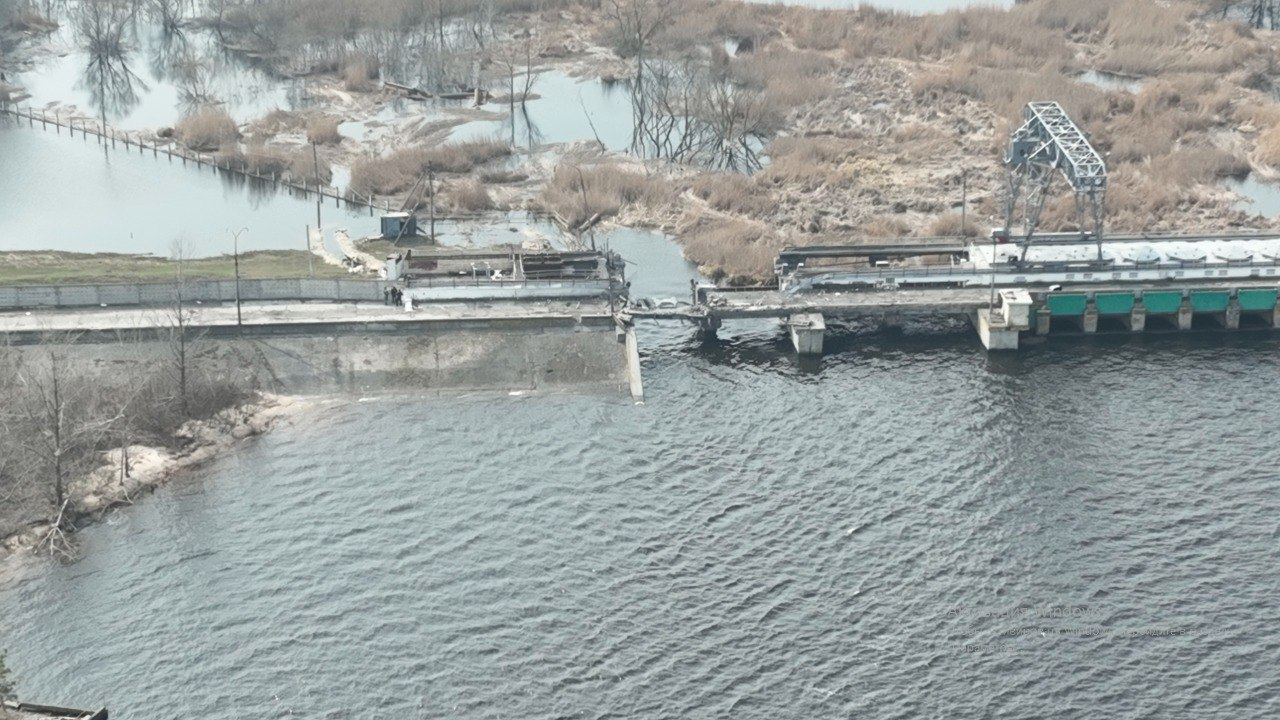
A destroyed dam near Kozarovychi

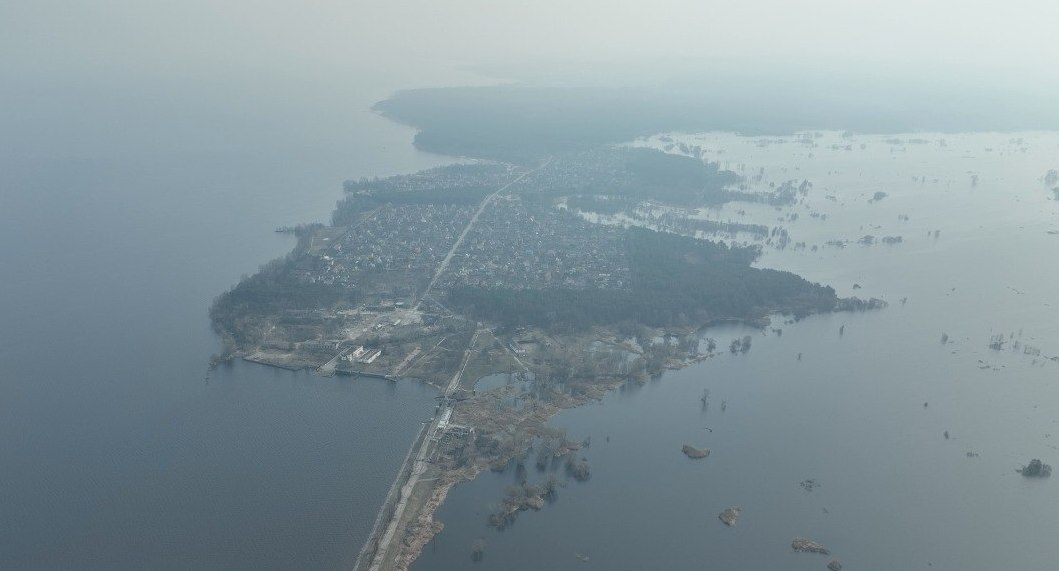
The village of Demydiv after flooding

The Russia–Ukraine conflict has had a profound impact on water resources and water infrastructure.

Rivers and water bodies are strategically important objects. The Dnieper, Donets, and Irpin serve as natural defences. The Black Sea also became a theatre of war. Destroyed and abandoned vehicles pollute water with leaking fuel and lubricants: fuel spills induce fires and ruin the chemical balance of water. Oil itself is highly toxic to marine wildlife and microorganisms, but also it contains hydrocarbons that dissolve pollutants such as pesticides or heavy metals and lead to their concentration in the upper layers of water.

Dam destruction causes degradation of vast territories, as well as soil and water contamination. For example, on 26 February 2022, a dam on the Irpin River near Kozarovychi village was destroyed by Russian troops, resulting in a flood that covered more than 10 kilometres (6.2 mi) and reached Horenka. Any effects on the biodiversity of the Gulf of Odesa, Danube Delta, and Azov Sea, are yet to be estimated.

On 6 June 2023, the Kakhovka Dam was destroyed, sending approximately 90 percent of the freshwater content from what was the largest reservoir by volume in Ukraine downstream. The Dnieper–Bug estuary was inundated, and salinity in neighbouring Odesa abruptly declined starting 7 June from an average 11 parts per thousand, reaching a nadir of 4.2 to 4.4 ppt by 13 and 14 June. The discharge contained sediment contaminated by decades of industrial activity, raising polychlorinated biphenyl and lindane concentrations downstream, as well as copper, zinc and arsenic levels. Dissolved nitrogen and phosphorus in the floodwaters caused an algal bloom near Odesa. A rare fish species, Sander marinus, may have been extirpated from the Dnieper–Bug estuary due to its low tolerance for rapid salinity changes (stenohaline) and toxins. Anadromous species of sturgeon whose migration route is blocked by the Dnieper River dams may have been eliminated by the dam's destruction, which occurred during their migration period. A state-run hatchery for protected sturgeon species in Dniprovske was flooded and destroyed. Recolonization of the damaged estuary by invasive species is also a concern. In the long term, the dam removal may permit upstream ecosystem restoration of the Great Meadow and reduce the impacts of impoundment on seasonal flow variation, erosion and sediment transportation downstream, but the Kakhovka Dam provided benefits to the population in the form of irrigation for agriculture and water supply for neighbouring large cities and industries, including cooling for the Zaporizhzhia Nuclear Power Plant.

The Seversky Donets river was in a critical condition back in 2018. The river serves as a water source for all Donbass, but levels of heavy metals and alkylphenols in it were seven times higher than acceptable. In 2022, bombs destroyed Popasnyansky and Uzhnodonbassky waterways, 'Seversky Donets - Donbass' channel, and the Donetskaya filtration plant was stopped several times due to power shortages. Untreated sewage runoff spilled into the river after pipeline ruptures. The hostilities destroyed the water infrastructure that served four million people and left them with no access to clean drinking water. Drinking polluted water affects inner organs, sometimes a week is enough to poison the liver and cause death. Polluted waters flow downstream and contaminate soils and underground water in Russia.

=== National parks and nature reserves ===
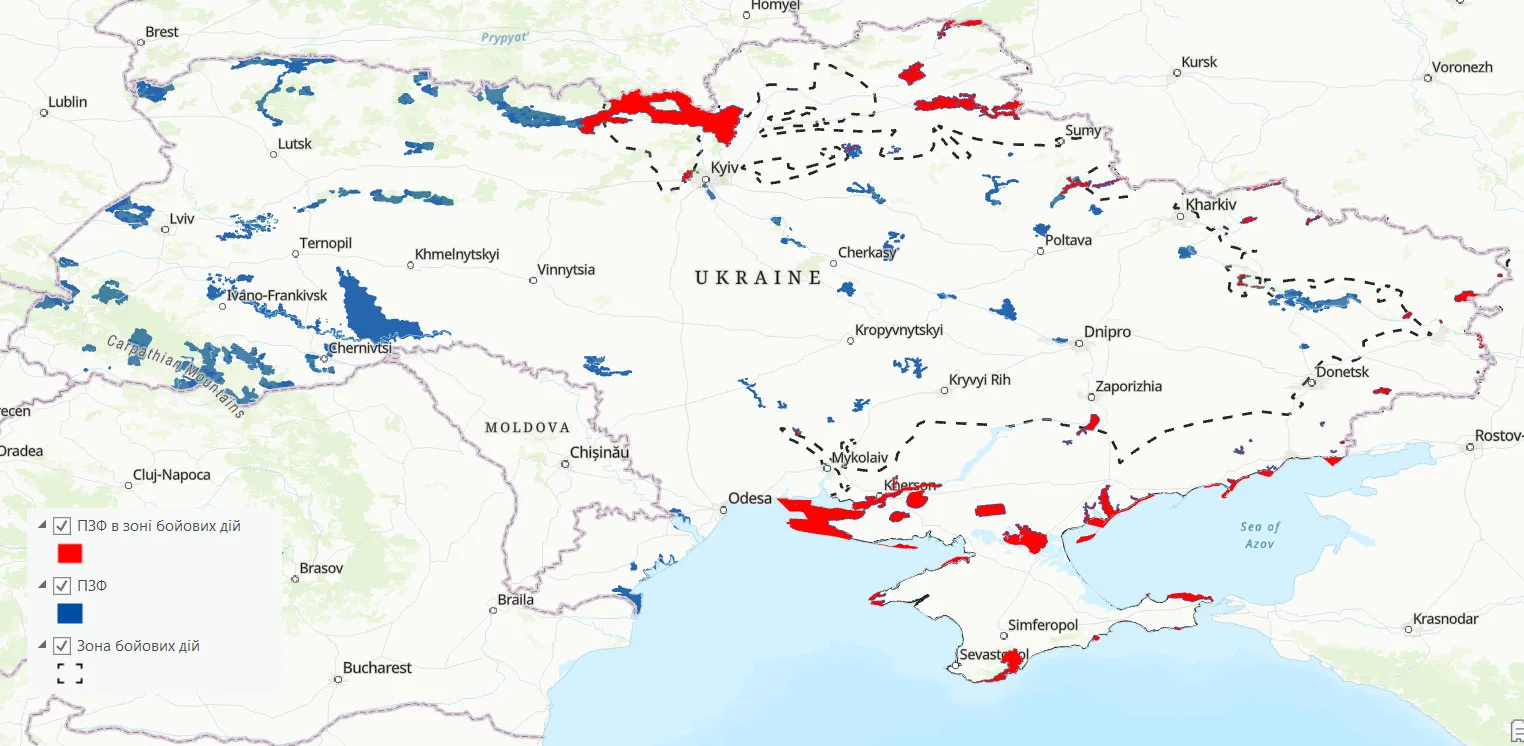
National parks and reserves affected by hostilities as of April 2022

Ukraine's national parks and reserves are a part of pan-European chain of protected sites called the Emerald Network that are home to many endangered species. Preliminary assessment shows that more than 1.24 million hectares (3.1 million acres) of protected sites in Ukraine (that is, more than a third) were affected by war. According to the Ukraine Nature Conservation Society, more than 44% of the most valuable natural areas of Ukraine are covered by war.

Russian troops have dug trenches in nature reserves, built fortifications, and planted and exploded mines. In the Grand Meadow National Nature Park Russian tanks moved through the fields of endangered spring meadow saffron that had been part of a conservation program for 16 years. Fighting near Kherson in the Black Sea Biosphere Reserve was so intense that the fires were seen from space.

Meotyda National Nature Park near Mariupol is a habitat and nesting place of many endangered birds, including the Dalmatian pelican and the Pallas's gull. Fighting in forest reserves of the Kinburn Spit lasted more than a week, and caused irreparable damage to the local ecosystem. Dzharylhach National Nature Park, home to many rare endemic herbs, and wild boars, foxes, and deer, became an active fighting zone; more than 56 kilometres (35 mi) of its shores were planted with mines. Also, the war forced many inspectors and environmentalists to leave their workplaces, disrupting the results of many decades-long conservation and biodiversity projects.

On 6 November 2023 the Ministry of Environmental Protection and Natural Resources of Ukraine reported that the Dzharylhach National Nature Park had been completely destroyed due to "Russian armed aggression" during the Russian occupation of Kherson Oblast.

=== Animals and birds ===
More than 70 thousand species of flora and fauna live in Ukraine, accounting for more than 35% of Europe's biodiversity. War directly affects local populations and also disrupts migration. Wild animals are killed by shelling and bombing; fires, explosions, and vibrations scare off the animals, force birds to leave their nests, and disrupt their food chain. When crossing rivers, heavy vehicles pollute waters with fuel and lubricants that poison insect larvae. The lower their number, the fewer frogs there will be, meaning no food for cranes. Fighting in spring, most species' breeding season, multiplies the damage.

During the annexation of Crimea by Russia in 2014, Russian troops landed and moved through the protected lands of the Kryva Kosa nature reserve, destroying nests of the red book listed Pallas's gull. Because of the bombings, in 2022 only 300 Dalmatian pelicans instead of the usual 1500 migrated through the Kryva Kosa. In just the first three months of the war 200 bombs were dropped onto Tuzly Lagoons.

Conservationists of the Tuzly Lagoons National Nature Park led a 30-year project to restore the connection between coastal lagoons and the Black Sea. The natural rivulets that serve as a migration route for billions of small fish to breeding areas were dried up by industrial agriculture. Every spring the employees dug shallow channels to substitute them. In 2022 the coast was laced with mines and the employees had to leave, no digging of channels meant no migration routes for fish, no food base for a 5000 strong population of herons, resulting in a ruined ecosystem.

Dolphins are one of the most affected species. Hundred of dead animals were spotted along the shores of Ukraine, Turkey, Romania, and Bulgaria. It is possible that dolphins died from heavy metal poisoning, explosions, acoustic trauma or disorientation caused by unprecedented noise pollution from military sonars, although the exact cause of the 2022 strandings is not entirely clear and may be polyfactorial. Mechanical injuries and burns were spotted on some of the bodies. Tuzly Parks' director Ivan Rusev estimates the number of dead dolphins at several thousand.

In July 2026, FrontLinerUA said that researchers at Ukraine's Tuzly Lagoons National Nature Park found 22 dead dolphins in a single day along the Odesa region coastline, with similar reports from Bulgaria and Romania. According to FrontLiner, over 50,000 dolphins are believed to have died since Russia launched the 2022 full-scale war. Causes of the deaths include powerful sonar used by Russian vessels which disrupt the echolocation the animals rely on as well as causing acoustic stress, chemical contamination, debris from drones and missiles, damage to coastal infrastructure and the 2023 destruction of the Kakhovka Dam.

Domestic animals suffer as well. Before the war, there were more than 3.5 million cattle, 5.7 million pigs, and 212 million poultry in Ukraine. These farm animals are hard to relocate, so were often abandoned by owners. Cats and dogs (Note: More than 8 million pet cats and dogs lived in Ukraine in early 2022.) are more frequently taken with evacuated owners, however most are left in war affected areas. Sometimes wildlife returns to the areas deserted by humans. For instance, in the Donetsk region, populations of wolves, foxes and wild dogs grew significantly after 2014, which became frequent spreaders of rabies. A spike of cases has been recorded among local people.

Wild boars and deer returned to urban parks in Kharkiv due to the displacement of the human population. The population of sparrows in the city sharply dropped due to their reliance on human food waste.

== Indirect environmental impacts due to sanctions ==
When the war started, most international foundations and organisations ceased partnerships with Russia in environmental projects, international studies of climate change in the Arctic were disrupted. In Ukraine, almost all conservation projects were disrupted. The 2021 wildfires in Turkey, Europe, and Siberia, were mostly extinguished by Russian military aircraft. However, in 2022 due to sanctions it was impossible to make such contracts. Even inside Russia, where usually the military help with wildfires, there are no spare because of the war. In combination with an unprecedented heatwave, it can lead to disastrous consequences.

=== Energy transition ===
However, the war in Ukraine may also hasten the energy transition. In March 2022, Europe paid Russia approximately 640 million euros daily for oil and gas, and the country's revenues from hydrocarbon exports accounted for more than 40% of its budget. UN secretary António Guterres urged all nations "to put the pedal to the metal towards a renewable energy future" and called trying to fill any fossil fuel supply gaps with gas and coal "mutually assured destruction". Many experts agree that a switch to sustainable energy sources may be more swift and cost-effective than, for instance, building new gas pipelines and terminals.

Meanwhile, some are sceptical and almost sure that this war will disrupt all efforts towards the Paris Agreement goals. CO_{2} emissions will increase if some governments decide to replace Russian fossil fuels with imports from other countries and fill the gap with coal energy. Building new supply chains, new logistics and infrastructure in an attempt to replace Russian hydrocarbons will almost surely lock the world into irreversible warming. Increasing domestic fossil fuels can be presented as a patriotic act for reducing dependence on Russia's fossil fuels. Resources and attention can be diverted from the climate to the military. The military industry is so emissions intensive that the emissions of the American army exceed those of Sweden, Portugal or Denmark, therefore increasing military spendings will increase energy and materials consumption. War also hurt international cooperation, crucial for climate action. The head of the UN António Guterres said that the impact of the war on the energy transition, can lead to destruction from climate change. According to Guterres: “Countries could become so consumed by the immediate fossil fuel supply gap that they neglect or knee-cap policies to cut fossil fuel use”.

The war in Ukraine has severely disrupted climate policy all over the world and increased CO_{2} emissions.

In Europe the war contributed to significant increase in new projects linked to natural gas. The projects could lead to emissions almost equal to those of all existing coal plants.

In 2023, many Asian countries have been forced to return to using coal to keep up with energy demands caused by the heat wave in the region, due to the European boycott of Russian oil reducing the availability of liquefied natural gas (LNG). Bloomberg News reported that Russia exported 7.6 million tonnes (17 billion pounds) of coal to Asia in April, with India and China buying over two-thirds.

In the second decade of the 21st century, China took some steps to reduce emissions including decreasing coal use, and it was suggested it will peak emissions in 2022. Due to problems with energy supply in 2022, China has begun to approve new coal plants. By the middle of 2023 it approved so much that,

unless permitting is stopped immediately, China won't be able to reduce coal-fired power capacity during the 15th five-year plan (2026–30) without subsequent cancellations of already permitted projects or massive early retirement of existing plants.

China began to build half of the plants approved in 2022 by the summer of 2023. One of the reasons was the war in Ukraine that led to instability in energy supply including rising prices for metals like lithium.

The war led to a significant increase in sales of discounted Russian oil to India and China, and generally made Russian oil more attractive to BRICS countries. The sanctions created "lower invoice prices for Russian goods" to countries that buy it. Brazil has also increased its oil, gasoline and naphtha imports from Russia, which has lowered the diesel price by $10–$15 per barrel ($63–$94/m^{3}).

In 2022, the USA experienced a fracking boom when the war in Ukraine led to a massive increase in approval of new drillings. According to the article in The Guardian, "there is significant political pressure to increase domestic drilling in response to the Russia-Ukraine war". Planned drillings will release 140 billion tonnes (310 trillion pounds) of carbon, four times more than annual global emissions.

Fatih Birol, the head of the International Energy Agency talking about the prospects of COP 28 noted:

the geopolitical situation, with many nations at loggerheads over the war in Ukraine, and still frosty relations between the US and China, would make for a difficult summit. [...] The most important challenge [to limiting temperature rises to 1.5 °C (2.7 °F) above pre-industrial levels] is the lack of international cooperation.

=== Environmental legislation ===
After 24 February 2022, many potentially hazardous amendments were made to Russian environmental law. For example, construction is now permitted in nature reserves, emissions norms are decreased, Russian car manufacturers are now allowed to produce models regardless of European eco standards, and an environmental impact assessment will not be needed from businesses in the next two years. The state program called Clean Air was also postponed for two years.

Cleaning up war-related pollution is a difficult task: it depends on many factors, such as soil pH, microorganisms' activity, and local temperature.

== Prosecution ==
The Ukrainian government, international observers and journalists have described the damage as ecocide. The Ukrainian government is investigating more than 200 war crimes against the environment and 15 incidents of ecocide (a crime in Ukraine). Ukrainian officials state that they are planning to gain the support of the international community to make Russia pay for reconstruction and recovery. Based on a preliminary assessment the war has inflicted US$51 billion in environmental damage.

Zelenskyy and Ukraine's prosecutor general Andriy Kosti have met with prominent European figures (such as Margot Wallstrom, Heidi Hautala, Mary Robinson and Greta Thunberg) to discuss the environmental damage and how to prosecute it.

== See also ==
- 2026 Tuapse environmental disaster
- 2026 Perm environmental disaster
- Environmental impact of the Russian occupation of Crimea
- Weather events during wars
- Destruction of the Kozarovytska Dam
- Destruction of the Kakhovka Dam
- Environmental impact of war
- War and environmental law
- Climate Change 2022: Impacts, Adaptation & Vulnerability (UN IPCC AR6 WGII & WGIII reports)

== Sources ==
- Hook, Kristina; Marcantonio, Richard (2022-01-18). "Environmental dimensions of conflict and paralyzed responses: the ongoing case of Ukraine and future implications for urban warfare". Small Wars & Insurgencies. 34 (8): 1400–1428. doi:10.1080/09592318.2022.2035098. S2CID 246831487.
- Hrytsku, Veronika; Derii, Zhenna (2022-06-08). "Ecological consequences of war in Ukraine". Present Environment and Sustainable Development.
- Gardashuk, Tetiana (2022-06-24). "Is Russian Aggression in Ukraine Ecocide?". Envigogika. 17 (1). doi:10.14712/18023061.642. S2CID 250042111.
- Lima, D.; Bezerra, M.; Neves, E.; Moreira, Fatima (2011). "Impact of ammunition and military explosives on human health and the environment". Reviews on Environmental Health. 26 (2): 101–110. doi:10.1515/reveh.2011.014. PMID 21905453. S2CID 27988637.
- Dathan, Jennifer (2020). "The environmental consequences of explosive weapon use" (PDF). Action on Armed Violence. Government of Norway, Ministry of Foreign Affairs.
- Ana, G.R.E.E.; Sridhar, M.K.C. (2007-02-27). "Bomb explosions, environment and health: a Nigerian experience". Disaster Prevention and Management. 16 (1): 6–14. Bibcode:2007DisPM..16....6A. doi:10.1108/09653560710729767. ISSN 0965-3562.
- Nikolaieva, I.; Averin, D.; Lystopad, O. (2020-11-06). "Witnessing the Environmental Impacts of War". Pax for Peace.
- Nikolaieva, I.; Nikolaieva, H.; Lobodzinskyi, O. (2019). Research of the Donbass tailings storage facilities current state and their possible emergency impact onwater bodies under the military actions (PDF) (Report).
