= Yukiko Kato =

Japanese novelist (1936–2024)

- 加藤幸子
- Born: Yukiko Shiraki; September 26, 1936; Sapporo, Japan
- Died: March 30, 2024 (aged 87)
- Education: Hokkaido University
- Occupation: Writer
- Writing career
- Language: Japanese
- Notable work: Yume no Kabe

Yukiko Kato (加藤幸子; September 26, 1936 – March 30, 2024) was a Japanese writer. She is best known for writing Yume no Kabe (夢の壁), which won the 1982 Akutagawa Prize.

== Biography ==
Kato was born Yukiko Shiraki in Sapporo, Japan on September 26, 1936. Her father was a university professor from Tokyo; he and Kato's mother were in Sapporo for work. The family lived in Beijing from 1941 to 1947. They returned to Tokyo after World War II. Kato returned to Hokkaido to attend university, and graduated with an agriculture degree from Hokkaido University in 1959. After graduation she worked for the Ministry of Agriculture and Forestry and the Nature Conservation Society of Japan.

Kato began her writing career after leaving public service. Her first story was published in 1981. Her next story, Nogaki no ita Mura (野餓鬼のいた村), which was published in 1982, won the Shincho Prize for New Writers. In the same year Kato won the Akutagawa Prize for Yume no Kabe (夢の壁). She won the Geijutsu Senshō Award for Osaki Midori no Kankaku Sekai (尾崎翠の感覚世界) in 1991. Some of her works, like Yume no Kabe, take inspiration from her time in Beijing at the end of World War II. Her short stories also reflect on the relationship between humans and nature.

Kato died of heart failure on March 30, 2024, at the age of 87.

== Selected works ==
- Nogaki no ita Mura (野餓鬼のいた村) 1982
- Yume no Kabe (夢の壁) 1982
- Osaki Midori no Kankaku Sekai (尾崎翠の感覚世界) 1991
- Yume no Kodomotachi (夢の子供たち) 2000
