= Environmental impact of the Russian occupation of Crimea =

Environmental consequences caused by the 2014 Russian annexation of Crimea

Crimea is home to 6 of Ukraine's 19 nature reserves, the most valuable category of nature reserves. The Russian occupation of Crimea that began in 2014 affected the environment of the region.

The administrations of all reserves are subordinated to state institutions of Ukraine: the Ministry of Ecology and Natural Resources of Ukraine (Kazantip and Opuk Nature Reserves (hereinafter - PZ), Charivna Havan National Nature Park), the State Forest Resources Agency (Crimean Nature Reserve and Yalta Mountain-Forest Nature Reserve), National Academy of Sciences of Ukraine (Karadazhsky PZ) and the Academy of Agrarian Sciences (PZ "Cape Martian"). According to Russian law, reserves and national parks must be subordinated directly to the Ministry of Environment of Russia.

== History ==
On March 26, 2014, the Government of the Republic of Crimea decided to nationalise the reserves and on March 27 a press conference was held in Simferopol on this occasion by the Chairman of the Republican Committee for Environmental Protection (Reskomprirody) Gennady Narayev. "RK" does not agree to transfer the reserves under Moscow's jurisdiction.

In all subsequent documents, the position of the leadership of Republic of Crimea had a clear vector for the use of natural and primarily recreational resources of the Crimean reserves. Thus, on April 4, 2014, an order was signed, according to which visits to reserves and national parks, passage of tourist trails of the Crimea will be free until the creation of a structure that will deal with the administration of revenues . The Republic of Crimea did not create a separate body to manage the reserves. However, on a par with forestries, reserves are subordinated to the Republican Forestry Committee (Reskomlis).

On August 25, 2014, the head of the State Council of Crimea V. Konstantinov said that the issue of abolishing the Opuk and Kazantip reserves is being considered, as local residents of the Leninsky district appealed to the "Crimean authorities" to do so. According to him - "residents were left without traditional grazing places". It is important to recall that both reserves were established long ago, after losing their defensive significance with the collapse of the USSR. "Traditional grazing places" could not be here for at least 70 years. However, it is more important to understand that almost the entire area of these reserves is occupied by marine waters and steep cliffs above the sea - not the best place for grazing, unlike the endless steppes of the Kerch Peninsula capes which created these reserves.

On June 4, 2014, the Council of Ministers of the Republic of Crimea issued Order No. 464-r "On the transfer of real estate for free use to the Office of the President of the Russian Federation". The list includes various sanatoriums, residences, boarding houses, and at the very end - the Crimean Nature Reserve. In October 2014, the Crimean Nature Reserve was transferred to the Federal Budget Institution "Crimean Complex", which is part of the Office of the President of the Russian Federation, thus restoring the former (Soviet-era) status of the State Reserve .

In January 2015, the Council of Ministers of the Republic of Crimea clarified the list of reserves transferred to the Reskomlis. They were Opuk, Kazantip, Yalta and Karadag reserves - as budgetary institutions, and NPP "Tarkhankut". The Cape Martian Nature Reserve has not yet determined the status of the self-proclaimed Republic of Crimea. In turn, Reskomlis declared part of the NPF, regardless of the category - "recreational facilities" and set a differentiated fee for entry into their territory. Paid tourism in reserves and sanctuaries is actively promoted by the Crimean media. The cost of entry into the reserve is estimated at 60 to 100 Russian rubles for adults and up to 60 - for children; setting up a tent - 100 rubles, bus fare - 150 rubles, car - 70 rubles. In the Yalta Reserve, which can not be visited at all - in different parts of the cost of visiting notable sites - from 50 to 100 rubles. In the Karadag Reserve services range from 50 to 450 rubles .; in Opuk - 200, Kazantip - 150 rubles. The introduction of paid services in the reserves proved to be an attempt to convert them to self-sufficiency. However, there were no vacationers in the annexed Crimea as such, so the reserves could not make a profit, but could not even provide for themselves. Given the general economic crisis, in July 2015 the Ministry of Ecology of the Republic of Crimea resumed negotiations with the Ministry of Environment of the Russian Federation on the transfer of reserves to federal subordination with appropriate funding from their administrations directly from Moscow.

However, today there are reasons to fear that the protected areas of Crimea may expect much more radical reforms. It is known that in 2015, the Open Joint-Stock Company Giprogor Russian Institute of Urban and Investment Development developed the Scheme of Spatial Planning of the Republic of Crimea. A similar document was developed for all other subjects of Russia. This document is today the only confirmation of many alarming rumors about the possible abolition of the Crimean protected areas and the possible deployment of Russian military bases on their territory. In the "Scheme of Spatial Planning серед" among the problems of nature reserves is the presence of natural aqua complexes - part of the marine waters of Crimea, which in the Ukrainian legislative field are classified as natural monuments of local importance. In Russian law, all marine waters are areas of federal subordination, which requires a change of category or subordination of these objects. The text of the document twice contains the sentence "Based on the interests of the Russian Federation in the field of defense and security, the boundaries of protected areas can be adjusted," and one of these remarks relates to coastal and aquatic complexes. Thus, the object of special attention of the document is the protected status of coastal areas with adjacent waters, where the location of military facilities is strategic.

== See also ==
- Environmental impact of the 2022 Russian invasion of Ukraine
- International Day for Preventing the Exploitation of the Environment in War and Armed Conflict
- Russo-Ukrainian War

== Related literature ==
- Василюк О. та ін. Довкілля Криму: зміни і втрати за час окупації. Частина І. Знищення дикої природи. К.: КримSOS, 2021.128 c.
- Василюк О. та ін. Довкілля Криму: зміни і втрати за час окупації. Частина ІІ. Забруднення довкілля та виснаження природних ресурсів. — Київ: ГО «КРИМСОС», 2021. — 49 с.
