= List of industry trade groups in Ukraine =

Ukrainian industry trade groups

This is a list of known industry trade groups located in Ukraine.

- Ukrainian Association of Press Publishers
- Independent Regional Publishers of Ukraine
- National Journalists Society of Ukraine
- National Writers Society of Ukraine
- National [Visual] Artists Society of Ukraine
- Ukrainian Union of Industrialists and Entrepreneurs
  - All-Ukrainian association of publishers and distributors of press
- All-Ukrainian Association of Museums
- Ukrainian Red Cross Society
- Lawyers Union of Ukraine
- Geologists Society of Ukraine
- Christian Writers Society of Ukraine
- Fishermen Community of Ukraine
- Employers Federation of Ukraine
- Ukrainian Union of NSMEP participants
- Ukraine Nature Conservation Society
- Ukrainian Notary Chamber
- Ukrainian Builders Association (UBA)
- Ukrainian Association of Weapon Owners
