= Prypiat–Stokhid National Nature Park =

National park in Ukraine

- Ukrainian: Національний природний парк «Прип'ять-Стохід»
- IUCN category II (national park)
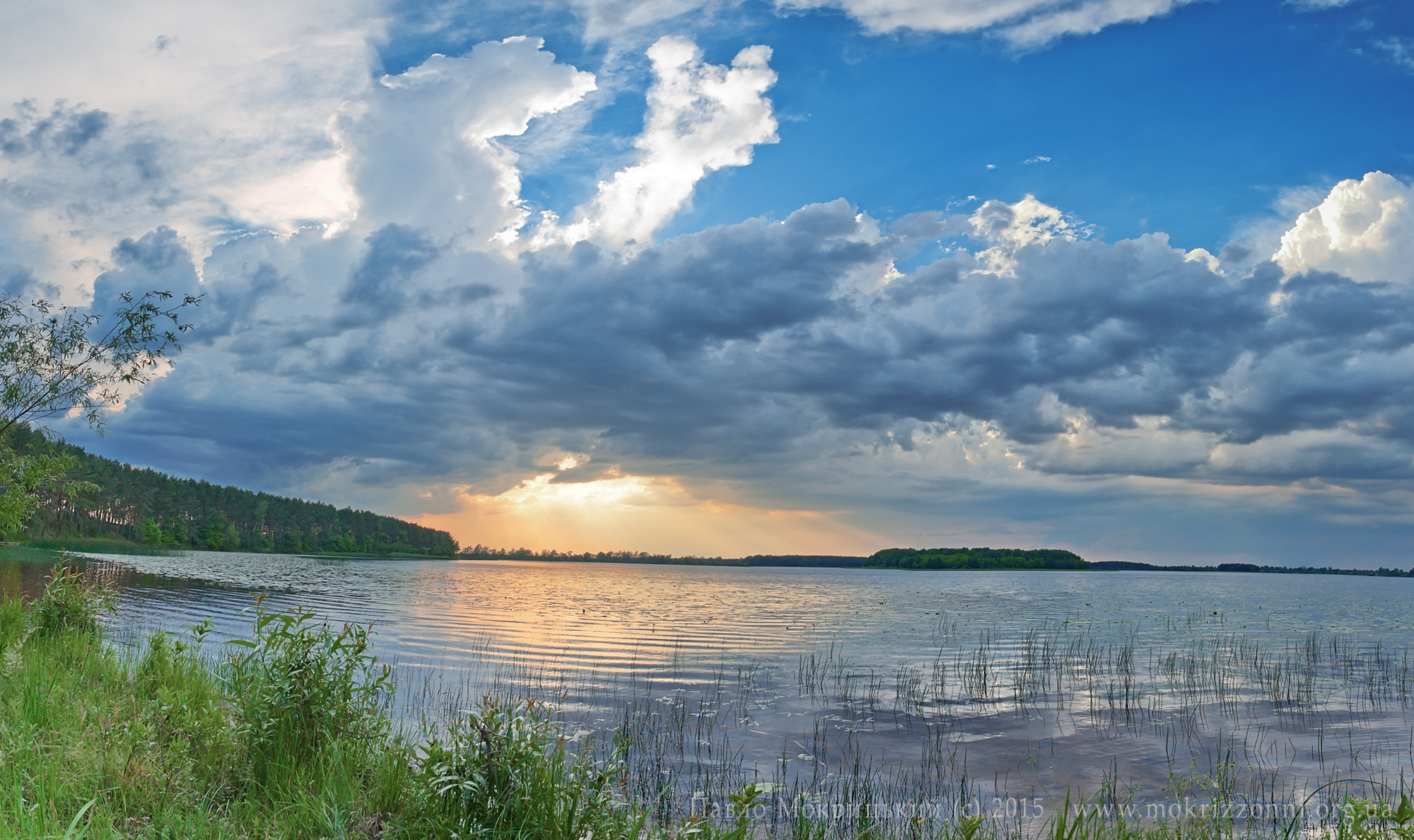
- Prypiat–Stokhid National Nature Park

- Location within Ukraine
- Location: Volyn Oblast, Liubeshiv Raion
- Nearest city: Liubeshiv
- Coordinates: 51.82833333°N 25.2825°E
- Area: 39,315.5 hectares (97,151 acres; 393 km^{2}; 152 sq mi)
- Established: 2007
- Governing body: Ministry of Ecology and Natural Resources
- Website: http://www.pripyat-stohid.com.ua/

The Prypiat–Stokhid National Nature Park (Ukrainian: Національний природний парк «Прип'ять-Стохід») was created in 2007 to protect and unify a series of natural complexes of the Pripyat River and Stokhid River valleys in northwestern Ukraine. The park provides protection, research areas, and recreation representative of the meadows and wetlands of the Polissia biosphere region. The park supports two Ramsar wetlands of international importance, and are joined in a cross-boundary Ramsar wetland with Belarus. The park is in the administrative district of Liubeshiv in Volyn Oblast.

== Topography ==
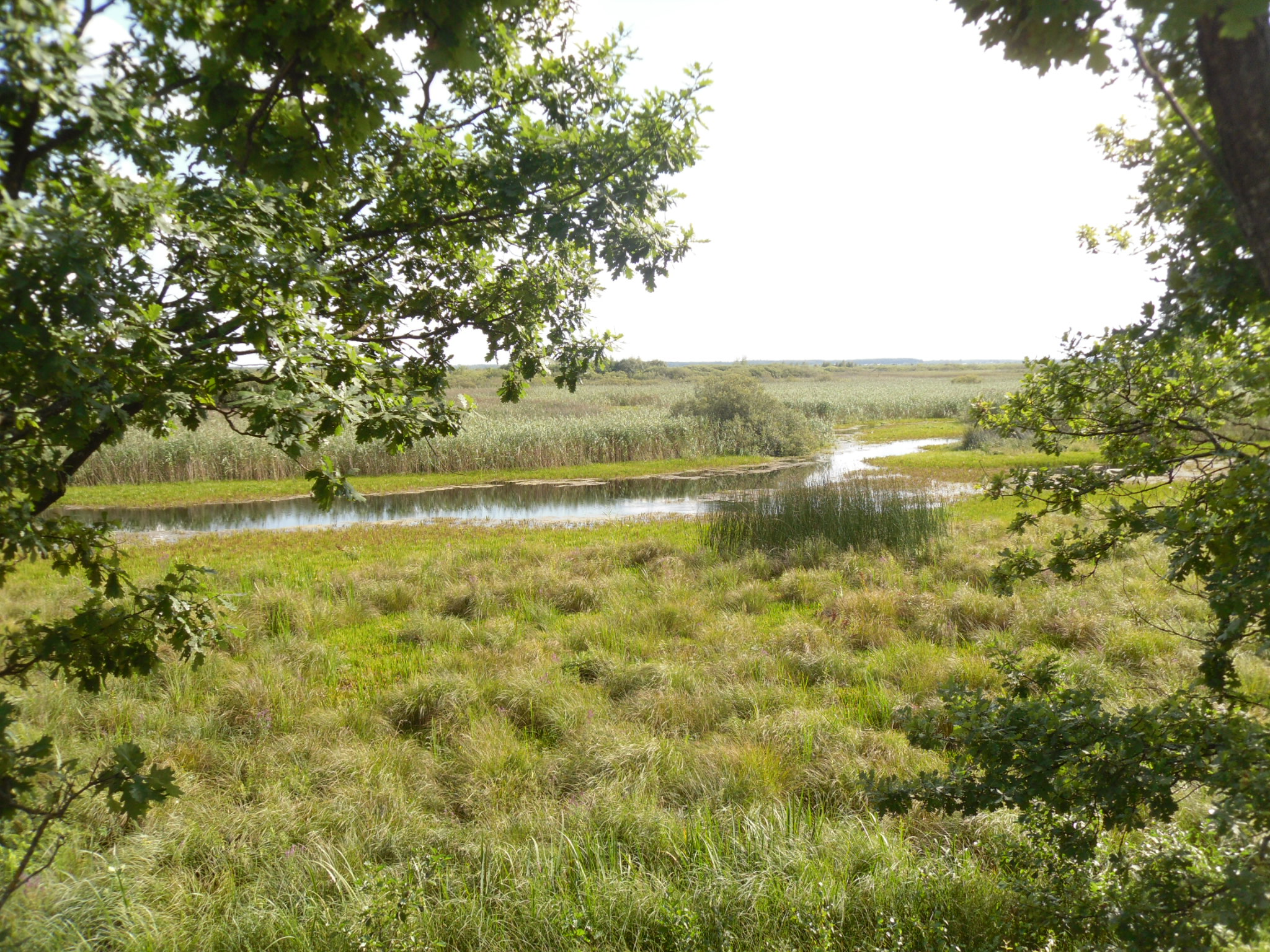
Prypyat River floodplain in the park

The topography is flat wetlands along the Prypyat and Stokhid rivers. This is suggested by the name of the Stokhid, which means "river of one hundred moves". The site runs along the border with Belarus to the north. Downstream, the filtered waters of the area feed into the Dnieper River and through the middle of Ukraine. The outer boundaries form a shape long and thin, running west-to-east for 50 km, and north–south an average of 10 km.

== Climate and ecoregion ==
The climate of Prypiat-Stokhid is humid continental climate, warm summer (Köppen climate classification (Dfb)). This climate is characterized by large seasonal temperature differentials and a warm summer (at least four months averaging over 10 °C (50 °F), but no month averaging over 22 °C (72 °F). Precipitation in the park is about 600 millimetres (24 in) per year.

Prypiat-Stokhid NNP is located in the Central European mixed forests ecoregion, a temperate hardwood forest covering much of northeastern Europe, from Germany to Russia.

== Flora and fauna ==
Bogs cover 43% of the park, forests and bottom land 35%, shrub land 16%, and 6% water. Because of the rich diversity of habitats – swamps, bogs, peatlands, riverine islands, etc. – the park exhibits great biodiversity, including over 800 species of higher plants and 220 vertebrate species, including 60 species of mammals and 220 species of birds. Over 150,000 waterfowl are recorded during the annual migration.

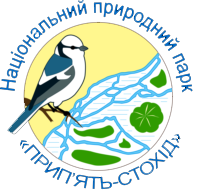
Park logo

== Public use ==
Bicycle routes encircle the park, making for journeys of 1 to 5 days, and an extensive network of hiking trails for day trips or multi-day guided excursions. The park sponsors "green rural tourism", which includes the ability to visit rural villages in the area or rent a rural farm. There are two water tour routes with guided tours in kayaks and small boats.

== See also ==
- National parks of Ukraine
