= Lyudmyla Suhak =

Ukrainian Minister of Justice

- Людмила Сугак
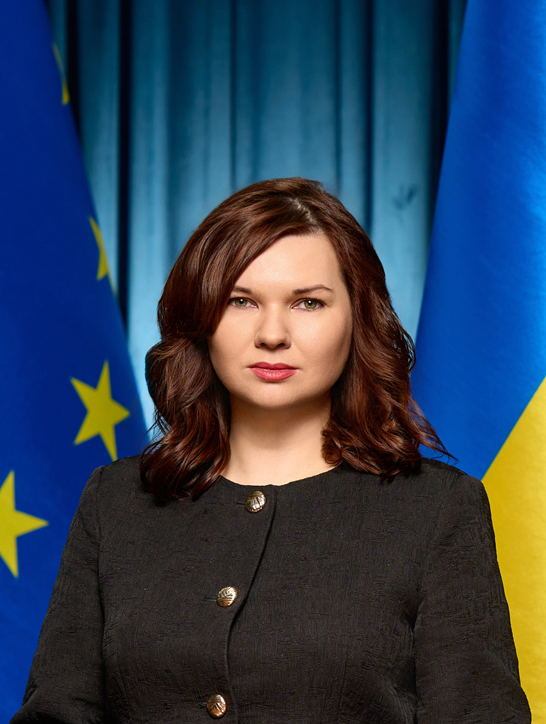
- Suhak in 2025

Acting Minister of Justice
- In office 19 November 2025 – 16 July 2026
- President: Volodymyr Zelenskyy
- Prime Minister: Yulia Svyrydenko
- Preceded by: German Galushchenko
- Succeeded by: Denys Maslov

Deputy Minister of Justice of Ukraine for European Integration
- In office 27 June 2023 – 16 July 2026
- President: Volodymyr Zelenskyy
- Prime Minister: Denys Shmyhal; Yulia Svyrydenko
- Preceded by: Valeria Kolomiets

Personal details
- Born: 6 January 1987 (age 39) Bershad, Ukrainian SSR, Soviet Union
- Party: Independent
- Education: Taras Shevchenko National University of Kyiv

Lyudmyla Petrivna Suhak (Ukrainian: Людмила Петрівна Сугак; born 6 January 1987) is a Ukrainian lawyer and politician, who served as former Deputy Minister of Justice of Ukraine for European Integration, and served as Acting Minister of Justice from 19 November 2025 to 16 July 2026.

== Biography ==
Lyudmyla Petrivna Suhak was born on 6 January 1987 in the town of Bershad in the Vinnytsia region.

In 2008, she graduated from Taras Shevchenko National University of Kyiv with a Bachelor’s degree in International Relations; in 2010, she obtained a Master’s degree in International Law.

From December 2006 to September 2008, she was a lawyer at the Interregional Legal Union LLC. From October 2008 to July 2010, she served as a specialist in the executive office of the Kyiv Oblast Council. In 2013–2014, she was an assistant and advisor to Volodymyr Vecherko, a Member of the Verkhovna Rada of the Party of Regions.

From February 2014 to May 2017, she was Head of the Department for European Integration and Legal Cooperation with International Organisations at the Ministry of Justice of Ukraine.

From May 2017 to July 2023, she headed the Asset Recovery and Management Agency (ARMA). On 5 July 2023, she became Deputy Minister of Justice for European Integration.

On 19 November 2025, she was appointed Acting Minister of Justice of Ukraine, succeeding German Galushchenko in the post.

== Gallery ==
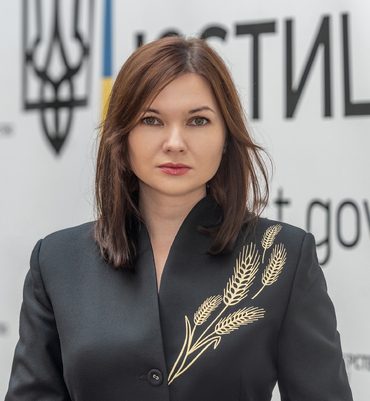
Suhak in 2023 as Deputy Minister of Justice for European Integration

== See also ==
- Operation Midas
