= Ukraine Nature Conservation Society =

Non-governmental environmental organization

- Formation: June 28, 1946; 80 years ago
- Headquarters: Kyiv, Ukraine
- President of the Board of the Pan-Ukrainian Council: Vasyl Shevchuk
- Website: www.ukrpryroda.org

Ukraine Nature Conservation Society (Ukrainian: Укрприрода – Українське товариство охорони природи, romanized: Ukrpryroda – Ukrayinske tovarystvo okhorony pryrody) is a non-governmental environmental organization, foundation of which was one of precursors of the Khrushchev thaw during his time in Ukraine.

In 1967, following Ukrpryroda's advocacy arguments, the Ukrainian Government founded the State Nature Protection Committee that had a status of a central government agency. This took place three years before Nixon established the EPA in the US, six years before the European Commission created an Environmental and Consumer Protection Directorate and 21 years before Gorbachev established a similar Soviet-wide agency in Moscow. The State Nature Protection Committee was upgraded to the ministerial status in 1991.

Ukrpryroda promotes public awareness of recycling, environmental education and the love for nature at schools, in local communities and among local authorities. It has branches in all the regions and most of the regional districts/municipalities as well as in the special-status cities of Kyiv and Sevastopol.

== History ==
Ukraine Nature Conservation Society (Ukrpryroda) was founded on June 28, 1946 during an environmental disaster - a drought that triggered a famine. It has a fascinating history of struggle of the founders of the Ukrainian environmental movement. Nikita Khrushchev (then the Head of the Government of the Ukrainian SSR and the Communist Party) gave permission for establishment of Ukrpryroda in response to numerous appeals of Ukrainian scientists and conservationists, many of whom were academics. Up until the mid-1960s, Ukrpryroda was the only voice for environment in draft public policy decisions, working closely with the Planning Commission and other government bodies. At that time Ukrpryroda requested the introduction of a comprehensive ecological-economic approach to the planned economy and promoted the establishment of the Ministry of Environment within the Ukrainian Government.

It was not easy to assert environmental rights in the absence of democracy even by Ukraine's famous scientists. However, giving in to the pressure of Ukrpryroda, the Government created the State Nature Protection Committee as a central government agency in 1967. Professor Mykhailo Voinstvenskiy was the Chairperson of Ukrpryroda in 1963–1982. In 1971, Professor Stepan Stoyko, the head of Ukrpryroda's Lviv branch, hired Viacheslav Chornovil who had been previously imprisoned for political beliefs.

During the era of stagnation and the subsequent perestroika, Ukrpryroda focused on environmental education, particularly among high school/university students and senior citizens, mobilizing them to participate in community service days. Ukrpryroda's and other public voices on environmental issues were heard at the time when the State Nature Protection Committee was led by Dina Protsenko, the first woman in the world to be an environmental minister (in the office during 1978–1988). Only with Ukraine's independence, the status of the State Nature Protection Committee was elevated to the Ministry of Environment in 1991.

In December 1992, the Ministry of Justice re-registered Ukrpryroda's charter amended by its 9th Congress on November 21, 1991. In Ukrpryroda governance, the Congress establishes a Pan-Ukrainian Council and its Board that consist, in majority, of volunteers. One of the new goals became to leverage the civil society, exercising the legislative right for the public and NGOs to receive information on environmental disclosure, to be consulted and even to participate in pollution inspections and raids against poachers under certain circumstances.

== Structure ==
Ukrpryroda is a nonprofit organization. Its highest governing body is the Congress that is elected by Ukrpryroda volunteers every 5 years. Between Congress meetings, Ukrpryroda is governed by the Pan-Ukrainian Council and its Board chaired by the President.

23 regional (incl. Kyiv and Sevastopol) organizations of Ukrpryroda report to the Pan-Ukrainian Council. These regional organizations have 354 district and 70 local branches, which include 23,000 primary organizations (at schools and universities, etc.), more than 10,000 corporate members (sponsors, co-hosts of environmental events and community days) and over 2 million individual members / volunteers.

Vasyl Shevchuk, a former Environment Minister, has been the Chairperson of the Board of Ukrpryroda's Pan-Ukrainian Council since 2002.

== Activities ==
=== Participation in the dialogue with the government and politicians ===
Ukrpryroda stands for and promotes public and parliamentary control over the clean environment. It has been taking part in all of the parliamentary hearings on environmental and Chernobyl issues (in the Verkhovna Rada) and promotes the implementation of the Aarhus Convention and the Law of Ukraine on Environmental Audit.

Also Ukrpryroda proactively encourages the Ukrainian businesses to implement:
- the system of environmental and social risk management, in particular under the Equator Principles.
- Business models that promote sustainable development through energy and resource efficiency, sustainable land use and sustainable biodiversity conservation, business with partners who manage well their environmental and social risks, and a caring attitude toward employees and local communities.
- Principles of corporate social responsibility (CSR).

=== Sections of UUkrpryroda ===
Ukrpryroda's organizational system includes 10 national and 140 regional thematic sections. Their issue can be divided into mobilization of scientific research, advocacy and public policy. Among substantive issues for research are environmental safety, protection and restoration of flora and fauna, minerals, water resources, atmosphere, land, fish stocks, forests and protected areas. Advocacy is taken on via the promotion and development of environmental youth movement as well as the promotion of legal rights, spreading environmental awareness among school and university students, population of regions. Sectional work on public policy includes legislative recommendations on protection and rational use of natural resources and implementing methodologies (through its scholarly members) to assist regional and local branches of Ukrpryroda.

=== Environmental activities in the regions ===
Members of Ukrpryroda take an active part in such international and national environmental actions, as World Environment Day, Earth Day, World Wetlands Day, “Clean Ukraine - Clean Earth” and such regional environmental actions as “A Primrose”, “A Spring”, “A Fir Tree”, “Clean Air”, “A Tomtit”, “A Swamp Turtle”, “A Spawning” and other ones.

It is important for Ukrpryroda to attract people to participation in environmental protection, performing a variety of regional and local environmental actions such as afforestation, planting trees in the urban areas, greening public places, cleaning river banks and lakes, liquidation of dumps, etc. Ukrpryroda's regional organizations initiate community service days where communities clean their territories.

=== Educational activities ===
Every year the Pan-Ukrainian Council together with the regional organizations of Ukrpryroda conducts targeted educational and public-awareness campaigns by organizing public lectures, weekend excursions, public movie/documentary watching, thematic exhibitions, open roundtables and seminars.

Also, Ukrpryroda reaches out through publications, particularly the nationwide popular-science magazine 'The Native Nature', 'The Shamrock' newspaper, many brochures, and sections in the local newspapers help regular appearances in the media.

== Partners and similar organizations around the world ==
Europe

- Austria: Naturschutzbund Österreich
- Denmark: Danish Society for Nature Conservation
- France: France nature environnement
- Germany: Naturschutzbund Deutschland
- Italy: Pro Natura
- Netherlands: Milieudefensie
- Norway: Norwegian Society for the Conservation of Nature
- Russia: Pan-Russian Nature Conservation Society
- Sweden: Swedish Society for Nature Conservation
- United Kingdom: Environmental Protection UK, British Ecological Society

Australia and Oceania

- Australia: Australian Conservation Foundation
- New Zealand: ECO

America

- Canada: Canadian Parks and Wilderness Society, Nature Canada
- Mexico: Pronatura
- United States: Sierra Club, The Nature Conservancy

Africa and the Middle East

- Ethiopia: Ethiopian Wildlife and Natural History Society
- Israel: Society for the Protection of Nature in Israel
- Kenya: Green Belt Movement
- Nigeria: Nigerian Conservation Foundation
- South Africa: Wildlife and Environment Society of South Africa
- UAE: Emirates Environmental Group

Asia

- China: China Wildlife Conservation Association
- India: Wildlife Trust of India
- Japan: Nature Conservation Society of Japan
- South Korea: Korean Society of Nature Conservation, Korean Association for Conservation of Nature, National Nature Trust, The Ecological Society of Korea
- Nepal: National Trust for Nature Conservation
- Vietnam: Vietnam Association for Conservation of Nature and Environment
