= Denys Maslov =

Ukrainian politician

- Денис Маслов
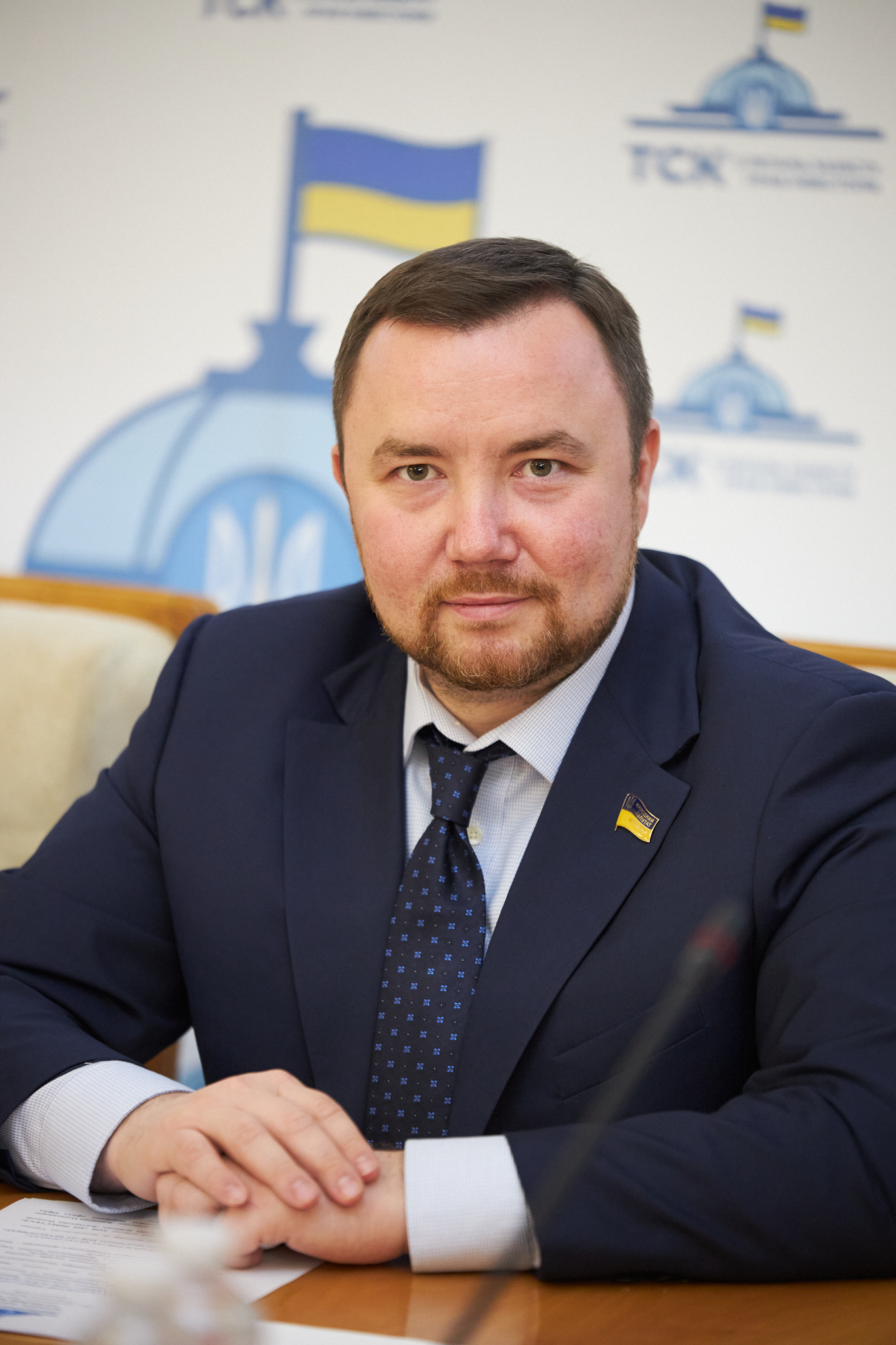
- Maslov in 2021

Minister of Justice
- Incumbent
- Assumed office 16 July 2026
- President: Volodymyr Zelenskyy
- Prime Minister: Serhii Koretskyi
- Preceded by: Lyudmyla Suhak

Chairman of the Verkhovna Rada of Ukraine Committee on Legal Policy
- In office 11 June 2020 – 16 July 2026
- President: Volodymyr Zelenskyy
- Preceded by: Andriy Kostin

People's Deputy of Ukraine
- In office 16 June 2020 – 16 July 2026
- President: Volodymyr Zelenskyy

Personal details
- Born: 1 August 1983 (age 43) Kryvyi Rih, Ukrainian SSR, Soviet Union
- Party: Servant of the People
- Education: Oles Honchar Dnipro National University
- Occupation: Politician; jurist; judge

Denys Viacheslavovych Maslov (Ukrainian: Денис Вячеславович Маслов; born 1 August 1983) is a Ukrainian judge, lawyer, politician, and the Minister of Justice of Ukraine since 16 July 2026.

Maslov was the Chairman of the Verkhovna Rada Committee on Legal Policy from July 2022 to July 2026.

== Biography ==
Maslov received a law and economic degree from the Oles Honchar Dnipro National University.

He was attorney at law (2010-2020) and a judge of the Dnipro district court of the city of Dniprodzerzhinsk (2016-2018).

In the 2019 Ukrainian presidential election, Maslov was a proxy for presidential candidate Volodymyr Zelenskyi in the single-mandate constituency 26 (located in Dnipro).

Maslov participated in the 2019 Ukrainian parliamentary election (placed 138th on the party list Servant of the People party).

On 11 June 2020, Maslov became a People's Deputy of the 9th Ukrainian Verkhovna Rada.

On 29 July 2022, Maslov was elected Chairman of the Verkhovna Rada Committee on Legal Policy.

Maslov is one of the lead authors of a group Draft Law in the field of judicial reform in Ukraine. He also supported the controversial 12414 Law against the independence of SAP and NABU.

== See also ==
- List of members of the parliament of Ukraine, 2019–24
