= Roman Abramovsky =

Ukrainian civil servant and politician

- Роман Абрамовський
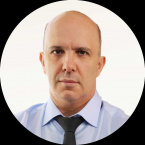

Minister of Environmental Protection and Natural Resources
- In office 19 June 2020 – 3 November 2021
- President: Volodymyr Zelenskyy
- Prime Minister: Denys Shmyhal
- Preceded by: Olha Buslavets (acting)
- Succeeded by: Ruslan Strilets (acting)

Personal details
- Born: 5 October 1973 (age 52) Komsomolsk-on-Amur, Khabarovsk Krai, Russian SFSR, Soviet Union (now Russia)
- Party: Independent
- Education: National Academy of Internal Affairs
- Occupation: Civil servant politician

Roman Romanovych Abramovsky (Ukrainian: Роман Романович Абрамовський; born 5 October 1973) is a Ukrainian civil servant and politician who served as Minister of Environmental Protection and Natural Resources of Ukraine from 19 June 2020 to 3 November 2021.

== Biography ==
In 2006, he graduated from the National Academy of Internal Affairs.

Abramovsky was a top manager of various enterprises.

From 2013 to 2014, he was an assistant to a People's Deputy of Ukraine.

In 2015, he worked as Deputy Minister of Regional Development.

From 2019 to 2020, Abramovsky served as Deputy Minister of Energy and Environmental Protection.

== See also ==
- Shmyhal Government
