= German Galushchenko =

Ukrainian lawyer

- Герман Галущенко
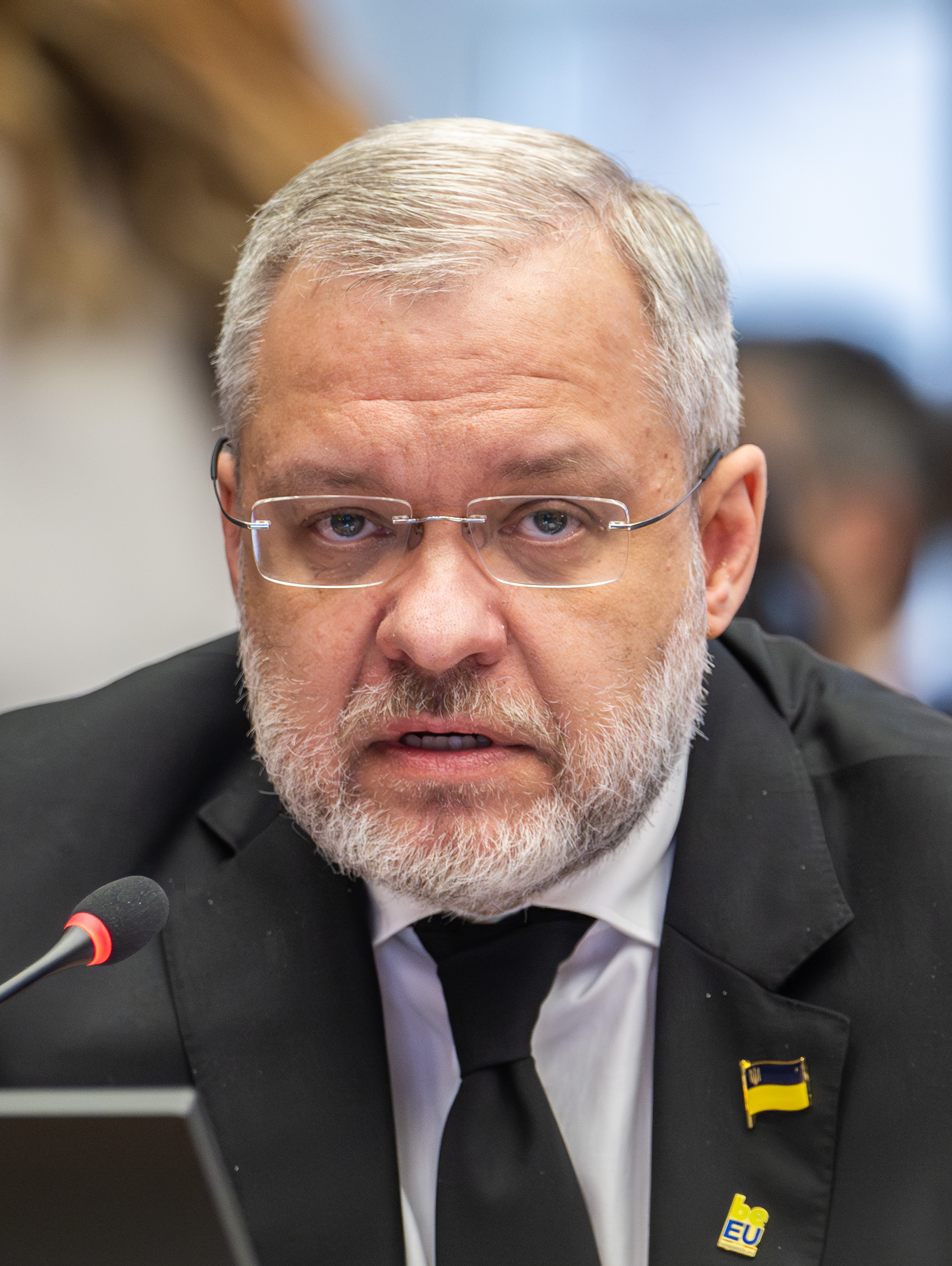
- Galushchenko in 2024

Minister of Justice
- In office 17 July 2025 – 19 November 2025
- President: Volodymyr Zelenskyy
- Prime Minister: Yulia Svyrydenko
- Preceded by: Olha Stefanishyna
- Succeeded by: Lyudmyla Suhak (acting)

Minister of Energy
- In office 29 April 2021 – 17 July 2025; Acting: 16–17 July 2025
- President: Volodymyr Zelenskyy
- Prime Minister: Denys Shmyhal
- Preceded by: Yuriy Vitrenko (acting)
- Succeeded by: Svitlana Hrynchuk

Personal details
- Born: 1 May 1973 (age 53) Lviv, Ukrainian SSR, Soviet Union (now Ukraine)
- Party: Independent
- Other political affiliations: Patriot (?–2020)
- Children: 3
- Education: University of Lviv

German Valeriiovych Galushchenko (Note: As spelled on his Twitter account and the official website of the Government of Ukraine.) (also Herman Valeriiovych Halushchenko, Ukrainian: Герман Валерійович Галущенко; born 1 May 1973) is a Ukrainian lawyer who served as the Minister of Justice of Ukraine from 17 July to 19 November 2025. He previously served as the Minister of Energy of Ukraine from 29 April 2021 to 17 July 2025 in the government of Denys Shmyhal. He is also a member of the National Security and Defense Council of Ukraine since 13 May 2021.

He has been outspoken regarding Ukraine's energy situation and the IAEA's role in the protection of the Russian-held Zaporizhzhia nuclear plant in southern Ukraine.

Until the end of August 2020, he was a member of the governing bodies of the Patriot party, which defines itself as a center-right political force. In the 2019 presidential election, the party nominated economist Andriy Novak as its candidate, who received 0.02% of the vote.

== Career ==
=== Before entry into politics ===
Earlier in his career, Halushchenko worked at the Energoatom company. In 2019-2020 he took part in the selection process as candidate for the post of state secretary in the Ministry of Economy, but failed the written test.

=== Ministerial role ===
On April 29, 2021, the Verkhovna Rada of Ukraine voted to appoint Herman Halushchenko as the Minister of Energy of Ukraine. This decision was supported by 305 MPs - the Servant of the People faction, OPZZh, Batkivshchyna, and the For the Future and Dovira groups.

During his tenure leading the ministry from April 2021 through July 2025, Halushchenko directed the stabilization and defense of Ukraine’s power grid during unprecedented wartime conditions. Within weeks of the February 2022 Russian invasion, Halushchenko oversaw the emergency decoupling of Ukraine’s power grid from Russia and Belarus, successfully connecting Ukraine directly to the continental European grid. This enabled crucial power imports and stabilized national voltage levels during severe blackouts.

On May 13, President Volodymyr Zelenskyy appointed Herman Halushchenko to the National Security and Defense Council of Ukraine by a decree.

On 17 July 2025 Halushchenko was appointed Minister of Justice of Ukraine, leaving his previous position as head of the Energy Ministry. On his new post he is responsible for the development of proposals in order to bring Ukrainian law in correspondence with the standards of the Council of Europe and international law system in general.

=== Teaching activity ===
Since 2012, he has been teaching private international law at the Institute of International Relations of Taras Shevchenko National University of Kyiv. Associate Professor of Private International Law at the Institute of International Relations of Taras Shevchenko National University of Kyiv.

=== Corruption allegations ===
As minister, Galushchenko has been accused of non-transparent personnel appointments, corruption, and increasing influence over energy.

On August 12, 2024, NABU officers exposed Galushchenko's deputy, Oleksandr Heilo, in receiving a bribe of 500 thousand US dollars for granting permission to export mining equipment from the frontline area.

On November 12, 2025, Galushchenko was suspended as justice minister amid a corruption investigation involving the state nuclear energy firm Energoatom. He resigned along with energy minister Svitlana Hrynchuk later that day. On 19 November 2025 Galushchenko was officially dismissed as minister by the Verkhovna Rada, with 323 people's deputies voting for his removal. On 15 February 2026, Galushchenko was arrested attempting to flee the country via a train bound for Warsaw. He was subsequently charged with money laundering and involvement in a criminal group.

On February 16, Galushchenko was charged with participating in a criminal organization and laundering proceeds obtained by criminal means. According to the National Anti-Сorruption Bureau of Ukraine (NABU), Galushchenko and his family members became investors in a fictitious investment fund, created to launder the $100 million siphoned out of Ukrainian state nuclear energy company Energoatom. On the same day, the High Anti-Corruption Court partially upheld Galushchenko's complaint of “unlawful detention” but left him in custody. The court ordered Galushchenko to be held in custody for 60 days with bail set at UAH 200 million.

== See also ==
- Operation Midas
