= Svitlana Hrynchuk =

Ukrainian politician (born 1985)

- Світлана Гринчук
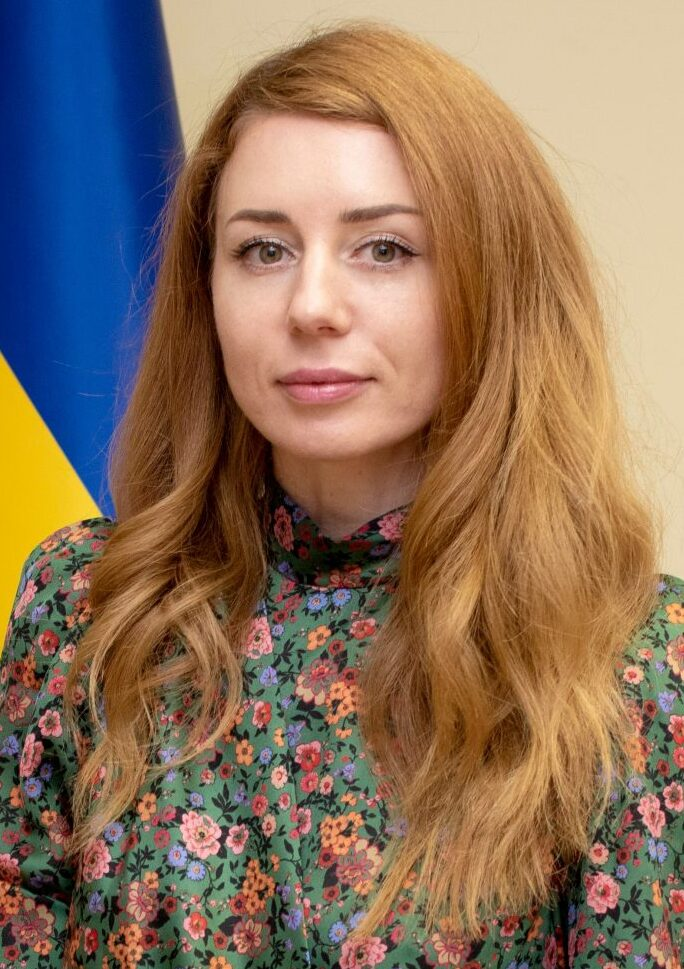
- Hrynchuk in 2025

Minister of Energy
- In office 17 July 2025 – 19 November 2025
- President: Volodymyr Zelenskyy
- Prime Minister: Yulia Svyrydenko
- Preceded by: Herman Halushchenko
- Succeeded by: Artem Nekrasov (acting)

Minister of Environmental Protection and Natural Resources
- In office 5 September 2024 – 17 July 2025; Acting: 16–17 July 2025
- President: Volodymyr Zelenskyy
- Prime Minister: Denys Shmyhal
- Preceded by: Ruslan Strilets
- Succeeded by: Oleksii Sobolev (as the Minister of Economy, Environment and Agriculture)

Personal details
- Born: 11 November 1985 (age 40) Chernivtsi, Ukraine, Soviet Union

Svitlana Vasylivna Hrynchuk (Ukrainian: Світлана Василівна Гринчук; born 11 November 1985) is a Ukrainian politician who served as the Minister of Energy of Ukraine from 17 July 2025 until 19 November 2025. Previously, she has served as the Minister of Environmental Protection and Natural Resources from 2024 to 2025 in the government of Denys Shmyhal. From 2023 to 2024, she served as Deputy Minister of Energy. From 2022 to 2023, she served as Deputy Minister of Environmental Protection and Natural Resources.

== Early life ==
Hrynchuk was born on 11 November 1985 in Chernivtsi, which was then part of the Ukrainian SSR. In 2008 she graduated from the Chernivtsi Institute of Trade and Economics at the State University of Trade and Economics. She then, in 2013, defended her Candidate of Sciences thesis in economics. Her thesis was on the development of mortgages in agriculture in Ukraine.

== Career ==
From 2016 to 2019 she was Director of the Department for Climate Change and Ozone Protection in the Ministry of Environment. In 2019 she became an adviser to the Prime Minister of Ukraine, advising on environmental protection and climate change issues. In 2020 she became an advisor to the Minister of Finance, who was Serhiy Marchenko at the time of her appointment. From 2022 to 2023 she was then Deputy Minister of Environmental Protection and Natural Resources, and then from 2023 to 2024 she was Deputy Minister of Energy.

== Corruption Investigation ==
On 12 November 2025, she resigned as energy minister along with justice minister German Galushchenko amid a corruption investigation involving the state nuclear energy firm Energoatom.

On 19 November 2025 Hrynchuk was officially dismissed as minister by the Verkhovna Rada, with 315 people's deputies voting for her removal.

== Personal life ==
She is married to Vyacheslav Hrynchuk, who is an entrepreneur in the operation of attractions and theme parks and the founder of the organization "Office of Independent Environmentalists". In 2022, Hrynchuk stopped mentioning him in official declarations. Together, they had one daughter, Yulia.

== See also ==
- Operation Midas
