= Committee of the Verkhovna Rada on issues of ecological policy =

- Committee of the Verkhovna Rada of Ukraine on Environmental Policy, Nature Resources Utilization and Elimination of the Consequences of Chornobyl Catastrophe

Committee overview
- Formed: June 28, 1990
- Jurisdiction: Ukraine
- Employees: 15 deputies
- Committee executive: vacant (since March 2016), Chairman
- Website: http://komekolog.rada.gov.ua/

The Committee of the Verkhovna Rada of Ukraine on Environmental Policy, Nature Resources Utilization and Elimination of the Consequences of Chornobyl Catastrophe (Ukrainian: Комітет з питань екологічної політики, природокористування та ліквідації наслідків Чорнобильської катастрофи, Komitet Verkhovnoi Rady Ukrainy z pytan’ ekolohichnoi polityky, pryrodokorystuvannia ta likvidatsii naslidkiv Chornobyl’s’koi katastrofy) is a standing committee of the Verkhovna Rada, Ukraine's unicameral parliament. The committee consists of 15 people's deputies in the parliament's 8th convocation. Its entire composition was approved on December 4, 2014.

== History ==
Legislative development of the environmental policy of the Ukrainian state began on July 16, 1990, with the adoption by the Verkhovna Rada of the Declaration of State Sovereignty of Ukraine. The Declaration states that the Ukrainian state independently establishes the procedure for organizing nature protection on the territory of the Republic and the procedure for using natural resources, has its own national commission for radiation protection, has the right to prohibit construction and cease operation of any enterprises, institutions, organizations and other facilities.

Officially the Committee was created on June 28, 1990 during the twelfth convocation of the Verkhovna Rada of the Ukrainian Soviet Socialist Republic (first convocation of the Verkhovna Rada of Ukraine) as the "Permanent Commission of the Verkhovna Rada of the Ukrainian SSR on issues of ecology and sustainable use of natural resources" (Ukrainian: Комісія у питаннях екології та раціонального природокористування). At the time, the commission of the Verkhovna Rada on issues of the Chornobyl disaster was a separate commission, which was merged with the commission on issues of ecology during the parliament's third convocation.

In June 1992, at the UN Conference on Environment and Development in Rio de Janeiro (Brazil), 155 states, including Ukraine, signed the UN Framework Convention on Climate Change. The Verkhovna Rada of Ukraine ratified this Convention on October 29, 1996.

Currently, Ukraine is a party to 20 global and regional environmental conventions and 5 additional protocols and amendments to the convention.

== Presidium ==
On December 4, 2014, the Committee of the Verkhovna Rada of Ukraine on issues of ecological policy's composition was approved by the Verkhovna Rada. Its presidium consists of five deputies:

Office	MP	Since	Party
Chairman	Post vacant		
First Deputy Chairman	Anatoliy Dyriv		People's Front
Deputy Chairman	Oleksiy Lenskyi		Radical Party of Oleh Lyashko
Deputy Chairman	Oleh Nedava		Petro Poroshenko Bloc
Secretary	Ostap Yednak		Self Reliance

== Scope ==
The Committee of the Verkhovna Rada on issues of ecological policy's scope is recognized as follows:

- protection, conservation, use, and recovery of natural resources, including mineral resources, forests, water, air, plant and animal wildlife, natural landscapes;
- conservation and sustainable use of natural resources of the maritime economic zone, the continental shelf, and space exploration;
- environmental safety, prevention and elimination of natural disasters, industrial accidents and disasters, the activities of public emergency services;
- radiation and fire safety;
- civil protection;
- legal regime of environmental emergency zones;
- state policy on waste, including radioactive and toxic waste;
- state monitoring of the environment;
- administrative and economic penalties for environmental pollution;
- creation, protection and development of natural reserve fund of Ukraine;
- terms of recovery, including consent to be bound by international treaties of Ukraine on these issues;
- social protection of citizens affected by the Chornobyl disaster;
- environmental insurance and environmental audits;

== Subcommittees ==
The Committee of the Verkhovna Rada on issues of ecological policy consists of the following subcommittees:

- Subcommittee on the protection and rational use of mineral and water resources
- Subcommittee on the forest resources of flora/fauna, landscapes and natural reserve fund
- Subcommittee on the state environmental monitoring
- Subcommittee on the public policy in the field of waste management
- Subcommittee on the Chornobyl, social protection of victims of the Chornobyl disaster
- Subcommittee on the civil protection and disaster relief of man-made or natural disasters

== See also ==
- Ministry of Ecology and Natural Resources, in the Cabinet of Ministers of Ukraine
