= Operation Midas =

Ukrainian corruption investigation (published 2025)

Operation Midas Операція «Мідас»
- Type: Anti-corruption investigation
- Scope: Ukraine

Participants
- Executed by: National Anti-Corruption Bureau of Ukraine; Specialized Anti-Corruption Prosecutor's Office
- Countries participating: Ukraine

Mission
- Target: Alleged criminal group led by Timur Mindich

Timeline
- Date begin: 2024 (beginning of the investigation); 10 November 2025 (first data published)

Results
- Suspects: At least 9 individuals

Operation Midas (Ukrainian: Операція «Мідас», romanized: Operacija "Midas") (also known as "Mindich-gate") is an anti-corruption investigation of the National Anti-Corruption Bureau of Ukraine (NABU) and the Specialized Anti-Corruption Prosecutor's Office (SAP) that was launched in 2024 and is ongoing as of November 2025. The investigation concerns large-scale bribery in the energy sector of Ukraine, committed during the Russo-Ukrainian war. During the data collection operation, which lasted 15 months, more than 70 searches were conducted, 4 million US dollars were seized and about 1,000 hours of audio recordings of the suspects' conversations were obtained.

Operation Midas is considered to be one of the most high-profile anti-corruption investigations in Ukraine since the beginning of the Russian invasion of Ukraine.

== Investigation ==
NABU takes an unorthodox public communications strategy and reveals information in "episodes" akin to a streaming series. The agency gave several suspects nicknames, such as "Che Guevara" or "Professor".

=== 10 November 2025 ===
On 10 November 2025, the National Anti-Corruption Bureau of Ukraine (NABU) conducted simultaneous searches of several high-ranking officials and businessmen. The investigation established that a corruption scheme was operating at the state-owned company Energoatom, the main operator of Ukrainian nuclear power plants, generating more than half of the country's electricity. Members of the suspected criminal group established control over Energoatom's procurement and systematically demanded kickbacks in the amount of 10–15% of the contract value. Suppliers who refused to pay had their payments for completed work blocked or were excluded from the list of contractors. Internally, the scheme was known as "Barrier" (Ukrainian: Шлагбаум, romanized: Shlahbaum). NABU characterized the group as a "high-level criminal community" in the energy and defense sectors, engaged in corruption, money laundering, and illegal enrichment.

Audio recordings of conversations between group members (using call signs) were released, in which they discussed kickback amounts and multi-billion dollar projects. In one of the published episodes, from September 2025, participants, dissatisfied with the $90,000 kickback from a 3 billion hryvnia contract, decide to postpone a new 4 billion hryvnia contract in order to increase the bribe from 10% to 15%. Group members also discussed kickbacks in the construction of protective structures for energy facilities. In parallel with official meetings on infrastructure protection, group members planned to increase their percentage of the construction of shelters at the Khmelnytskyi Nuclear Power Plant.

According to investigators, the group began operating after the 2022 Russian invasion of Ukraine, taking advantage of the confusion and urgency surrounding defense and energy procurement. The increase in residential electricity tariffs in 2023 significantly increased Energoatom's revenue, creating additional opportunities for theft.

One of the group's key figures, Ihor Myronyuk, served for over 10 years as an assistant to Andriy Derkach, a Ukrainian people's deputy turned Russian senator, accused of treason in Ukraine. An office linked to Derkach was used to launder funds, and the proceeds were siphoned off into cash through a network of shell companies, including in Moscow.

=== 11 November 2025 ===
On 11 November, the unnamed former Deputy Prime Minister was charged with illegal enrichment. A total of 5 people were detained, and suspicions were brought against 7 suspects.

=== 12 November 2025 ===
On November 12, the court arrested Ihor Myronyuk with a bail of 126 million hryvnias and Security Director of Energoatom Dmytro Basov with a bail of 40 million.

Ukrainian President Volodymyr Zelenskyy demanded the resignation of Minister of Justice German Galushchenko and Minister of Energy Svitlana Hrynchuk, who appeared as members of the group.

=== 15 February 2026 ===
On 15 February 2026, Galushchenko was detained by NABU and SAP while attempting to cross the Ukrainian border on the Kyiv-Warsaw train.

The following day, Galushchenko was charged with participating in a criminal organization and laundering proceeds obtained by criminal means. According to NABU, Galushchenko and his family members became investors in a fictitious investment fund, created to launder the $100 million siphoned out of Ukrainian state nuclear energy company Energoatom. On the same day, the High Anti-Corruption Court partially upheld Galushchenko's complaint of “unlawful detention” but left him in custody. The court ordered Galushchenko to be held in custody for 60 days with bail set at UAH 200 million.

== Draft law 12414 ==
According to Kyiv Independent, a legislative attempt in mid 2025 to limit NABU's powers was partly motivated by Operation Midas. The draft law, numbered 12414, was adopted by the Verkhovna Rada (the national parliament of Ukraine) on 22 July 2025. The draft law aimed at limiting the powers of NABU and SAP, two key Ukrainian anti-corruption institutions. There were several detentions and searches of NABU employees. In particular, detectives Ruslan Mahamedrasulov and Viktor Husarov were detained on alleged suspicion of cooperation with Russian special services. According to a claim by the Security Service of Ukraine, Mahamedrasulov maintained contact with former Opposition Platform — For Life People's Deputy Fedir Khrystenko, who allegedly oversaw the strengthening of Russia's influence on NABU since 2020. According to NABU detective Oleksandr Abakumov, Mahamedrasulov directly supervised the investigation as part of Operation Midas. The law was cancelled after a wave of anti-government protests.

== Key suspects ==
- Timur Mindich, businessman, co-owner of Kvartal 95 Studio, close friend of President Zelenskyy. He is considered the leader of the group. On the audio recordings he is mentioned under the call sign "Karlsson" (Ukrainian: Карлсон, romanized: Karlson).
- Ihor Myronyuk, former advisor to the Minister of Energy. Served as an overseer of the nuclear industry, influencing personnel appointments and payments. Call sign: "Rocket" (Рокет, Roket).
- Dmytro Basov, Executive Director of Security at Energoatom, former employee of the Prosecutor General's Office of Ukraine. Directly involved in extortion. Call sign: "Tenor". During the scheme, his family acquired property worth $360,000, which did not correspond to their official income.
- German Galushchenko, Minister of Energy of Ukraine (2021–2025, in office at the time of the investigation), Minister of Justice at the time of the operation. Not officially a suspect, but was the subject of searches. According to media reports, he appears in audio recordings under the call sign "Professor".
- Oleksandr Tsukerman, head of the money laundering "back office" Call sign: "Sugarman" (Шугармен, Shuharmen). Fled Ukraine.
- Mykhaylo Tsukerman, Alexander's brother, allegedly involved in the financial part of the scheme. Also fled Ukraine.
- Oleksiy Chernyshov, former Deputy Prime Minister of Ukraine. Accused of illicit enrichment. Appears in recordings under the call sign "Che Guevara" (Че Гевара, Che Hevara). The transfer of 1.2 million dollars and 100 thousand euros in cash to him was recorded.
- Serhiy Pushkar, current member of the National Energy Commission. Mentioned in connection with the transfer of $20,000.
- Andriy Yermak, former Head of Office of the President of Ukraine, suspect in Energoatom $100 million corruption scheme.

== Reactions ==
- The head of the NABU detective unit, Oleksandr Abakumov, reported that approximately $100 million was channeled through this corruption scheme.
- Ukrainian President Volodymyr Zelenskyy, in his evening address, supported the NABU's actions, emphasizing that "everyone who perpetrated these schemes must receive a clear procedural response—there must be convictions." He noted that "the integrity of Energoatom is a priority," especially during a time of war, when nuclear power generation is critical. Zelenskyy also imposed National Security and Defense Council sanctions on Mindich and Tsukerman, including freezing their assets, as well as other restrictions.
- Ukrainian Prime Minister Yulia Svyrydenko stated that the Cabinet of Ministers awaits the results of the investigation into the Energoatom case and will provide full cooperation to anti-corruption agencies. She emphasized that the inevitability of punishment for corruption remains a key government priority.
- Ukrainian Energy Minister Svitlana Hrynchuk stated at a briefing that she and her predecessor, German Galushchenko, did not have an official adviser named Ihor Myronyuk. The energy ministry effectively distanced itself from the scandal, noting that the construction of protective structures for energy facilities was the responsibility of other agencies - the State Recovery Agency and Ukrenergo.
- Several MPs initiated the dismissal of German Galushchenko and Svitlana Hrynchuk from their positions as Ministers of Justice and Energy, respectively. Galushchenko and Hrynchuk were dismissed by parliament on 19 November 2025, although opposition party European Solidarity had occupied the rostrum at first to demand the resignation of the entire cabinet rather than only two ministers, and the formation of a national unity government.
- Myrotvorets added both Tymur Mindich and Oleksander Tsukerman to its database on November 12.
