= Ruslan Strilets =

Ukrainian statesman and politician

- Руслан Стрілець
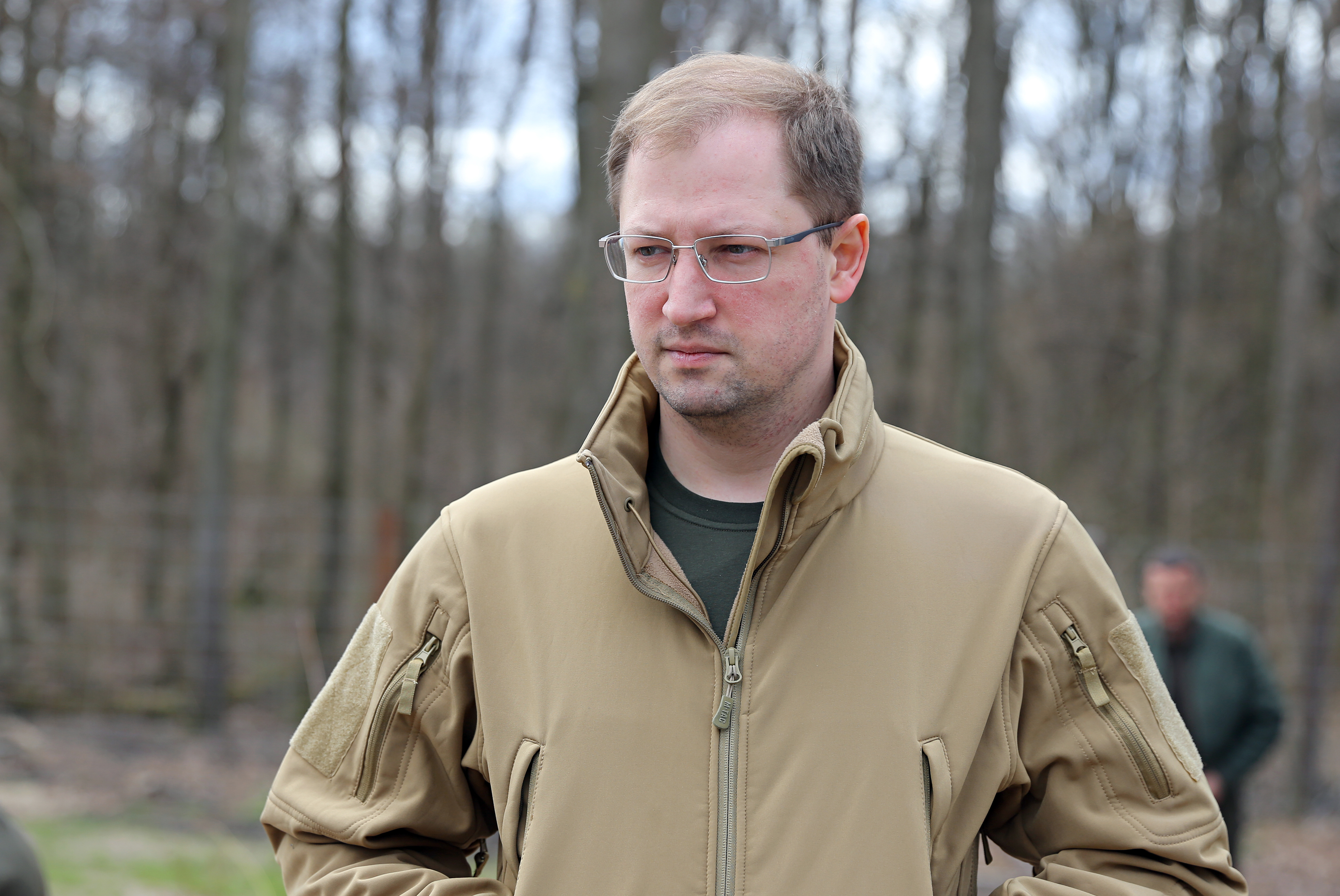
- Strilets in 2022

Minister of Environmental Protection and Natural Resources
- In office 14 April 2022 – 4 September 2024
- President: Volodymyr Zelenskyy
- Prime Minister: Denys Shmyhal
- Preceded by: Roman Abramovsky
- Succeeded by: Svitlana Hrynchuk

Personal details
- Born: 30 June 1984 (age 41) Dnipropetrovsk, Ukrainian SSR
- Education: Oles Honchar Dnipro National University; Dnipropetrovsk State University of Internal Affairs; Prydniprovska State Academy of Civil Engineering and Architecture
- Occupation: statesman politician

Ruslan Strilets (Ukrainian: Руслан Олександрович Стрілець; born 30 June 1984) is a Ukrainian statesman and politician. On 14 April 2022, he was appointed as the Minister of Environmental Protection and Natural Resources of Ukraine.

== Biography ==
In 2000, he graduated from the Oles Honchar Dnipro National University, majoring in “International Economics”. In 2007–2012, he held the positions of chief specialist, deputy head of department in the Dnipropetrovsk Regional State Administration.

In 2011, he graduated from the Dnipropetrovsk State University of Internal Affairs, majoring in “Jurisprudence”. From 2012 to 2014, he was the deputy head of the State Department of Environmental Protection in the Dnipropetrovsk Oblast, and in 2014–2015, he was the acting head director of the Department of Ecology and Natural Resources of the Dnipropetrovsk Regional State Administration.

In 2016, he graduated from the Prydniprovska State Academy of Civil Engineering and Architecture, majoring in “Ecology and Environmental Protection”. From 2015 to 2019, he held the position of director of the Department of Ecology and Natural Resources of the Dnipropetrovsk Regional State Administration.

In 2019, he graduated from the Dnipropetrovsk Regional Institute of Public Administration of the National Academy of Public Administration under the President of Ukraine with a degree in “Public Management and Administration”, in the same year he was appointed to the position of Deputy Director of the Department for Waste Management, Environmental Safety and Transition to Circular Economy in the Ministry of Energy and Environmental Protection of Ukraine.

Since July 2020, he has been the Deputy Minister of Environmental Protection and Natural Resources of Ukraine in the government of Denys Shmyhal. He supervises issues of digital development, digital transformations and digitalization. After Roman Abramovsky resigned from the post of minister, from November 2021, he temporarily performs the duties of the Minister of Environmental Protection and Natural Resources. In October 2021, he presented the National Register of Emissions and Transfer of Pollutants — a digital service on the EcoSystem electronic portal.

Since December 2020, he is a member of the Commission for Biosafety and Biological Protection under the National Security and Defense Council of Ukraine.

On 14 April 2022 Ruslan Strilets was appointed as the Minister of Environmental Protection and Natural Resources of Ukraine.

== See also ==
- Shmyhal Government
