= Vasyl Shevchuk =

Ukrainian politician

- Василь Шевчук
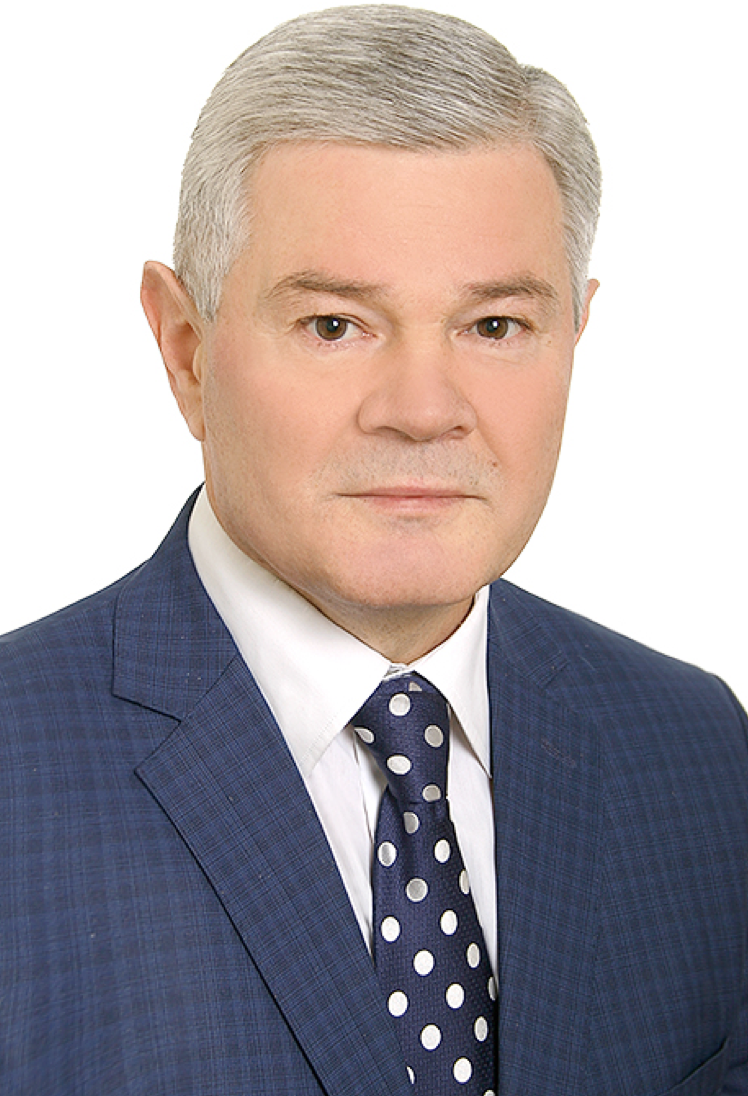

Minister of Natural Environment Protection and Nuclear Security
- In office August 23, 1998 – January 31, 2000
- Prime Minister: Valeriy Pustovoitenko
- Preceded by: Yuriy Kostenko
- Succeeded by: Ivan Zayets

Minister of Ecology and Natural Resources
- In office November 30, 2002 – June 6, 2003
- Prime Minister: Viktor Yanukovych
- Preceded by: Serhiy Kurykin
- Succeeded by: Serhiy Polyakov

Personal details
- Born: 19 January 1954 (age 72) Andriyevychi, Yemilchyne Raion, Zhytomyr Oblast
- Education: Kyiv National Economic University

Vasyl Yakovych Shevchuk (born January 19, 1954) was Ukraine's environment minister in 1998-2000 and 2002-2003 and a deputy minister of economy for sustainable development in 1993-1998. Under his leadership, Kyiv hosted the UN “Environment for Europe” Fifth Ministerial Conference in 2003. Shevchuk also held scientific and advisory positions at the National Security and Defense Council of Ukraine and at the Parliament of Ukraine (at the Speaker's Secretariat and the Institute of Legislation of the Verkhovna Rada of Ukraine).

Shevchuk has been the President of Ukraine Nature Conservation Society (UkrTOP) since 2002 and previously volunteered and served on its Board.

== Biography ==
Shevchuk was born on January 19, 1954, in Andriyevychi Village, Zhytomyr region of Ukraine, to Yakiv (father, 1917–79) and Olha (mother, b.1926) who were farmers.

Vasyl Shevchuk was educated at the Kyiv Institute of National Economy, Faculty of Accounting and Economics (1971–1975). He graduated from the graduate school of the Council for the Study of Productive Forces of Ukraine ANU (1981).

From 1981 to 1992 he worked as a junior researcher at the Council for the Study of Productive Forces of the National Academy of Sciences of Ukraine, in the system of State Construction of Ukraine and Mongolia. He was a leading researcher and head of the Center for Economic Research and Forecasting of the Kyiv National University of Construction and Architecture of the Ministry of Education and Science of Ukraine.

In 1992 -1993 Shevchuk worked as a senior consultant of the Economic Service of the President of Ukraine and coordinated the development of investment policy.

From 1993 to 1995 he was a Deputy Minister of Environmental Protection of Ukraine. He headed the development and implementation of the economic mechanism of rational use of nature and environmental protection and reproduction of water resources and ecosystems, financial support of nature reserves.

In 1995-1997 Vasyl Shevchuk was First Deputy Minister of Environmental Protection and Nuclear Safety of Ukraine. He provided the development and implementation of the main directions of state policy of Ukraine in the field of environmental protection, use of natural resources and environmental safety.

In 1997-1998 he was First Deputy Minister of Economy of Ukraine. His responsibility was the development of a policy to stimulate investment activity in Ukraine, which made it possible to overcome the recession and restore economic development.

Then for 2 years Shevchuk was a Minister of Environmental Protection and Nuclear Safety of Ukraine. He provided state regulation of nuclear, radiation and man-made environmental safety; liquidation of the consequences of the Chernobyl disaster; development and implementation of environmental audit and non-capital modernization of production. He founded the National program of ecological rehabilitation of the Dnipro river basin and improvement of drinking water quality and State program for the protection of the Black and Azov seas. He headed the delegations of Ukraine at the forums of the IAEA, the UNECE, the Global Environment Facility, which contributed to the growth of support for Ukraine.

In 2000-2002 he was a Chief of Staff of the National Security and Defense Council of Ukraine, Director of the Ukrainian Institute for Environmental Research and Resources under the National Security and Defense Council of Ukraine. He organized the preparation of materials for meetings of the National Security and Defense Council on important issues, including scientific and technological safety and innovation policy, water safety and drinking water quality, global climate change and national policy in this area, ensuring technogenic and environmental safety, etc.

Vasyl Shevchuk headed the scientific development of the draft Concept of National Security of Ukraine (new edition), which was approved by the Verkhovna Rada of Ukraine by the Law "On the Fundamentals of National Security of Ukraine" and provided a course for European integration and accession to NATO. He initiated the establishment of the Interdepartmental Commission on Scientific and Technological Security under the National Security and Defense Council of Ukraine. Together with the National Academy of Sciences of Ukraine, he developed the draft National Doctrine of Innovative Development and Modernization of Ukraine's Economy. He provided the preparation of the National Report of Ukraine on the state of implementation at the national level of the "Agenda for the XXI Century", participated in the state delegation of Ukraine in the World Summit on Sustainable Development (Johannesburg, 2002).

On April 7, 2000, he was awarded the first rank of civil servant.

From 2002 to 2003 Shevchuk was a Minister of Ecology and Natural Resources of Ukraine. He headed the Delegation of Ukraine and the National Organizing Committee of the 5th Pan-European Conference of Ministers "Environment for Europe" (Kyiv, May 21–23, 2003). Form 2003, he is a Chairman of the Ukrainian Society for Nature Protection, an all-Ukrainian public organization founded in 1946 with more than 1 million members.

He ensured the signing and ratification by Ukraine of the Kyoto Protocol to the UN Framework Convention on Climate Change, which brought Ukraine's economy more than $1 billion investment.

On behalf of Ukraine, Vasyl Shevchuk signed the Convention on the Protection and Sustainable Development of the Carpathians, a number of international conventions and protocols, bilateral interstate agreements with many European countries.

In 2003, he became a President of the Dnipro Revival Foundation. The main area of activity was to promote the implementation of the National Program for Environmental Rehabilitation of the Dnipro River Basin and to improve the quality of drinking water.

From 2003 to 2006 Shevchuk was a Head of the Secretariat of the Chairman of The Verkhovna Rada of Ukraine.

In 2006-2011 he took a position of a Deputy Head of the Department of Complex Problems of State-Building of the Institute of Legislation of the Verkhovna Rada of Ukraine.

Since 2011, he is Director General of the Center for Sustainable Development Studies and a President of the International Dnipro Foundation.

He was awarded the Diploma of the Verkhovna Rada of Ukraine.

=== Family ===
He is married with Oksana Nezhentseva (1959) who is an economist. They have a daughter Yulia (1983) who is a lawyer.

== Public Service and the Academia ==
Professor Shevchuk is the author of more than 200 scientific works, including more than 20 monographs, including Macroeconomic Issues in Sustainable Development, Encyclopedia of Water, Natural Resource Economics, Nature Restoration and Sustainable Development, Sustainable Development and Natural Resource Economics. He was involved in drafting numerous laws, policy papers and national programs. Under his scientific leadership, the government prepared The Foundation of the National Security of Ukraine, The Concept of Sustainable Development of Ukraine, National Report of Ukraine on the Status of Implementation of Agenda 21 for the Sustainable Development Summit in Johannesburg in 2002.

Professor Shevchuk serves at the National Academy of Sciences as the head of Noosphere and Harmonious Development Theories Section and a member of Environment and Sustainable Development Council.

== Links ==
Vasyl Shevchuk's Publications
