= Nature Conservation Society of Japan =

- 日本自然保護協会
- Formation: 17 October 1951
- Purpose: Nature conservation
- Headquarters: 2F, Mitoyo Building, 1-16-10 Shinkawa, Chūō, Tōkyō, Japan
- Coordinates: 35°40′38″N 139°47′02″E
- Members: 24,142 (31 March 2016)
- Key people: Kameyama Akira (亀山章) (Chairman)
- Website: Official website

The Nature Conservation Society of Japan (公益財団法人 日本自然保護協会, Kōeki zaidan hōjin Nihon shizen hogo kyōkai) (NACS-J) is a Japanese NGO founded in 1951. It is a member organization of the International Union for Conservation of Nature, for which it acts as the Japanese coordinator. The society developed out of the Oze Marsh Conservation Union (尾瀬保存期成同盟), formed in 1949 to challenge plans to build a hydroelectric power station in the Oze marshes; two years later, after organizing a petition to combat the issue of sulfur mining at Mount Meakan in Hokkaidō, the Union reformed as the country's first nature conservation organization. More recent initiatives have included the development of a citizen-led satoyama monitoring system.

== See also ==
- Oze National Park
- Wildlife Protection Areas in Japan
- Wild Bird Society of Japan
