= Ministry of Environmental Protection and Natural Resources (Ukraine) =

Government ministry of Ukraine

Ministry of Environmental Protection and Natural Resources (Міністерство захисту довкілля та природних ресурсів)
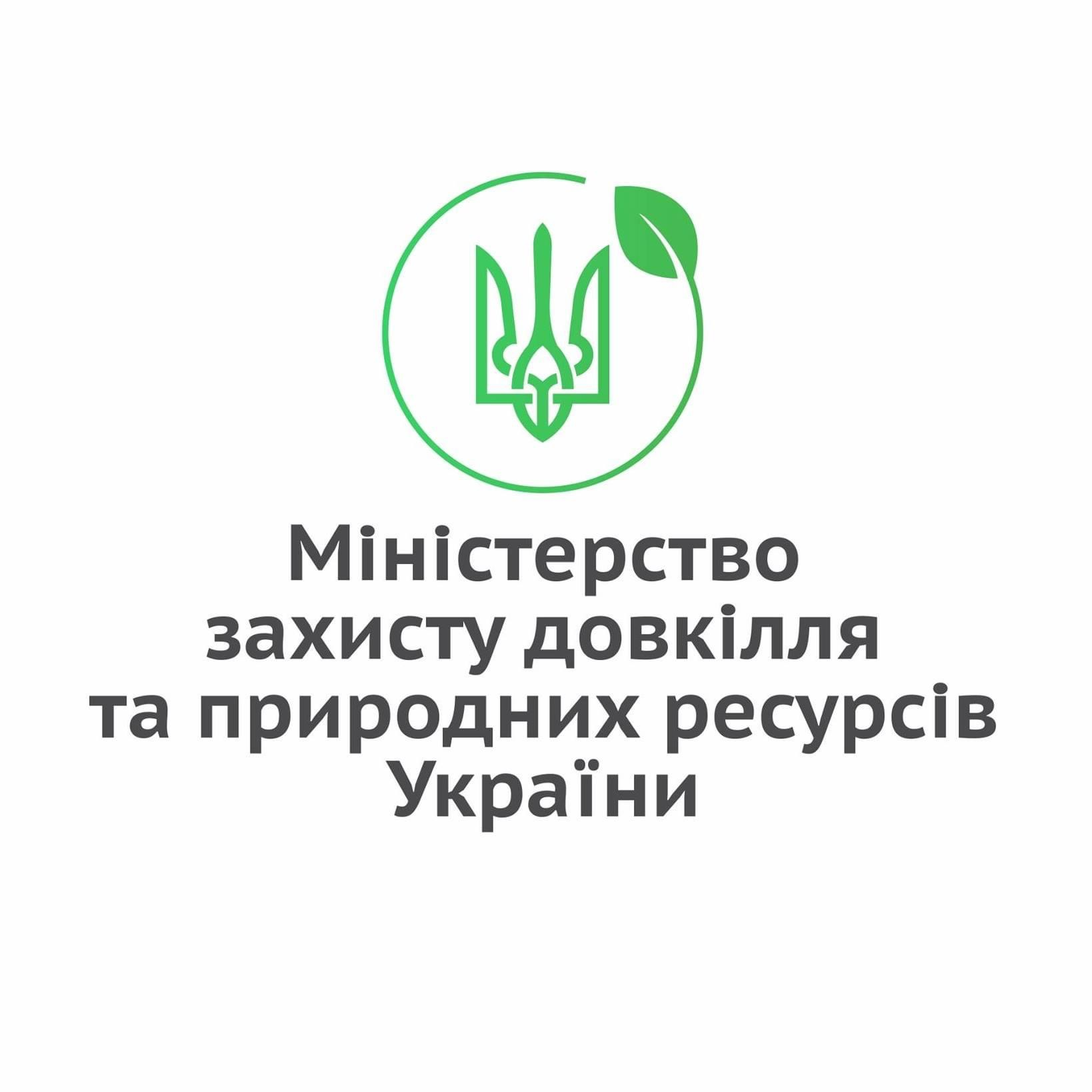

Agency overview
- Formed: 19 June 1991
- Preceding agency: Ministry of Ecology and Natural Resources
- Jurisdiction: Government of Ukraine
- Headquarters: 35, Metropolitan Vasyl Lypkivskyi street, Kyiv
- Employees: 241 (2016)
- Minister responsible: vacant (merged with the Ministry of Economy since 17 July 2025)
- Child agencies: State Service of Geology and Natural Resources; Agency of Water Resources; Agency of Eco. Investments; State Ecological Inspection
- Website: Official website

Footnotes
- From August 2019 until May 2020 the Ministry was merged with the Ministry of Energy Generation

Ministry of Environmental Protection and Natural Resources of Ukraine (Ukrainian: Міністерство захисту довкілля та природних ресурсів, romanized: Ministerstvo zakhystu dovkillia ta pryrodnykh resursiv) is the main authority in the system of central government of Ukraine responsible for ecological monitoring and development of the country. As a government ministry it exists since 1991 being formed during dissolution of the Soviet Union.

== History ==
This government institution was established in 1967 as the State Committee of Nature Protection. In 1978, it was merged into the All-Union State Committee under the same name centered in Moscow. Following Ukraine's declaration of independence, the state committee was reorganized into the Ministry of Environmental Protection of Ukraine. In 1995–2000, the ministry also supervised nuclear safety as the Ministry of Environmental Protection and Nuclear Safety of Ukraine. In 2000, it switched to its current name until 2003 and recovered it again in 2010. In 2003-2010 it was the Ministry of Environmental Protection of Ukraine.

On 29 August 2019 the Honcharuk Government merged the ministry into the Ministry of Energy and Coal Mining. But the succeeding Shmyhal Government re-created (the ecology ministry) on 27 May 2020. The new returning post of ecology minister was filled when Roman Abramovsky was appointed by parliament on 19 June 2020. On 17 July 2025 the ministry was once again merged, this time with the Ministry of Economy.

== Structure ==
The ministry is headed by the minister of ecology and natural resources, the first deputy, and other deputies to assist the minister. The ministry elects several state administrations representatives to coordinate operation of selected government companies.

=== Central body ===
- Minister
  - State agencies
  - Administration of organizational-analytical support to Minister
  - Control-Revisionary Section
  - Collegiate of Ministry
  - First Deputy
    - Department of State Ecological Policy and International Actions
    - Legal Department
    - Section in relationship with press media and public
    - Administration in property, job security, material-technical and informational support
    - Chief Specialist in Mobilization
    - Division of controls and checks in execution of acts and decrees of higher bodies of state power
    - Division of regime-secret actions
  - Deputy – Head of Central Body
    - Department of Ecological Security
    - Department of Economics and Finances
    - Administration of State Ecological Monitoring
    - Section of state expertise
    - Section of human resources
    - Section of accounting and financial report
    - Division of tender procedures
  - Deputy
    - Department of Conservation Affairs
    - Department in Security of Natural Resources and Eco-Network

=== State agencies ===
- State Service of Geology and Resources (official website if inaccessible )
  - Nadra Ukrainy (official website)
- State Agency of Water Resources (official website)
- State Agency of Ecological Investments (official website)
- State Ecological Inspection (official website)

=== Other institutions ===
- Ukrainian Science-Research Institute of Ecological problems, Kharkiv (official website)
- Ukrainian Scientific Centre of Ecology of the Sea, aka UkrSCES (Odesa) (official website)

==== Black Sea Globe ====
In 2023, UkrSCES, with the support of EU and UNDP, opened the Kids Scientific-Art School “The Gllobe of The Black Sea” (or “Black Sea Globe”) in Odesa and Mykolaiv. In 2024 its students hosted artworks exhibitions under the title “Black Sea Globe”, commonly representing portolans of the Black Sea and the Sea of Azov painted in artistic style.

== List of ministers ==
=== Ecology and natural resources ===
Name of ministry	Name of minister	Term of office	
Name of ministry	Name of minister	Start	End
State Committee in Nature Protection	Boris Voltovsky		
State Committee in Nature Protection	Dina Protsenko	11 April 1978	3 November 1988
State Committee in Nature Protection	Viktor Filonenko	3 November 1988	1991
Ministry of Environmental Protection	Yuriy Shcherbak	19 June 1991	
Ministry of Environmental Protection	Yuriy Kostenko		
Ministry of Environmental Protection and Nuclear Safety	Yuriy Kostenko		
Ministry of Environmental Protection and Nuclear Safety	Vasyl Shevchuk		
Ministry of Ecology and Natural Resources	Ivan Zayets		
Ministry of Ecology and Natural Resources	Serhiy Kurykin		
Ministry of Ecology and Natural Resources	Vasyl Shevchuk		
Ministry of Ecology and Natural Resources	Serhiy Polyakov		
Ministry of Environmental Protection	Serhiy Polyakov		
Ministry of Environmental Protection	Pavlo Ihnatenko		
Ministry of Environmental Protection	Vasyl Dzharty		
Ministry of Environmental Protection	Heorhiy Filipchuk		
Ministry of Environmental Protection	Viktor Boiko		
Ministry of Environmental Protection	Mykola Zlochevsky		
Ministry of Ecology and Natural Resources	Mykola Zlochevsky		
Ministry of Ecology and Natural Resources	Eduard Stavytsky		
Ministry of Ecology and Natural Resources	Oleg Proskuryakov		
Ministry of Ecology and Natural Resources	Andriy Mokhnyk		
Ministry of Ecology and Natural Resources	Ihor Shevchenko		
Ministry of Ecology and Natural Resources	Serhiy Kurykin		
Ministry of Ecology and Natural Resources	Hanna Vronska		
Ministry of Ecology and Natural Resources	Ostap Semerak	14 April 2016	29 August 2019
In 2019 Ministry of Ecology and Natural Resources was liquidated and merged

=== Energy and environmental protection ===
Prime Minister(s)	Name	Term of office	
Prime Minister(s)	Name	Start	End
In 2019 Ministry of Ecology and Natural Resources merged with Ministry of Energy and Coal Mining
Oleksiy Honcharuk	Oleksiy Orzhel	29 August 2019	4 March 2020
Denys Shmyhal	Vitaliy Shubin (acting minister)	11 March 2020	16 April 2020
Denys Shmyhal	Olha Buslavets (acting minister)	16 April 2020	27 May 2020

=== Environmental protection and natural resources ===
Prime Minister(s)	Name	Term of office	
Prime Minister(s)	Name	Start	End
In 2020 the Ministry of Energy and Environmental Protection merge was undone and the Ministry of Environmental Protection reemerged
Denys Shmyhal	Roman Abramovsky	19 June 2020	3 November 2021
Denys Shmyhal	Ruslan Strilets	3 November 2021 appointed acting minister and on 14 April 2022 appointed minister	4 September 2024
Denys Shmyhal	Svitlana Hrynchuk	5 September 2024	17 July 2025

== See also ==
- Cabinet of Ministers of Ukraine
- Committee of the Verkhovna Rada on issues of ecological policy
- Emerald Network of Ukraine
