= Background and causes of the Syrian revolution =

This article discusses the background and reasons that contributed to the outbreak of the Syrian revolution. What began as large-scale peaceful protests in March 2011 as part of the 2010–11 Arab Spring protests that reverberated across the Arab World, eventually escalated into a civil war following the brutal crackdown by Assad regime's security apparatus.

The Ba'athist government in Syria was constructed by General Hafez al-Assad, who came to power through a coup in 1970 and purged the Arab Socialist Ba'ath party of rivals led by Salah Jadid. The regime structure consisted of three parts: a powerful Ba'ath party organization which has extensive control over the Syrian society, a formidable security apparatus – consisting of secret police, Ba'athist paramilitaries and Syrian military establishment – glued to the party's Central Command, in addition to upper-class Alawite elites who are loyal to the Assad dynasty. Hafez al-Assad's dictatorship lasted for three decades; characterized by extensive socio-political repression, censorship, human rights abuses, and systematic mass violence unleashed on civilian populations through brutal tactics such as massacres, forced disappearances and torture. After Hafez al-Assad's death in 2000, his son Bashar al-Assad became the President and inherited the totalitarian system of Ba'athist Syria.

While Bashar al-Assad continued to strongly espouse the socialist doctrines of Ba'athism; he started to gear Syria towards a socialist market economy by loosening Ba'ath party's grip on the economy and opening up private sectors. Syrian economy was largely supported by oil exports, which enabled to fund various industries, including agriculture, manufacturing, and tourism. At the onset of the Arab Spring protests and eruption of Syrian revolution in 2011, Syria's economic situation was considered dire, with rising inflation, high unemployment rates, corruption and the socio-political atmosphere was characterized by heavy repression. These were a direct consequence of economic liberalization of 2000s; which skyrocketed socio-economic inequalities, increased corruption and cronyism of party oligarchs; thereby drastically alienating the middle and working classes. New monopolies in agrarian sector acquired by pro-government oligarchs and government's mismanagement of the droughts of 2006-11 worsened the living conditions of the peasants, causing widespread disenchantment and exacerbation of rural-urban divisions.

== Factors ==
=== Unemployment ===
Although official figures put the unemployment rate at 8.1 percent in 2009, Syrian economists estimate it at 24.4 percent. In 2010, the overall poverty rate was 34.3%, while the poverty rate in rural areas was about 62%. Poverty declined between 1997 and 2004 but began to rise in the second half of the 2000s. According to the World Bank, over 20% of Syrians were living in poverty before 2011. The poverty rate had been steadily increasing since the early 2000s due to rising food prices, an influx of refugees, and a decrease in private sector employment. The poorest region in Syria prior to 2011 was the northeast region, particularly the governorate of Raqqa. This region was characterized by low levels of development, poverty and a lack of economic opportunities.

=== Drought ===
Between 2007 and 2010, Syria experienced its worst drought on instrumental record, made more likely by climate change. It has been proposed that the drought caused the collapse of agriculture in Syria and contributed to increased migration and contributed to the escalation of violence in 2011, although more recent analyses in Political Geography and Nature have challenged this narrative.

=== Increase in State repression ===
Ba'athist Syria under the dictatorship of Bashar al-Assad has been widely described as the most "ruthless police state" in the Arab World; having enforcing a wide range of restrictions on the free movement of civilians, independent journalists and unauthorized individuals. The police state apparatus was established in the 1970s by Hafez al-Assad who ran a military dictatorship with the Ba'ath party as its civilian cover. At the apex of the system are the Assad family loyalists from various Alawite clans who dominate the armed forces, Mukhabarat and weld heavy influence over the political system; tasked with the objective of pacifying the general populations. Alongside North Korea and Eritrea, Assad regime operates one of the largest censorship mechanisms that regulate the transfer of information. Reporters Without Borders listed Syria as the 6th worst country in its 2010 Press Freedom Index.

After winning the 2007 presidential election in Syria with 99.82% of the declared votes, Bashar al-Assad implemented numerous measures that further intensified political and cultural repression. Numerous journalists were arrested and independent press centres were shut down. Syrian government intensifed its censorship of the Internet; banning access to more than 200 websites, including sites such as Wikipedia, YouTube, etc. Internet centres were allowed to operate only after the prior authorization of Syrian surveillance agencies. In 2007, the Syrian government enacted a law that forced Internet cafes to keep records of all online comments posted by users in chat forums, as well as their browsing habits. Several individuals who used internet cafes were arrested and reports emerged of the existence of specialized prison centres that detained individuals accused of "internet crimes".

In November 2007, Facebook was banned in Syria. In December, Syrian government launched a large-scale domestic crackdown, arresting more than 30 political dissidents and civil society activists who advocated gradual changes within the political system. After 2006, Assad government expanded travel bans against numerous dissidents, intellectuals, authors and artists living in Syria; preventing them and their families from travelling abroad. In September 2010, The Economist newspaper described Syrian government as "the worst offender among Arab states", that engaged in imposing travel bans and restricted free movement of people. More than 400 individuals in Syria were reportedly restricted by Assad regime's travel bans in 2010.

=== Corruption ===
During the 1970s, Syrian dictator Hafez al-Assad had created patronage networks of Ba'ath party elites and Alawite clients loyal to his family. Members of Assad family established control over vast swathes of the Syrian economy and corruption became endemic in the public and private sectors. The pervasive nature of corruption was a source of controversy within the Ba'ath party circles as well as the wider public; as early as the 1980s. The first decade of Bashar al-Assad's rule was marked by the institutionalization of corruption, and many regime loyalists became business magnates under the cover of state's "social market" policies. Assad's cousin Rami Makhlouf was the regime's most favored oligarch during the 2000s and was widely reviled in the public. The persistence of corruption, sectarian bias towards Alawites, nepotism and widespread bribery that existed in party, bureaucracy and military led to popular anger that resulted in the eruption of the 2011 Syrian Revolution.

The country ranked 129th out of 183 countries as per the 2011 Corruption Perceptions Index. The country ranked 178th out of 180 countries as per the 2021 Corruption Perceptions Index.

=== Lack of democracy ===
Before the Baath Party took power in 1963, Syria was a democracy in name only. Most of the government's power was concentrated in the hands of the military and the president, who had no real opposition. Political parties were banned and the few elections that did take place were widely seen as fraudulent. Freedom of speech, assembly, and the press were severely restricted and human rights abuses were rampant. The state of democracy in Syria during the Shukri al-Quwatli presidency was highly limited due to the strong influence of the military. Quwatli was elected president in 1943, but he was unable to implement a fully democratic system of government because of his limited power. He was constantly at odds with the military leaders, who held considerable power and influence over the country. Quwatli did introduce some democratic reforms, such as a new electoral law and the creation of a multi-party system, but he was unable to bring about significant changes. As a result, the state of democracy in Syria remained fragile and limited during this period.

The Ba'ath Party coup in Syria in 1963 effectively ended all forms of democracy in the country and ushered in a period of authoritarian rule. This period was characterized by a one-party state, the suppression of political dissent, and a lack of meaningful elections. The government was largely controlled by the president and members of the Ba'ath Party. Citizens were not allowed to freely express their opinions or to organize for political purposes. Human rights violations were commonplace, and the government often resorted to violence in order to maintain control.

=== The collapse of the lira ===
The Syrian pound was in a state of decline before the war due to a combination of several factors, including macroeconomic mismanagement, a lack of foreign investment, and an over-reliance on oil exports. The Syrian government also implemented restrictive exchange rate policies, which weakened the value of the pound and reduced international confidence in the currency. Additionally, the U.S. imposed economic sanctions on Syria in 2004, further reducing the value of the Syrian pound. The exchange rate of the Syrian lira before Hafez al-Assad became president of Syria in 1971 was approximately 4.75 lira to one United States dollar. In 2011, the exchange rate of the Syrian lira was 47.35 Syrian lira to 1 US dollar.

=== Iran's interference in Syria affairs ===
Prior to the war, relations between Iran and Syria were strong. Iran was Syria's closest ally in the region, and the two countries had a mutual defense agreement in place. Iran had provided Syria with economic and military support for decades, and the two countries shared strong ties in the areas of culture, trade, and politics. Syrian opposition argued that Iran has tried to spread Shiism in Syria. Iran has long supported Syrian President Bashar al-Assad's government and has used its Shia allies and proxies in the region, such as Hezbollah, to help prop up Syrian forces. Iran has also provided military, financial and logistical support for Shia militias fighting in Syria and has been accused of trying to spread its own version of Shia Islam in the country.

=== Sectarianism and rule of the minority ===
The Alawites are estimated to make up between 10 and 15% of the population in Syria. They had considerable clout in the country, as the Alawite sect has a long history of providing leaders to the Syrian government. It was not until the 1970s that Hafez al-Assad, a member of the Alawite sect, rose to power and began to favor his own sect over other religious and ethnic groups in Syria. This led to the Alawites becoming an increasingly influential political force in Syria, and they have remained so ever since.

=== Discrimination against Kurds ===
Kurds in Syria were long denied their basic rights throughout decades of Ba'athist rule. Many restrictions were placed on the usage of Kurdish language and Kurdish natives faced severe discrimination from Ba'athists. Kurdish political and cultural activities were also banned by the Ba'ath regime. The Kurdish language was not officially recognized, it had no place in public schools. A decree from 1989 outlawed the use of Kurdish at the workplace as well as in marriages and other celebrations. In September 1992 another government order banned children from being named with Kurdish names.

In 1973, Hafez al-Assad implemented the "Arab Belt" (al-hizam al-'arabi) policy, a programme to ethnically cleanse over 150,000 Kurds in the border areas with Turkey; by bringing in Arab settlers. The aim of the programme was to secure resource-rich and fertile northeastern Syria; so that the state could directly control the oil reserves and agricultural products. Arab Belt programme was executed under the guise of socialist land acquisition policies of the Ba'ath party. Hundreds of thousands of Kurds were rendered stateless and Syrian Arab settlers occupied these lands. Tens of thousands of Kurds of the Al-Hasakah governorate were forcibly displaced and their lands were distributed to Arab settlers from other provinces for agricultural cultivation. In 2007, another such scheme in Al-Hasakah governate, 6,000 square kilometers around Al-Malikiyah were granted to Arab families, while tens of thousands of Kurdish inhabitants of the villages concerned were evicted.

At the onset of the 2011 revolution, around 300,000 Kurds were denied their citizenship and rendered stateless. These Kurds were commonly referred to as "Ajanib" (foreigners).

=== Economic inequality ===
Syria had a large disparity between the wealthy and the poor. This created a sense of injustice and frustration among the lower classes, which contributed to the civil war. Prior to 2011, the country was facing a significant level of economic inequality. The country's wealth was highly concentrated in the hands of a small elite, with the richest 10% of the population owning 20% of the country's wealth. This inequality was particularly evident in terms of access to education and health care, with wealthy individuals able to access better resources than poorer citizens. The country also had one of the highest levels of income inequality in the world, with the poorest 40% of the population earning just one-third of the country's total income. The economic inequality in Syria was also reflected in the country's unemployment rate, which was higher than the regional average. The country's economy was also characterized by a lack of diversification, with the oil industry accounting for over a third of the country's GDP.

=== U.S. Sanctions ===
Before 2011, Syria was already under US sanctions with some dating back to the 1970s. Before the war, US sanctions on Syria included a wide range of restrictions on economic, financial, and military activities. These included an embargo on Syrian exports to the United States, restrictions on foreign assistance and assistance from international financial institutions, a ban on US exports to Syria (except for food and medicine), a ban on US investment in Syria, and restrictions on financial transactions involving Syria. Additionally, US sanctions prohibited US persons from engaging in any transaction with the Government of Syria that had the potential to contribute to Syria's military or terrorist capabilities, or to support the Government of Syria's activities that were contrary to US foreign policy interests. US sanctions also included a ban on the export of certain goods and technologies to Syria, as well as restrictions on the travel of Syrian government personnel to the United States.

== Immediate Cause ==
=== Spread of Arab Spring ===
According to Lebanese academic Gilbert Achcar:

"..what started in Syria in 2011 is part of the same revolutionary process alongside other countries. It is part of the same phenomenon and driven by the same basic causes – of stalled development, of unemployment and particularly youth unemployment.. as a result of the neo-liberal policies implemented by the Assads.... Syria is a country which has seen massive impoverishment over the last decade, especially in the rural areas; the level of poverty has been rising and reached a situation where almost one third of the population were below the national poverty line... All this was taking place against a background of huge social inequality, a very corrupt regime – where Bashar Assad's cousin became the richest man in the country, controlling – it is widely believed – over half of the economy... This constitutes the deep root of the explosion, in combination with the fact that the Syrian regime is one of the most despotic in the region....What is specific to this regime is that Assad's father has reshaped and reconstructed the state apparatus, especially its hard nucleus – the armed forces – in order to create a Pretorian guard for itself... With a military that is completely loyal to the regime, any illusion that the regime could be overthrown merely through mass demonstrations was false. It was in a sense inevitable that the uprising would turn into a civil war because there is no way to overthrow a regime of this nature without a civil war."

As Arab Spring protests spread across the Arab world during early 2011, Syrian state media condemned Hosni Mubarak as an American client and broadcast the protests of Egyptian revolution across the country. This tactic resulted in the proliferation of the revolutionary slogans amongst Syrians, who came out in mass-protests demanding the overthrow of the Assad regime.

== Controversies ==
Some government supporters claim that one of the causes for the early protests is the government's refusal to the construction of a gas pipeline proposed by Qatar. Assad made this claim in a 2016 interview. According to this theory, Qatar wanted to export its large natural gas stocks to Europe through Syria.

== See also ==
- Economy of Syria
- Human rights in Syria
- Syrian Revolution
- List of Syrian defectors
