= Environmental impact of war =

Environmental problems caused by warfare

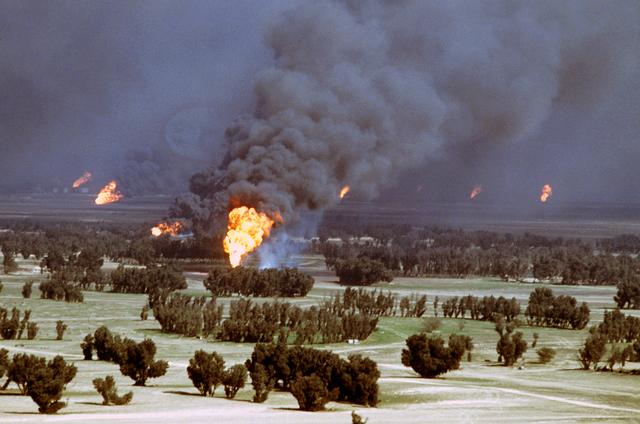
Kuwaiti oil fires set by retreating Iraqi forces during the Gulf War caused a dramatic decrease in air quality.

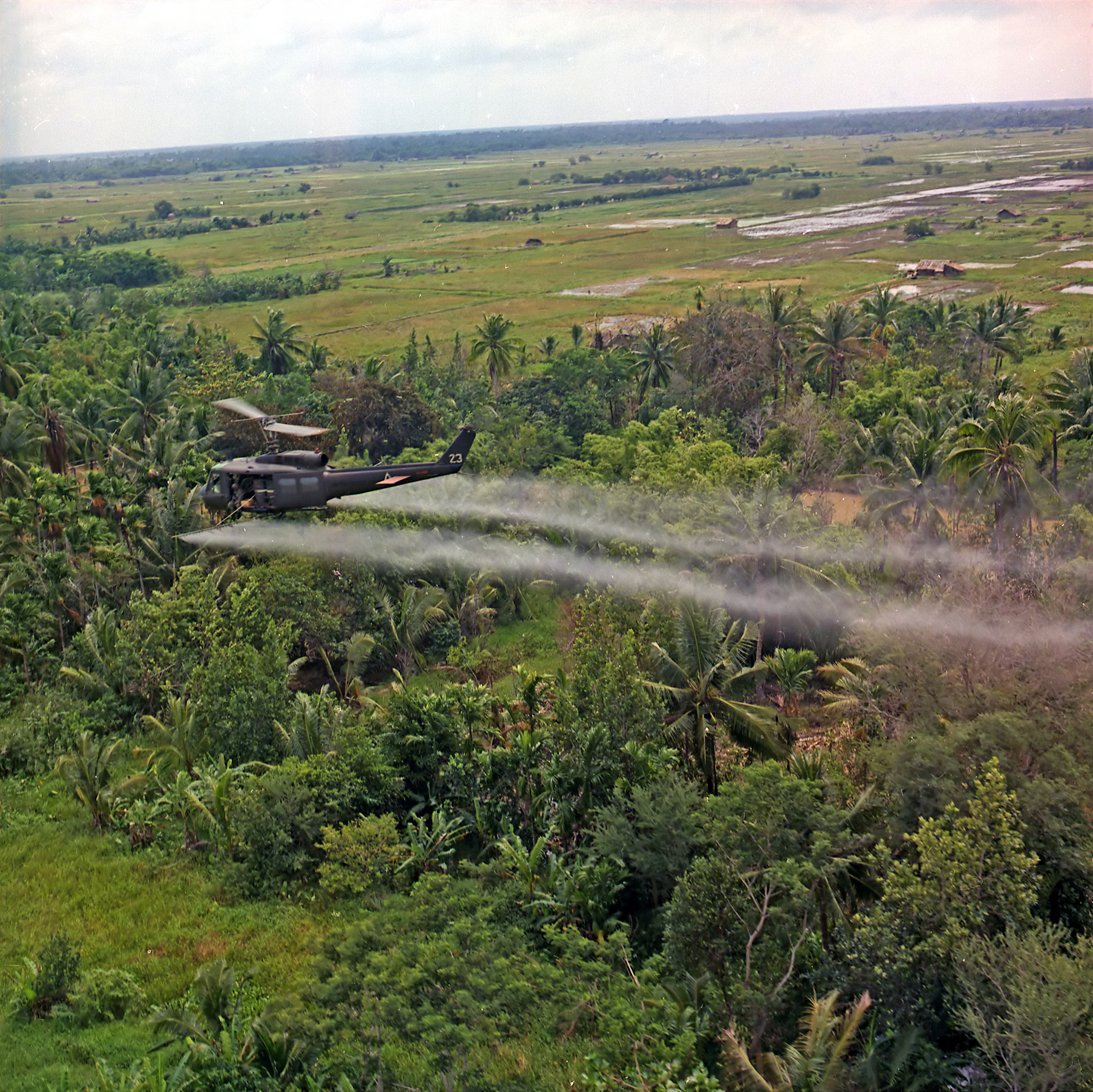
Agent Orange, a herbicide, being sprayed on farmland during the Vietnam War

The study of the environmental impact of war focuses on the modernization of warfare and its increasing effects on the environment. Tactics such as scorched earth methods have been used for much of recorded history; however, the methods of modern warfare cause far greater devastation on the biophysical environment. The progression of warfare from chemical weapons to nuclear weapons has increasingly created stress on ecosystems and the environment. Drone usage, which is advancing, emits nitrous oxides and other gases that can cause acid rain. Environmental toxins like these gases and heavy metals linger for decades in the environment, and in dry areas they can be transported across large distance. Genotoxic effects as in the case of Agent Orange can affect multiple generations. Even after war ends, contaminated land and water can keep harming the environment and nearby communities.

Wars also have a detrimental effects on environmental policy which can last for 20–30 years after the conflict. When wars create energy shortage and rise of fossil fuel prices, it disrupts global climate action. The military sector is responsible for around 5.5% of global GHG emissions (not counting emissions from the conflicts themself), which are not included in GHG assessments on global and country level. "Military technologies, particularly advanced weaponry and drones, contribute significantly to environmental degradation during conflicts. The ecological impact of these technologies is profound, primarily due to the contamination associated with their use and the infrastructure required to support them."

== Historical events ==
=== American Revolutionary War (1775-1783) ===
The American Revolution inflicted major impacts on the 18th-century natural world. At Valley Forge in Pennsylvania, for instance, during the winter of 1777-1778, George Washington's Continental Army soldiers cut down more than 127,000 trees in building their crude log huts, causing both short-term and long-term deforestation. In September 1778, British forces raided Martha's Vineyard Island off the Massachusetts coast, killing more than 10,000 sheep, though the raid also produced some "positive" environmental effects. At the Battles of Saratoga in upstate New York on 19 September and 7 October 1777, soldiers fired more than 660,000 lead musket balls, causing some negative environmental effects that persist into the 21st century.

=== American Civil War (1861-1865) ===
The American Civil War was largely fought in hot, wet regions where pandemic diseases such as malaria were prevalent. As a result, sickness rates were high on both sides. More powerful long range rifles and artillery caused high casualty rates of wounding and death. The Union forces had much better medical and hospital facilities, while the supply system failed so often in the Confederacy that for months at a time soldiers marched and fought barefoot, with little medicine available to their overworked doctors. The Union systematically devastated the railway system in the South, and ruined many cotton plantations. Combat operations killed thousands of horses and mules used to pull supplies, artillery and munitions.

=== World War I (1914-1918) ===
The first World War (WW I) saw chemicals especially chlorine, phosgene, and mustard gas used heavily. These were first developed by German chemists. Over 100,000 tons of toxic gas was produced by the end of the war in 1918. For the most part gas masks neutralized advantages. Gas injured many soldiers but it did not have a major change in the course of the war and here were no permanent environmental effects from it.

There were long term ecological impacts with ecosystem biodiversity loss. The war transformed the global logging industry as it demanded large quantities of lumber for ship construction. Excessive logging became selective among tree species for certain military demands. As a result, ecosystem biodiversity was reduced and further exacerbated by reforestation programs. Biodiversity is essential to ecosystem resilience and natural ecological processes. When reduced, this poses a threat for the increase of invasive species as they disrupt ecosystem carbon storage and climate regulation. Additionally, shockwaves from artillery shells changed the soil composition in many battleground areas.

=== World War II (1939–1945) ===
World War II (WW2) led to a vast increase in production and introduced many new environmental consequences. World War II was wide-ranging in its destruction of humans, animals, and materials. The postwar effects of World War II, both ecological and social, are still visible decades after the conflict ended.

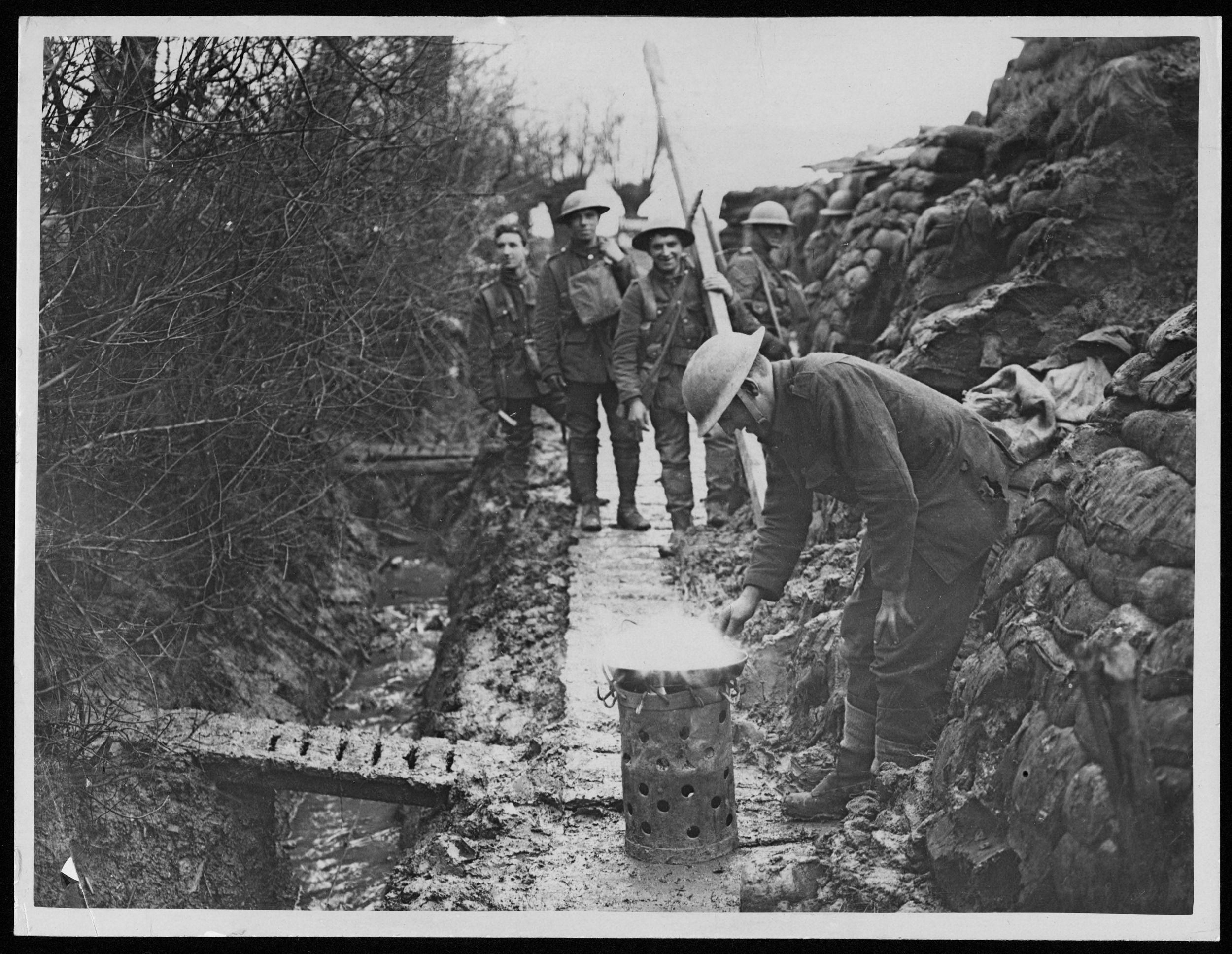
Frying bacon in the middle of the trenches, soaking in mud and chemicals left from all the bullets lying on the ground.

Similar to wildlife, ecosystems also suffer from noise pollution which is produced by military aircraft. During World War II, aircraft acted as a vector for the transportation of exotics whereby weeds and cultivated species were brought to oceanic island ecosystems by way of aircraft landing strips which were used as refueling and staging stations during operations in the Pacific theater. Before the war, the isolated islands around Europe were inhabited by a high number of endemic species. During World War II, aerial warfare had an enormous influence on fluctuating population dynamics. Two species of flightless birds, the Wake Island rail and the Laysan rail, became extinct when rats were introduced to the remote Pacific islands where they lived by naval vessels. The brown tree snake became established on Guam shortly after the war, presumably having stowed away on board military transport ships.

In August 1945, after fighting World War II for almost four years, the United States of America dropped an atomic bomb over the city of Hiroshima in Japan. About 70,000 people died in the first nine seconds after the bombing of Hiroshima, which was comparable to the death toll which resulted from the devastating Operation Meetinghouse air raid over Tokyo. Three days after the bombing of Hiroshima, the United States dropped a second atomic bomb on the industrial city of Nagasaki, instantly killing 35,000 people. The nuclear weapons released catastrophic levels of energy and radioactive particles. Once the bombs were detonated, the temperatures reached about 3980 °C / 7200 °F. With temperatures that high, all the flora and fauna were destroyed along with the infrastructure and human lives in the impact zones. The radioactive particles which were released resulted in widespread land and water contamination. The initial blasts increased the surface temperature and created crushing winds destroying trees and buildings in their path.

European forests experienced traumatic impacts which resulted from fighting during the war. Behind the combat zones, timber from cut down trees was removed in order to clear up the paths for fighting. The shattered forests in the battle zones faced exploitation.

The use of hazardous chemicals was first initiated during the war. The long-term effects of chemicals result from both their potential persistence and the poor disposal program of nations with stockpiled weapons.

During World War II, the demand for production of aluminum skyrocketed. In turn, Britain turned to its territories of British Guiana and Canada. Aluminum production quadrupled in these two colonies. This resulted in environmental degradation on a global scale as demands rose for materials to be used in the war.

Later in World War II, chemists developed even more harmful chemical bombs, which were packaged in barrels and directly deposited in the oceans. The disposal of the chemicals in ocean runs the risk of metal-based containers corroding and leaching the chemical contents of the vessel into the ocean. Through chemical disposal in the ocean, the contaminants may be spread throughout the various components of the ecosystems damaging marine and terrestrial ecosystems.

Marine ecosystems during were also damaged from wreckage from naval ships, which leaked oil into the water. Oil contamination in the Atlantic Ocean due to World War II shipwrecks is estimated at over 15 million tonnes. Oil spills are difficult to clean up and take many years to clean. To this day, traces of oil can still be found in the Atlantic Ocean from the naval shipwrecks which happened during World War II.

Additionally, the Baltic Sea contains a large quantity of unexploded munitions, including land and naval mines from World War II. Not only do these unexploded munitions pose a threat to boating traffic, but also marine life. When these munitions are detonated below the ocean, whether unintentionally or intentionally in an effort to clear them, marine organisms several kilometers away can be injured. Organisms far away can still be harmed, such as damage to their hearing range which in some cases is irreversible. One hundred and sixty five thousand naval mines were placed in the Baltic and western sea during World War II, with an estimated 15-30% of these still remaining active.

The use of chemicals during war helped increase the scale of chemical industries and it also. The development of chemical research during the war also lead to the postwar development of agricultural pesticides.

Chemical contaminations, and aerial warfare all contributed to reduction in the population of global flora and fauna, as well as a reduction in species diversity.

In 1946, in the U.S. Zone of Germany, the United States military advised the government to prepare accommodations and employment for people who last their homes. The answer was a special garden program that would provide new land for people to live in. This included land to provide food needed for the people as well. Forests were then surveyed for good soil that was suitable for crop production. This meant that the forest would be cut down in order to make land for farms and housing. In this program about 23,500,000 fest meters of lumber were produced out of the forests.

Aluminum was one of the biggest resources affected by World War II, as it was vital for aircraft production. Bauxite, an aluminum ore, and the mineral cryolite were essential, as well as required massive amounts of electrical power to be mined. The landscapes of bauxite mines are left lacking topsoil, flora, or fauna.

=== Korean War (1950-1953) ===
The Korean War also resulted in severe damage to the environment and ecosystem. During the war, widespread devastation resulted from direct combat, industrial chaos, and the considerable use of chemical agents, such as defoliants. In addition to conventional weapons, chemical agents were often used, killing much flora and fauna, contaminating soil, and destroying forests. Near the end of the war, the U.S Air force bombed five out of the 20 hydroelectric and irrigation dams in North Korea in Toksan, Chasan, Kuwonga, Kusong, and Toksang. These attacks harmed access to infrastructure and washed away important topsoil needed to grow crops like rice. The attacks occurred during the rice growing season, which lasts from May to August, making the effects of the attacks more severe for the local population.

=== Vietnam War (1959-1975) ===
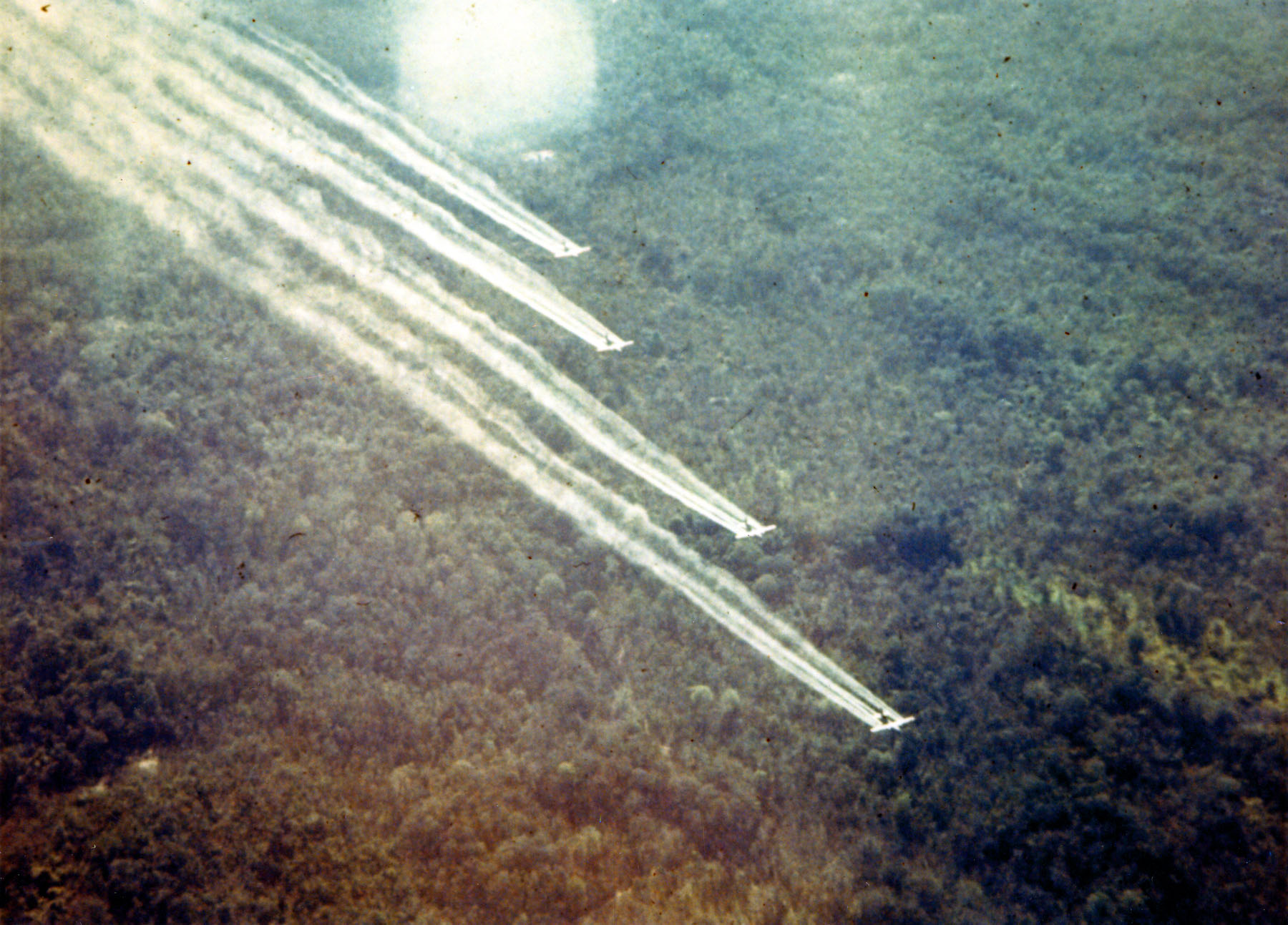
Defoliant spray run, part of Operation Ranch Hand, during the Vietnam War by UC-123B Provider aircraft

The Vietnam War had significant environmental implications due to chemical agents which were used to destroy militarily-significant vegetation. The Viet Cong found an advantage in remaining invisible by blending into a civilian population or taking cover in dense vegetation. The US military used "more than 20 million gallons of herbicides [...] to defoliate forests, clear growth along the borders of military sites and eliminate enemy crops." While the chemical agents gave the US an advantage in wartime efforts, the vegetation was unable to regenerate and it left behind bare mudflats which still existed years after spraying. Not only was the vegetation affected, but also the wildlife: "a mid-1980s study by Vietnamese ecologists documented just 24 species of birds and 5 species of mammals present in sprayed forests and converted areas, compared to 145–170 bird species and 30–55 kinds of mammals in intact forest." The defoliation devastated habitats for keystone species, creating a ripple effect throughout the ecosystem throwing off ecological balance. The uncertain long-term effects of these herbicides are now being discovered by looking at modified species distribution patterns through habitat degradation and loss in wetland systems, which absorbed the runoff from the mainland. The destruction of forests in Vietnam War is one of the most commonly used examples of ecocide, including by Swedish Prime Minister Olof Palme, lawyers, historians and other academics.

=== War in Afghanistan (1979-2021) ===
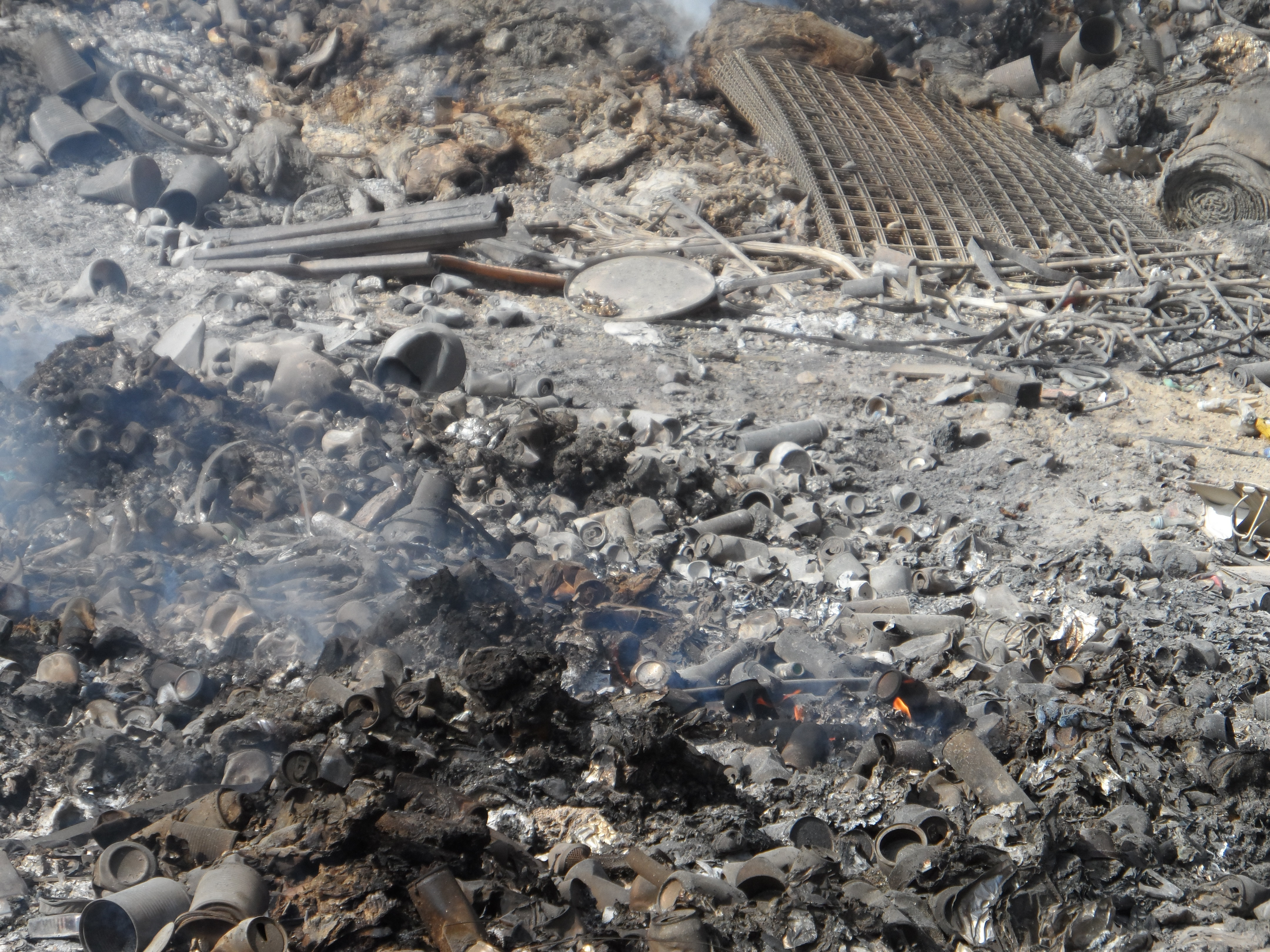
Open-air burn pit at Forward Operating Base Sharana, Paktika, Afghanistan, in 2013

The ongoing environmental impacts of war in Afghanistan, from the 1979 beginning of the Soviet-Afghan War to the 2021 United States' withdrawal from Afghanistan, adversely affect the health of Afghan civilians and American veterans, infrastructure, the labour force, and social structures. Environmental impacts involve but are not limited to the open-air burn pits of the United States Department of Defense (DoD) and the degradation of traditional irrigation systems. The burn pits produced hazardous emissions inconclusively linked to later appearances of chronic and sometimes fatal illness. Irrigation impacts—significant due to the dryness of the land—have been catalyzed by military activity and the societal effects of conflict; they have contributed to the rise of Afghan opium production.

=== Gulf War (1991) and Iraq War (2003-2011) ===
During the 1991 Gulf War, the Kuwaiti oil fires were a result of the scorched earth policy of Iraqi forces retreating from Kuwait. The Gulf War oil spill, regarded as the worst oil spill in history, was caused when Iraqi forces opened valves at the Sea Island oil terminal and dumped oil from several tankers into the Persian Gulf. Oil was also dumped in the middle of the desert.

Just before the 2003 Iraq War, Iraq also set fire to various oil fields.

Some American military personnel complained of Gulf War syndrome, typified by symptoms including immune system disorders and birth defects in their children. Whether it is due to time spent in active service during the war or for other reasons remains controversial.

Iraq's water supply was heavily contaminated due to the war, with the effects of oil from military vehicles as well as depleted uranium ammunition. The chemicals used in the ecoterrorist attack affected the shore line of Saudi Arabia. All of the natural resources that were filled within 34 kilometers become contaminated, with visible damages that are apparent to this day.

The intentional oil spills and burning of oil wells during this period had extreme effects on coastal and marine species, enduring long-term consequences in habitat fragmentation, sediment and soil contamination, and species diversity. As a result of this, the avian ecosystem took a major hit. Their levels of intake became too high, and the constant oiling of their feathers would constantly cripple them, seabirds and waders in particular. The Gulf War resulted in the populations of many species to dwindle and die, with a large decrease that ranged from 20 to 50 percent. Almost every bird in the time period and region was affected by the oil spills and it resulted in the deaths of around 100,000 waders.

=== 2006 Lebanon War ===
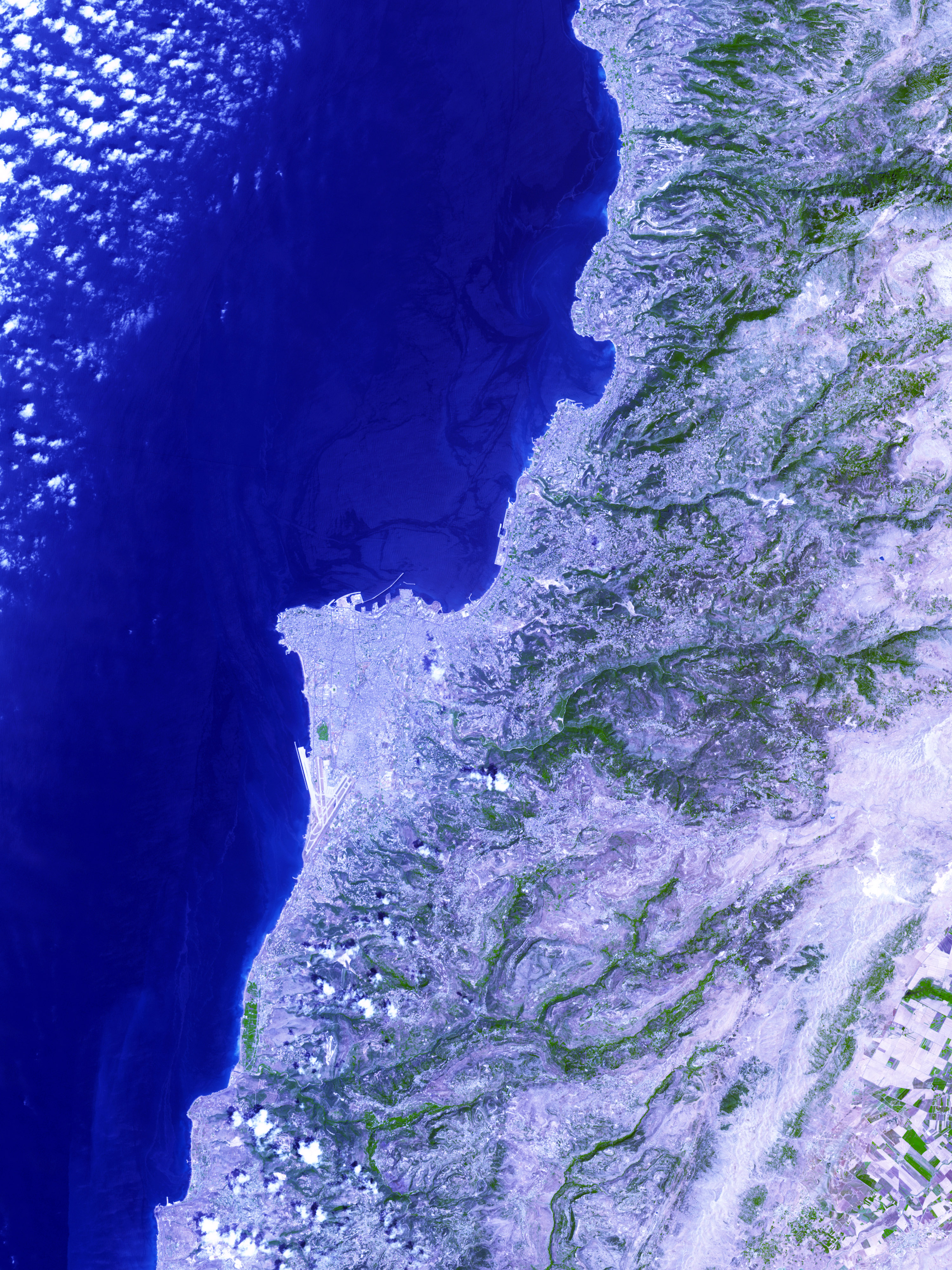
Nasa image of spill, taken August 10, 2006. Oil slick in darker blue.

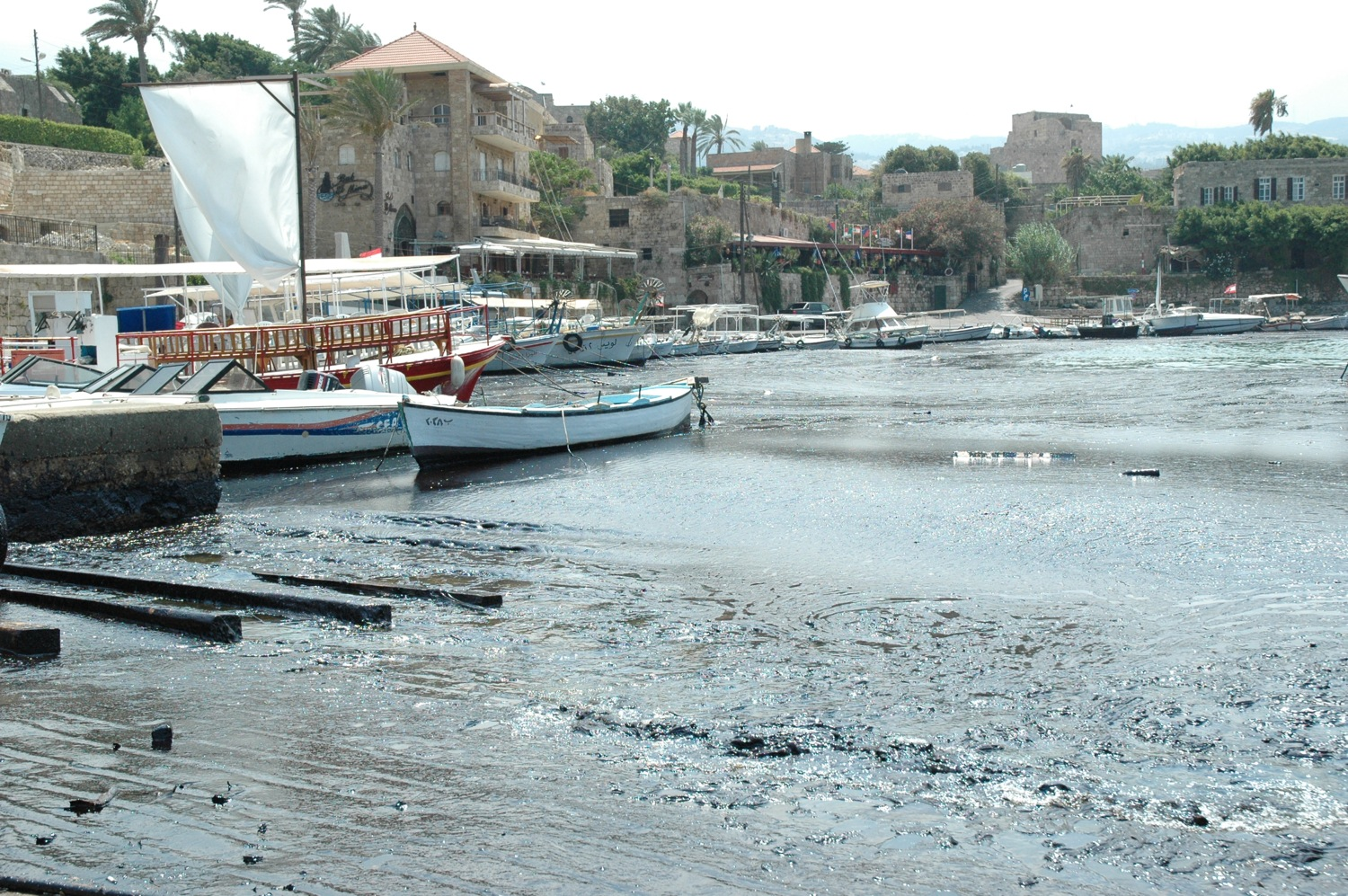
The oil-polluted water washing into the harbour of Byblos.

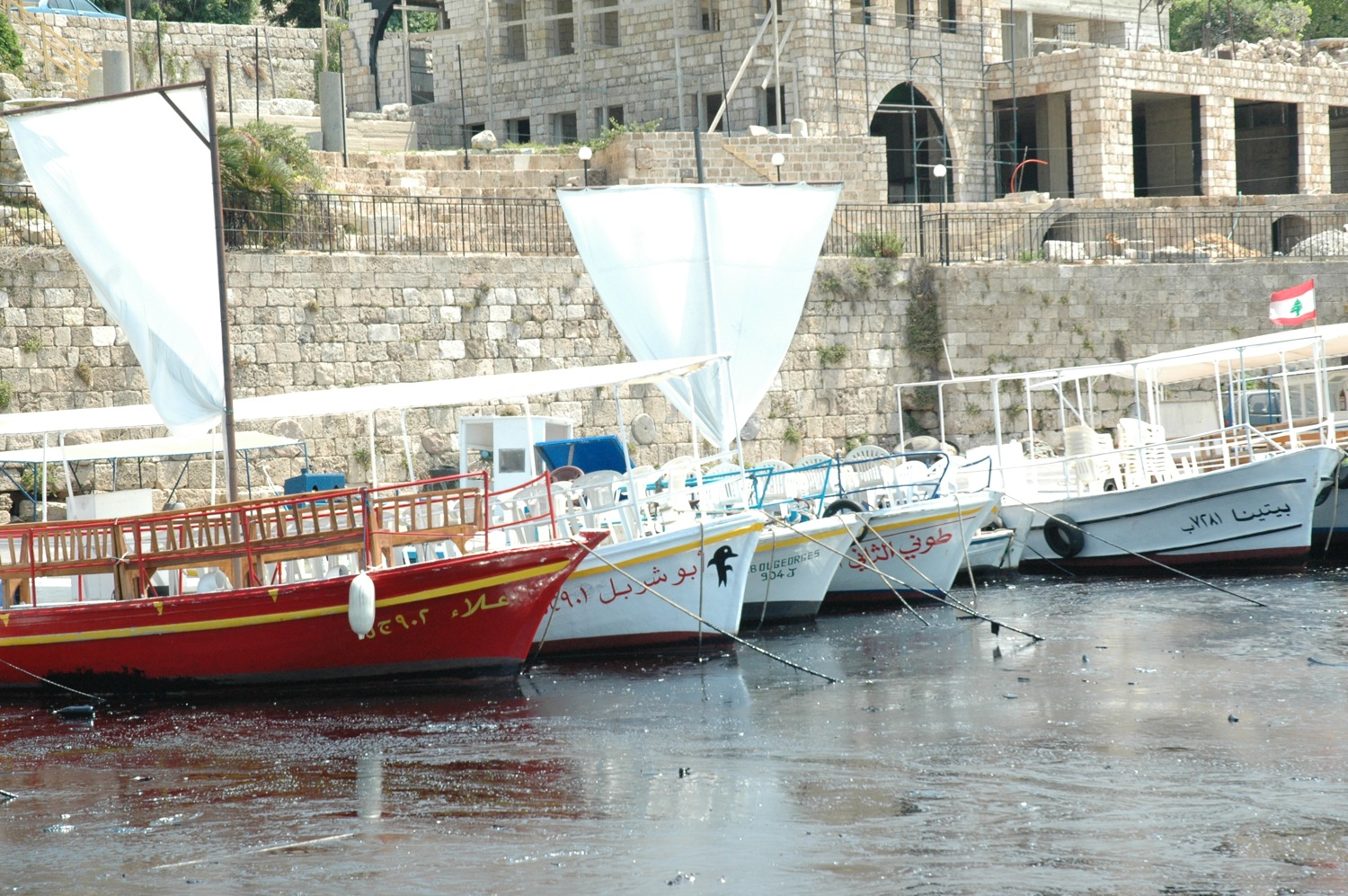
The oil spillage caused by the Jiyeh bombings in mid July, had by 29 July coated the whole water surface in Byblos harbour, some 60 km north of Jiyeh.

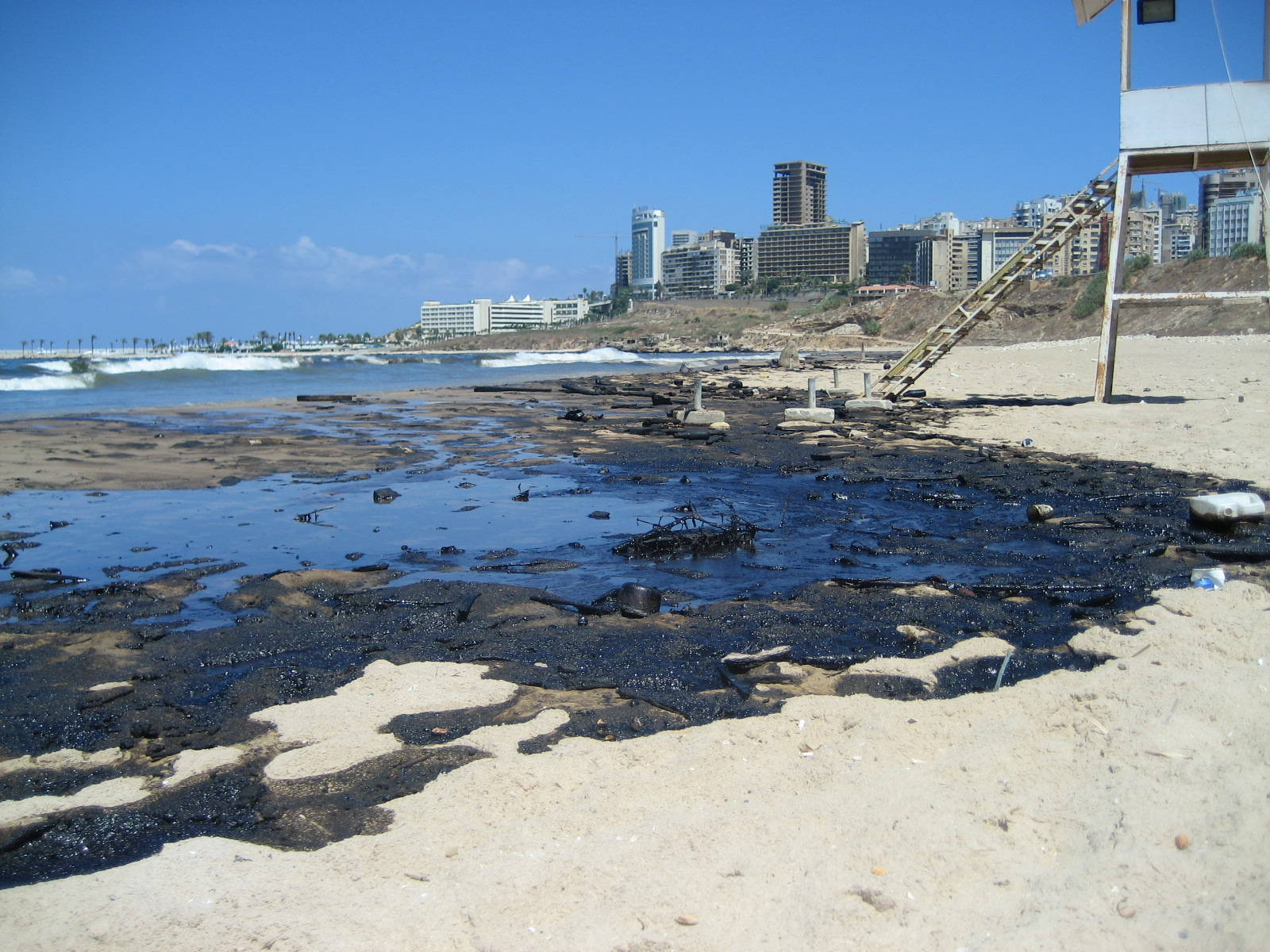
Oil from the bombed power plant of Jieh contaminating the beaches of Beirut

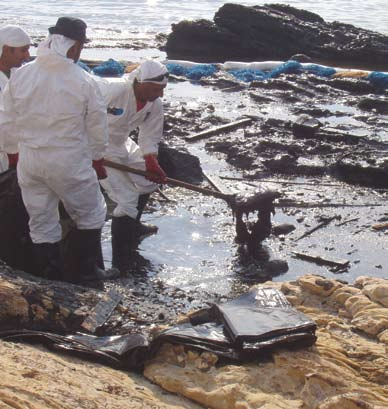
Workers clean up oil spill in 2006

The Jiyeh Power Station oil spill was an environmental disaster caused by the release of heavy fuel oil into the eastern Mediterranean after storage tanks at the thermal power station in Jiyeh, Lebanon, 30 km (19 mi) south of Beirut, were bombed by the Israeli Air force on July 14 and July 15, 2006 during the 2006 Israel-Lebanon conflict. The plant's damaged tanks leaked up to 30,000 tonnes of oil into the eastern Mediterranean Sea, A 10 km wide oil slick covered 170 km of coastline, and threatened Turkey and Cyprus. The slick killed fish, threatened the habitat of endangered green sea turtles, and potentially increased the risk of cancer.

Although Al Jazeera compared the scale of the oil spill to that of the Exxon Valdez oil spill, later assessment found that the volume spilled was 15 000 - 30 000 tonnes compared to 42 000 tonnes for the Exxon Valdez oil spill. The coastline affected was between 150–170 km, while the Exxon Valdez oil spill affected 2,100 km of coastline.

According to Lebanon's Environment Minister Yacoub Sarraf, Israeli jets deterred firemen from putting out the fire at the storage units, which continued for 10 days, and the Israeli Navy blockade stopped Lebanese and foreign officials from surveying the damage of the spill.

Beyond coastal pollution, the 2006 Lebanon War also disrupted agricultural livelihoods in Southern Lebanon. Anthropologist Munira Khayyat documents how fighting devastated villages in the Bint Jbeil district during the tobacco-growing season, causing losses for farming households.

Khayyat also describes how residents of souther Lebanese villages resumed agricultural activities and reconstruction after the 2006 ceasefire. Farming remained central to rebuilding everyday life, showing how recovery from war involves not only restoring infrastructure but also maintaining relationships between communities and agricultural landscapes.

In southern Lebanon, tobacco cultivation has remained an important livelihood. Khayyat explains that tobacco's suitability for relatively dry conditions, limited infrastructure requirements and access to a state-regulated purchasing system have helped sustain farming households.

=== Russian invasion of Ukraine (2022-) ===
The Russian invasion of Ukraine has led to ongoing widespread and possibly serious and long-term environmental damage. The Ukrainian government, journalists and international observers describe the damage as ecocide.

Explosions inflict toxic damage along with physical destruction. Every explosion releases particles of toxic substances such as lead, mercury and depleted uranium into the environment. When ingested, explosives like TNT, DNT, and RDX, cause illness.

Fights in heavily industrialised areas may lead to technological disasters, such as spills of tailings and fuel, that poison vast territories not only in Ukraine, but also in Europe and Russia. Destroyed buildings may release carcinogenic dust that remains hazardous for decades. Heavy metals and chemicals may penetrate underground waters and poison water sources, killing life in rivers and water bodies. Destruction of civil infrastructure has already left more than four million people without access to clean drinking water. Soils in some areas of military conflict are no longer fit for agriculture, because plants draw up and accumulate the pollutants.

War also increases the risk of nuclear accidents. Power shortages at nuclear plants and fights in the vicinity of stations may result in disasters with impacts similar to Chernobyl and Fukushima. Military emissions of CO_{2} reach hundreds of million tonnes and undermine the goals of the Paris Agreement.

More than 12,000 square kilometres (4,600 sq mi) of Ukraine's nature reserves have become a war zone. Populations of rare endemic and migrant species have already suffered great losses, and birds have been forced to abandon nests and change their usual migration routes. The efforts of decades-long conservation projects have been ruined.

Estimating the total environmental damage inflicted by the war is not possible until it ends. According to preliminary data, it will take Ukraine's nature at least 15 years to recover.

According to Daniel Hubé, engineer at BRGM and author of a thesis on the environmental legacy of wars, the environmental consequences of the conflict will likely extend over several centuries. The front line, far wider than during the First World War, generates a vastly larger contaminated area. In addition, mines cover approximately 175,000 km², and clearing them could require up to fifty years of effort mobilising all global resources.

=== Gaza War (2023-) ===
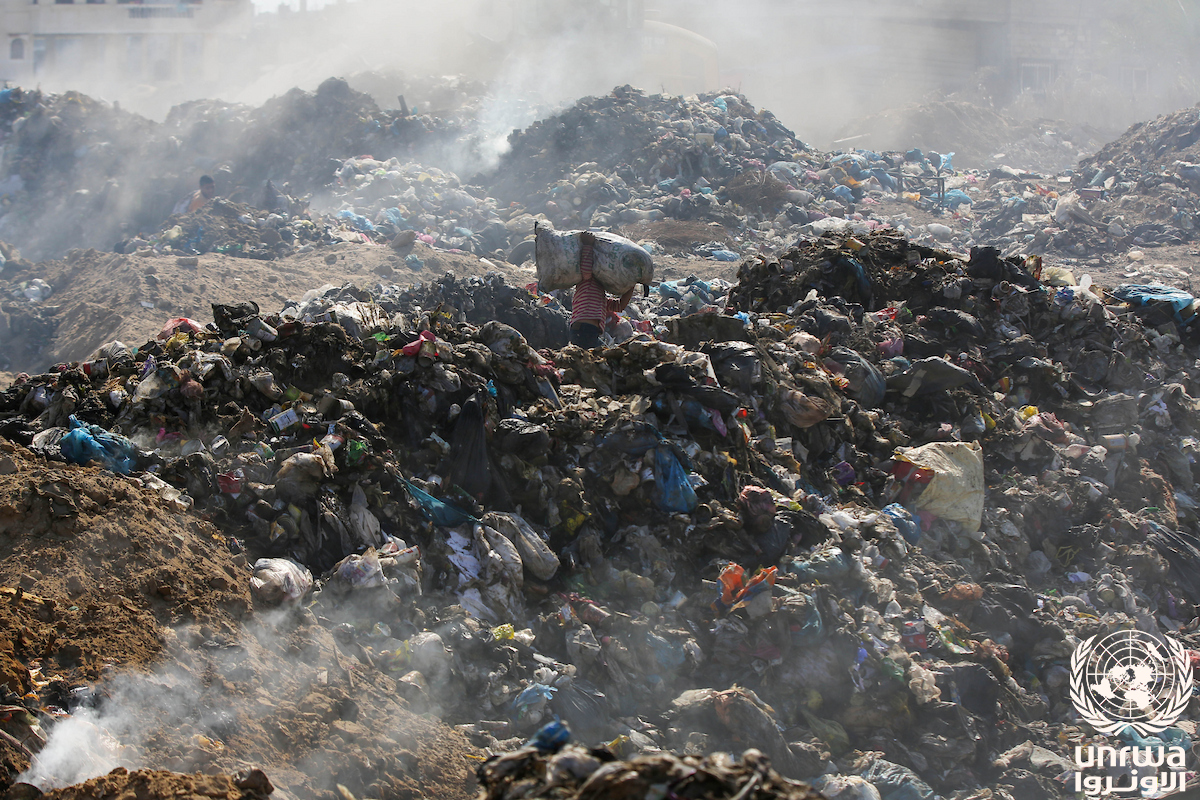
Accumulated waste in Gaza

There has been extensive environmental damage caused by the ongoing Israeli invasion of the Gaza Strip (itself a part of the Gaza war), including the destruction of agricultural land, displacement of people, bombing of Gaza, the Israeli blockade, and famine in the Gaza Strip. By March 2024, nearly half of the farmland in Gaza had been destroyed, and by the following January 80% of the tree cover had been destroyed.

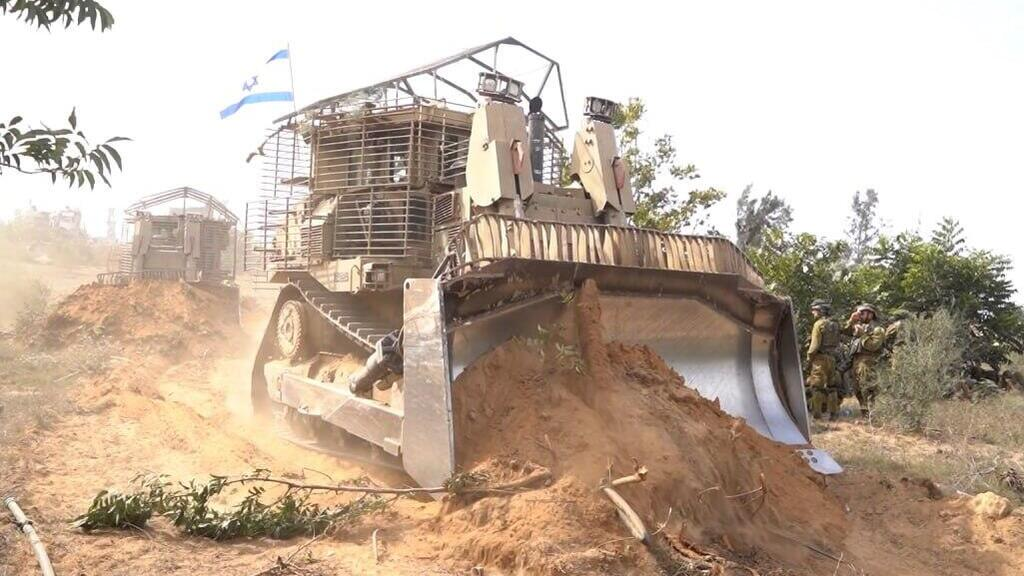
IDF bulldozer clearing trees in Gaza in October 2023

Israeli bombardment and the blockade have led to a total collapse of Gaza's civil infrastructure, including sewage treatment, waste disposal, water management, and fuel supplies. Water has been polluted by 130,000 cubic metres of sewage being discharged into the sea every day due to Israel cutting off fuel supplies. Groundwater has been contaminated by toxins and munitions and air has been polluted by smoke and particulates from bombing. Soils have been degraded by uprooting trees and contaminated by toxins, munitions, heavy bombing and demolitions. Bombing by the Israeli army has created 50 million tonnes of debris and hazardous material, much of which contains human remains and tens of thousands of bombs. In June 2024, northern Gaza was described as a "wasteland", unable to sustain life.

The size and lasting impact of the systematic and intentional destruction of agriculture in Gaza have led to calls by the research group Forensic Architecture at Goldsmiths, University of London, and the Palestinian Environmental NGOs Network for the Israeli Government to be investigated for the Rome Statute war crime of ecocide for "widespread, long-term and severe damage to the natural environment".

=== Israel–Iran conflict (2025) ===
During the conflict major oil and gas complexes were damaged and large scale disruption in oil supply can emerge. This completely reversed the projections of the International Energy Agency made in the "Global Energy Review 2025," about a decrease in oil consumption growth due to shift toward renewables and EVs. Higher oil prices can slow the shift to renewables, because in this situation, fossil fuels are a "necessity" hedge against instability.

=== Iran war (2026) ===
The disruptions caused by the Iran blocking of the strait of Hormuz has led South Korea to lift its ban on coal fired power energy generation. CEOBS, a British non profit has noted that the war has led countries to search for a long term strategy to reduce risk and guarantee energy security by diversifying energy sources to include more renewable energy sources. In the same time the high oil prices driven by wars in the Middle East, including Iran, created a surge in profits of oil companies, pushing them to increase production - the opposite of what is needed to fulfill the Paris climate agreement. The planned expansion is much worse than the International Energy Agency’s business-as-usual scenario - a 5.9% increase in oil and gas production this decade, leading to a catastrophic 2.9C global temperature increase. Major oil companies want to increase production by 14% during 2026-2030 in average. For limit temperature rise to 1.5-2 degrees above preindustrial level oil production must fall this decade. CEOBS has said that Iranian attacks on the gulf states and merchant ships increases risks of an environmental incident in the Persian Gulf. CEOBS also said that US-Israeli and Iranian attacks on military infrastructure leads to the release of dangerous chemicals based in the vicinity or within military installations. CEOBS cited multiple environmental threats in potential attacks by the US and Israel on Nuclear facilities or Iranian attacks on water desalination plants

Due to both large-scale hydrocarbon bomb combustion and gun munition residues, the war has also created a complex, multi-layered contaminant system. This system affects groundwater, soil, and the atmosphere, posing both short and long-term environmental risks.

Also a study published in Advances in Atmospheric Sciences reported that fires caused by Israeli strikes on Tehran oil facilities on 7 March 2026 released nearly 30 kilotons of sulfur dioxide and spread toxic fumes across about 300,000 square kilometers, roughly the size of Italy. Satellite imagery showed that some of the fires continued burning for days after the strikes, while smoke and “black rain” raised concerns about respiratory illnesses, contaminated water supplies, and long-term environmental damage. Nature Sustainability condemned military strikes on civilian energy infrastructure, warning that the environmental and public health impacts could persist for decades.

Researchers have expressed concerns on how the war could impact wildlife and conservation efforts within Iran. Iran’s Environment Department lists 86 of the county's animal species as being endangered, and it is likely that the conflict has placed further risks on the country's fragile biodiversity, which has already been negatively impacted by climate change and the impact of international sanctions on conservation efforts.

=== Africa ===
Throughout Africa, war has been a major factor in the decline of wildlife populations inside national parks and other protected areas. However, a growing number of ecological restoration initiatives, including in Rwanda's Akagera National Park and Mozambique's Gorongosa National Park, have successfully rehabilitated wildlife populations and whole ecosystems even after devastating conflicts. Experts have emphasized that solving social, economic, and political problems is essential for the success of such efforts.

==== Rwanda (1994) ====
The Rwandan genocide led to the killing of roughly 800,000 Tutsis and moderate Hutus. The war created a massive migration of nearly 2 million Hutus fleeing Rwanda over the course of just a few weeks to refugee camps in Tanzania and the Democratic Republic of the Congo. This large displacement of people in refugee camps puts pressure on the surrounding ecosystem. Forests were cleared in order to provide wood for building shelters and creating cooking fires: The refugees "suffered from harsh conditions and constituted an important threat impact to natural resources." Consequences from the conflict also included the degradation of National Parks and Reserves. The population crash in Rwanda shifted personnel and capital to other parts of the country, thereby making it hard to protect wildlife.

=== Other examples ===
- 1938 Yellow River flood, created by the Nationalist government in Central China during the early stages of the Second Sino-Japanese War in an attempt to halt the rapid advance of the Japanese forces. It has been called the "largest act of environmental warfare in history".
- Beaufort's Dyke, used as a dumping ground for bombs
- Jiyeh Power Station oil spill, bombed by the Israeli Air Force during the 2006 Israel-Lebanon conflict.
- Formerly Used Defense Sites, a U.S. military program which is responsible for environmental restoration
- K5 Plan, an attempt by the government of the People's Republic of Kampuchea to seal off Khmer Rouge guerrilla infiltration routes into Cambodia between 1985 and 1989, resulting in environmental degradation.
- Saudi Arabian-led intervention in Yemen, an intervention in a civil war in the Middle East, disrupted the water-energy-food security nexus in an already resource-poor country. The war and the conflict led to the contamination of water and agricultural lands.

== Environmental hazards ==
Resources are a key source of conflict between nations: "after the end of the Cold War in particular, many have suggested that environmental degradation will exacerbate scarcities and become an additional source of armed conflict." A nation's survival depends on resources from the environment. Resources that are a source of armed conflict include territory, strategic raw materials, sources of energy, water, and food. In order to maintain resource stability, chemical and nuclear warfare have been used by nations in order to protect or extract resources, and during conflict. These agents of war have been used frequently: "about 125,000 tons of chemical agent were employed during World War I, and about 96,000 tons during the Viet-Nam conflict." Nerve gas, also known as organophosphorous anticholinesterases, was used at lethal levels against human beings and destroyed a high number of nonhuman vertebrate and invertebrate populations. However, contaminated vegetation would mostly be spared, and would only pose a threat to herbivores. The result of innovations in chemical warfare led to a broad range of different chemicals for war and domestic use, but also resulted in unforeseen environmental damage.

The progression of warfare and its effects on the environment continued with the invention of weapons of mass destruction. While today, weapons of mass destruction act as deterrents and the use of weapons of mass destruction during World War II created significant environmental destruction. On top of the great loss in human life, "natural resources are usually the first to suffer: forests and wild life animals are wiped out." Nuclear warfare imposes both direct and indirect effects on the environment. The physical destruction due to the blast or by the biospheric damage due to ionizing radiation or radiotoxicity directly affect ecosystems within the blast radius. Also, the atmospheric or geospheric disturbances caused by the weapons can lead to weather and climate changes.

=== Unexploded ordnance ===
Military campaigns require large quantities of explosive weapons, a fraction of which will not detonate properly and leave unexploded weapons. This creates a serious physical and chemical hazard for the civilian populations living in areas which were once war zones, due to the possibility of detonation after the conflict, as well as the leaching of chemicals into the soil and groundwater.

Unexploded ordnance pose a threat to both construction activities and tunneling activities. This threat primarily exists in the United Kingdom, where many unexploded ordnance remain, leftover from World War I and II. If these unexploded ordnance were to explode, they pose the same level of threat to civilian populations just as they did during the war that they were used in, including a blast wave and shrapnel. Many unexploded ordnance are located at a depth ranging from 6 meters to 20 meters, with the depth these unexploded ordnance reach depending on multiple factors.

During the Vietnam war, There was a secret bombing that was left untouched in the country of Laos in the XeingKhouang Province. The bombing took place in 1964, and consisted of 260 million bombs being dropped all over the area, with residue being left behind, it was reported that there was at least one or more casualties or injuries every other day due to the Unexploded Ordnance's, and these would mainly pertain to children of the ages 15 and below.

=== Agent Orange ===
Agent Orange was one of the herbicides and defoliants used by the British military during the Malayan Emergency in the early 1950s and the U.S. military in its herbicidal warfare program, Operation Ranch Hand, during the Vietnam War. An estimated 21,136,000 gal. (80 000 m^{3}) of Agent Orange were sprayed across South Vietnam. According to the Vietnamese government, 4.8 million Vietnamese people were exposed to Agent Orange, and this exposure resulted in 400,000 deaths and disabilities as well as 500,000 children born with birth defects. The Vietnamese Red Cross estimates that up to one million people were disabled or have health problems as a result of Agent Orange.

Many Commonwealth personnel who handled or used Agent Orange during and decades after the 1948–1960 Malayan conflict suffered from serious exposure to dioxins. Agent Orange also caused soil erosion to areas in Malaya. An estimated 10,000 civilians and insurgents in Malaya also suffered from the effects of defoliants, though many historians agreed it was likely more than 10,000 given that Agent Orange was used on a large scale in the Malayan Emergency and unlike the U.S., the British government manipulated the numbers and kept its deployment a secret in fear of a negative backlash from foreign nations.

The soil erosion mixed in with the soil animals that keep it vibrant like ants, termites and centipedes altered the soil fertility and the carbon output in the atmosphere. Long term exposure to Agent Orange would result in changes in the local, urbanization development, agricultural, industrial lifestyle and so many other factors that sustain the environment. Long term exposure to Agent Orange has proven to have evolutionary properties to exposed wild animals, as well as modify their genetic DNA, all the while being able to spread throughout lakes, rivers, and forest terrains. The dioxin chemicals ingested by domesticated animals could potentially transfer Agent Orange to humans, as it is stored with their fat, and tolerance levels leveled from 50 to 60 years.

=== Testing of nuclear armaments ===
Testing of nuclear armaments has been carried out at various places including Bikini Atoll, the Marshall Islands Pacific Proving Grounds, New Mexico in the US, Mururoa Atoll, Maralinga in Australia, and Novaya Zemlya in the former Soviet Union, among others.

Many of the sites where nuclear armaments have been tested have both radioactively polluted water and soil. Strontium, plutonium, and uranium can all be released into the environment along with numerous other pollutants such as benzene and mercury.

Downwinders are individuals and communities who are exposed to radioactive contamination or nuclear fallout from atmospheric or underground nuclear weapons testing, and nuclear accidents.

Numerous negative health impacts exist from exposure to radiation due to nuclear armaments testing. One of the largest threats is the development of thyroid cancer, a health implication that primarily impacts individuals exposed to radiation during childhood. The threat of radiation exposure from nuclear armaments testing not only disproportionately impacts children but also those living closest to the site of the test. In the case of the United States of America, numerous residents of Nevada as well as the Marshall Islands have received much larger doses of radiation from the nuclear armaments testing that has taken place there. The testing of nuclear armaments in the Marshall Islands disproportionately impacts Marshallese people, as they make up the majority of the population on the Marshall Islands.

A movement to ban the testing of nuclear weapons, called the Comprehensive Nuclear-Test-Ban Treaty, was adopted by the United Nations in September 1996. The treaty has been ratified by one hundred and seventy eight states as of 2024, with Papua New Guinea being the most recent state to ratify the treaty.

=== Strontium-90 ===
The United States government studied the post-war effects of Strontium-90, a radioactive isotope which is found in nuclear fallout. The Atomic Energy Commission discovered that "Sr-90, which is chemically similar to calcium, can accumulate in bones and possibly lead to cancer". Sr-90 finds its way into humans through the ecological food chain as fallout in the soil, picked up by plants, further concentrated in herbivorous animals, and eventually consumed by humans.

Strontium-90 is considered one of the most dangerous radioactive elements. This is because it is highly radiotoxic and it has a very long half-life. In addition to polluting the soil, Strontium-90 can also pollute water, such as oceans and rivers. Strontium-90 is highly dangerous for marine life.

The chemical is so powerful, that it was rumored to be one of the causes that lead to the Fukushima nuclear accident in 2011. Samples were taken around the plant in 2005 and high levels of concentrated Strontium-90 was found covering the Fukushima Dai-ichi Nuclear power station, with levels of the element rising and even exceeding prior levels after the samples were collected 7 years prior.

=== Depleted uranium munitions ===
The use of depleted uranium in munitions is controversial because of numerous questions about potential long-term health effects. Normal functioning of the kidney, brain, liver, heart, and numerous other systems can be affected by uranium exposure, because in addition to being weakly radioactive, uranium is a toxic metal. It remains weakly radioactive because of its long half-life. The aerosol produced during impact and combustion of depleted uranium munitions can potentially contaminate wide areas around the impact sites or can be inhaled by civilians and military personnel. In a three-week period of conflict in Iraq during 2003, it was estimated over 1000 tons of depleted uranium munitions were used mostly in cities. The U.S. Department of Defense claims that no human cancer of any type has been seen as a result of exposure to either natural or depleted uranium.

Yet, U.S. DoD studies using cultured cells and laboratory rodents continue to suggest the possibility of leukemogenic, genetic, reproductive, and neurological effects from chronic exposure.

In addition, the UK Pensions Appeal Tribunal Service in early 2004 attributed birth defect claims from a February 1991 Gulf War combat veteran to depleted uranium poisoning. Campaign Against Depleted Uranium (Spring, 2004) Also, a 2005 epidemiology review concluded: "In aggregate the human epidemiological evidence is consistent with increased risk of birth defects in offspring of persons exposed to DU."

According to a 2011 study by Alaani et al., depleted uranium exposure was either a primary cause or related to the cause of the birth defect and cancer increases. According to a 2012 journal article by Al-Hadithi et al., existing studies and research evidence does not show a "clear increase in birth defects" or a "clear indication of a possible environmental exposure including depleted uranium". The article further states that "there is actually no substantial evidence that genetic defects can arise from parental exposure to DU in any circumstances."

=== Fossil fuel use ===
With the high degree of mechanization of the military large amounts of fossil fuels are used. Fossil fuels are a major contributor to global warming and climate change, issues of increasing concern. Access to oil resources is also a factor for instigating a war.

The United States Department of Defense (DoD) is a government body with the highest use of fossil fuel in the world. According to the 2005 CIA World Factbook, when compared with the consumption per country the DoD would rank 34th in the world in average daily oil use, coming in just behind Iraq and just ahead of Sweden.

=== Waste incineration ===
At U.S. bases during the 21st-century wars in Iraq and Afghanistan, human waste was burned in open pits along with munitions, plastic, electronics, paint, and other chemicals. The carcinogenic smoke is suspected to have injured some soldiers exposed to it.

The smoke from these burn pits can potentially cause respiratory and cardiovascular disease. The threat of exposure to the smoke from these burn pits impacts both military as well as civilian populations. The threat that the exposure to this smoke poses depends on multiple factors, including the duration of exposure, wind direction, and the materials that are being incinerated. The United States Military now discourages waste disposal using open burn pits, recommending that they only be used in emergency situations. Additionally, there are also certain items that are now prohibited from being burned. Open air burn pits are still used today by military forces as well as civilian populations in places that do not have adequate solid waste disposal services.

=== Intentional flooding ===
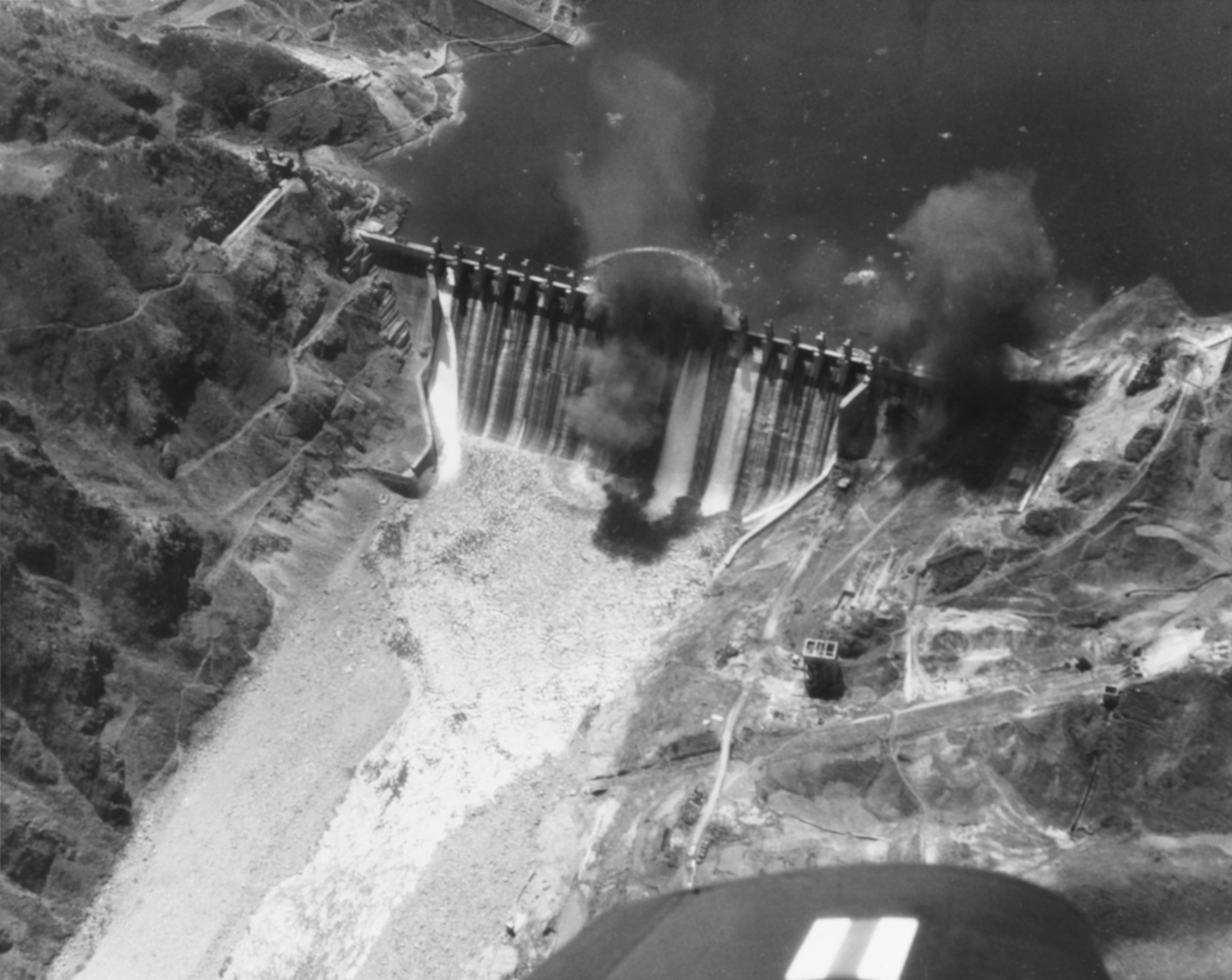
Intentional flooding made to deny the enemy the tactical use of controlled flooding on the Pukhan and Han rivers (Korean War).

Flooding can be used as scorched earth policy through using water to render land unusable. It can also be used to prevent the movement of enemy combatants. During the Second Sino-Japanese War, dykes on the Yellow and the Yangtze Rivers were breached to halt the advance of Japanese forces. During the Siege of Leiden in 1573, the dykes were breached to halt the advance of Spanish forces. During Operation Chastise during the Second World War, the Eder and Sorpe river dams in Germany were bombed by the Royal Air Force, flooding a large area and halting industrial manufacture used by the Germans in the war effort.

=== Targeting of chemical and industrial facilities ===
The targeting of chemical and industrial facilities in warfare can result in multiple negative environmental impacts. Depending on the type of facility, multiple chemicals and other dangerous substances can enter the environment which can pose a wide array of negative impacts. For example, the River Dunbae became heavily contaminated after airstrikes targeting oil and chemical facilities caused oil and chemical leaks during the Kosovo War. The targeting of oil fields and refineries also impacts the atmosphere, with large amounts of carbon dioxide as well as sulphur, mercury, and dioxins being released. Nearly half a million tons of carbon dioxide were released from the Gulf War, in which many oil fields were burned.

== Militarism and the environment ==
Human security has traditionally been solely linked to military activities and defense. Scholars and institutions like the International Peace Bureau are now increasingly calling for a more holistic approach to security, particularly including an emphasis on the interconnections and interdependencies that exist between humans and the environment. Military activity has significant impacts on the environment. Not only can war be destructive to the socioenvironment, but military activities produce extensive amounts of greenhouse gases (that contribute to anthropogenic climate change), pollution, and cause resource depletion, among other environmental impacts.

=== Animals ===
Cetacea have been a major casualty of the 2022 Russian invasion of Ukraine, with more than 50,000 thought to have been killed. The heavy presence of sonar emanating from naval ships on the Black Sea impacts mammals' ability to use echolocation and subsequently impacts their hunting capabilities.

There are also reported impacts on animal behaviour that can cause sublethal fitness costs, with greater spotted eagles flying up to an additional 250 km on migration to avoid areas of conflict in Ukraine.

During the Tigray war of 2020, it was reported over 12 million cattle, goats, donkeys, and other animals were caught in the crossfire and killed, as well as over a billion dollars' worth of damages.

When Agent Orange struck, as part of the Vietnam War in the 1960s, trees were killed and the land dried up, causing many nutrients in the ecosystem to disappear, leaving no viable habitat for animals. Additionally, the chemicals in Agent Orange were shown to cause toxic effects in animals, often leading to a delayed death.

=== Greenhouse gas emissions and pollution ===
==== Emissions from wars and warfare ====
A report made by The Conflict and Environment Observatory (CEOBS) and the Scientists for Global Responsibility estimated the global carbon footprint of the military sector as 5.5% of global emissions, which are not measured and not included in GHG assessments on global and country level. This estimate does not include the emissions from the conflicts themselves. The war in Ukraine alone in the first 2 years, released more emissions than Netherlands in 1 year. This report also did not include the impact of exhaust gases from aviation in the stratosphere (currently a factor of 1.9 is applied to emissions from aviation because of this effect) and a possibility of non-exact reporting.

Military emissions are so much underreported, that some research suggest their actual scale can be 10 times higher than officially declared. A special site was created for estimate the gap between reported and real emissions, by country. Doctor Soroush Abolfathi, a panellist at the Global Institute for Tomorrow conference, estimated real war emissions as 15%–20% of global.

The greenhouse gas emissions intensity of military spendings is 125% higher in comparison to non-military, so "Each dollar allocated to the military generates more than twice the greenhouse gas emissions of a dollar spent elsewhere." If the global military expenditure as a percentage of GDP (MILEX) ratio is 12% or higher, global temperature will not decline below 1.5 degrees even by 2100, if it is 24% or higher, the temperature will not decline below 2 degrees.

An increase in 5% in global military spending, will delay the point in which the global temperature will decline below 1.5 degree, by 13 years. An increase of NATO members military spendings to 3.5% from GDP will "cancel out three times all the advanced economies’ efforts to reduce energy-related carbon emissions in 2024 (120 MtCO2e reduction). The additional emissions would also cancel out the annual emission reduction of 134 MtCO2e needed to achieve the EU’s 2030 target of reducing GHG emissions by at least 55% compared with 1990 levels." A report made by the German company Allianz estimated that it can lead, in the EU and the UK alone, to an increase in GHG emissions equivalent to 12% of the emissions of Europe, deleting 18% of the carbon budget of Europe according to the Paris agreement.

A 2021 report tried to analyse the impact of the conflicts themself. It estimated that forests or oil wells burning due to war can easily emit hundreds of millions tons of carbon dioxide, burning a city 10 million and reconstructions in big scale more than 100 million. A war like the Ukraine war can increase emissions in the short term. In the long term it can both increase and decrease them. The reports says: "In the long term, lack of trust could be the largest risk of proliferation of conflicts for international climate policy". The authors end the report by an epilogue in which they are writing: "the initial notion of assessing military activities in a way as potential 'engines of progress' for novel renewable technologies was shattered by the Iraq War followed by the horror of yet another large-scale ground war, this time in Europe, with serious and still unfathomable global implications." As of 2024, there are 56 wars in the world, the biggest number since World War II and their number and intensity are growing. The number of armed conflicts in the last years do not decline below 150.

Additionally, military activities involve high emissions of pollution. The Pentagon's director of environment, safety and occupational health, Maureen Sullivan, has stated that they work with approximately 39,000 contaminated sites. Indeed, the US military is also considered one of the largest generators of pollution in the world. Combined, the top five US chemical companies only produce one fifth of the toxins produced by the Pentagon. In Canada, the Department of National Defence readily admits it is the largest energy consumer of the Government of Canada, and a consumer of "high volumes of hazardous materials".

Military pollution is a worldwide occurrence. Armed forces from around the world were responsible for the emission of two thirds of chlorofluorocarbons (CFCs) that were banned in the 1987 Montreal Protocol for causing damage to the ozone layer. In addition, naval accidents during the Cold War have dropped at minimum 50 nuclear warheads and 11 nuclear reactors into the ocean, they remain on the ocean floor.

==== Impacts of wars on environmental policy ====
Several studies have found a strong positive correlation between military spending and increased greenhouse gas emissions, with the impact of military spending on carbon emissions being more pronounced for countries of the Global North (i.e.: OECD developed countries). Accordingly, the US military is estimated to be the number one fossil fuel consumer in the world. Peaceful countries have, in average, 12% higher environmental performance score in comparison to countries in war, and long-term peaceful countries have 15% higher score in comparison to states which ended conflicts in the last 20 years. The negative impact of conflicts on environmental policy can last 20–30 years. Wars does not affect only some specific environmentals domains and countries, but reduces environmental performance globally and across different environmental indicators.

Wars divert resources from climate action. For example, in 2025 EU countries diverted billions from climate action to military, what in compound with the withdrawal of the USA, is putting in danger the agreement about 300 billions dollars per year for climate action achieved in COP29. According to Bloomberg: ""The S&P Global Clean Energy Index has lost about 40% of its value since Russia invaded Ukraine in February 2022. The S&P Global 1200 Aerospace & Defense Index climbed 64% in the same period,".

Wars and geopolitical tensions harm climate action, including by preventing just distribution of needed resources. Climate change can increase conflicts, creating a "Doom Loop". As of 2024, this process began to be felt more strongly.

Conflicts raise carbon emissions. This is especially clear with the War in Ukraine which led to reduction in climate action. One of the results is a deterioration of human health.

When a war lead to rise in fossil fuel prices, this mean that "energy security concerns will once again trump energy transition initiatives, entrenching the power of fossil fuel interests worldwide", while reducing the ability of countries to spend money on climate. Generally this can make countries abandone climate action, concentrating instead on security issues.

The growth rate of national climate actions increased by only 1% in 2022, while between 2000 and 2021, it averaged 10%. That slowdown poses a risk to countries’ climate policies. Geopolitical, macroeconomic shocks, created an energy crisis. As a result climate actions were canceled or postponed and governmental fossil fuel funding reached record levels, topping USD 1 trillion. Some countries, especially in Europe, significantly cut public spending for research into low‑carbon technologies.

A study published in the non profit journal "Climate action" found that war can exacerbate climate change by 8 ways, namely "military vehicle emissions, assets destruction, diverted funds, diverted media coverage, shifted trade relationship, increased self sufficiency, reduced technology transfer, reduced cooperation". The wars in Ukraine and Gaza are described as examples. The study confirmed that war is causing climate change, disrupting mitigation, and climate change is causing more war.

As of 2025, the collapse of net zero networks in the business sector is partially due to the high profitability of fossil fuels. One of the reasons is the increase in energy prices due to the war in Ukraine.

=== Land and resource use ===
Military land use needs (such as for bases, training, storage etc.) often displace people from their lands and homes. Military activity uses solvents, fuels and other toxic chemicals which can leach toxins into the environment that remain there for decades and even centuries. Furthermore, heavy military vehicles can cause damage to soil and infrastructure. Military-caused noise pollution can also diminish the quality of life for nearby communities as well as their ability to rear or hunt animals to support themselves. Advocates raise concerns of environmental racism and environmental injustice as it is largely marginalized communities that are displaced and affected.

Militaries are also highly resource intensive. Weapons and military equipment make up the second largest international trade sector. The International Peace Bureau says that more than fifty percent of the helicopters in the world are for military use, and approximately twenty-five percent of jet fuel consumption is by military vehicles. These vehicles are also extremely inefficient, carbon-intensive, and discharge emissions that are more toxic than those of other vehicles.

=== Activist responses ===
Military funding is, at present, higher than ever before, and activists are concerned about the implication for greenhouse gas emissions and climate change. They advocate for demilitarization, citing the high greenhouse gas emissions and support the redirection of those funds to climate action. In 2023 the world spent about 2.4 trillion dollars on military. It is estimated that it would cost approximately one percent of global GDP yearly until 2030 to reverse the climate crisis. Moreover, activists emphasize the need for prevention and the avoidance of costly clean up. Currently, the expense for cleaning up military contaminated site is at least $500 billion. Finally, activists point to social issues such as extreme poverty and advocate for more funding to be redirected from military expenses to these causes.

Groups working for demilitarization and peace include the International Peace Bureau, Canadian Voice of Women for Peace, The Rideau Institute, Ceasefire.ca, Project Ploughshares, and Codepink. See List of anti-war organizations for more groups. 24 organizations including Fridays For Future International and Scientist Rebellion as well as 61 scientists, endorsed an appeal linking peace, justice and climate. The main idea of the appeal is that we can not stop the ecological crisis without stopping overconsumption and this is impossible as wars continue because GDP is directly linked to military potential. As climate change threaten more or less all, even the billionaires, it is good for all to establish peace and justice. Among the endorsers are Michael Meeropol, Don Trent Jacobs, Tori Tsui, Betsy Rosenberg.

=== War forcing fossil fuel use ===
In 2022, the USA experienced a fracking boom when the war in Ukraine led to a massive increase in approval of new drillings. According to the article in The Guardian, "there is significant political pressure to increase domestic drilling in response to the Russia-Ukraine war". Planned drillings will release 140 billion tonnes (310 trillion pounds) of carbon, four times more than annual global emissions. The same year, the BBC opined that the Russian invasion of Ukraine will disrupt all efforts towards the Paris Agreement goals.

In 2023, many Asian countries have been forced to return to using coal to keep up with energy demands caused by the heat wave in the region, due to the European boycott of Russian oil reducing the availability of liquefied natural gas (LNG). Due to problems with energy supply in 2022, China has begun to strongly increase coal-fired power capacity One of the reasons was the war in Ukraine that led to instability in energy supply including rising prices for metals like lithium.

Fatih Birol, the head of the International Energy Agency talking about the prospects of COP 28 mentioned the war in Ukraine and the international tensions in general as the main barrier for climate action.

A study analyzing different aspects of the environmental impacts of the war in Ukraine found that it seriously disturbed climate action and "The biggest risk in terms of impact lies in the potential diversion of attention and focus toward the reduction of inflation rates and market regulation, potentially pushing the focus away from the urgent fight against climate change".

A 2024 report from the climate group Reclaim Finance, found a sharp rise in natural gas projects in recent years with the war in Ukraine being one of the main causes. The projects could lead to a "climate bomb" equivalent to the annual emissions of all the world's operating coal power plants.

As of December 2024, the war in Ukraine has detrimental effect on global climate action and strongly increased emissions. In January 2025 Ukrainian officials said the war has severely damaged the environment. Except the direct effect it created shortage in food and gas what make other countries to increase production. The war seriously hampered the environmental protection of the Baltic Sea, which can be soon turn into a carbon source due to climate change and environmental degradation. The rhetoric of some green parties in the EU saying that the conflict in Ukraine can "help" the climate is counterproductive, increasing war and consequently increasing emissions.

=== Militaries' positive effects on the environment ===
There are examples from around the world of nations' armed forces aiding in land management and conservation. For example, in Bhuj, India, military forces stationed there helped to reforest the area; in Pakistan, the Army took part in the Billion tree tsunami, working with civilians to reforest land in KPK and Punjab.; in Venezuela, it is part of the National Guard's responsibilities to protect natural resources. Additionally, military endorsement of environmentally friendly technology such as renewable energy may have the potential to generate public support for these technologies. Finally, certain military technologies like GPS and drones are helping environmental scientists, conservationists, ecologists and restoration ecologists conduct better research, monitoring, and remediation.

The impacts of the Russian invasion of Ukraine on fossil fuel demand could be experienced globally.On a small scale, Ukrainians have committed to using more sustainable renewable energy, with nationwide power outages in Ukraine driving public interest and demand for solar power, and the clean energy economy is growing. As of 2023, impacts of the war included greater demand for locally produced energy sources stemming from increased concern over energy security. As fossil fuel deposits are not evenly distributed around the world, this could lead to a greater push for renewable energy forms as these are typically easier to domestically produce and are not as susceptible to the global economy.

== War and environmental law ==
From a legal standpoint, environmental protection during times of war and military activities is addressed partially by international environmental law. Further sources are also found in areas of law such as general international law, the laws of war, human rights law and local laws of each affected country. Several United Nations treaties, including the Fourth Geneva Convention, the 1972 World Heritage Convention and the 1977 Environmental Modification Convention have provisions to limit the environmental impacts of war. There have been recent efforts to amend a fifth crime under International Criminal Court's 1998 Rome Statue effectively define ecocide as a war crime. Additionally, the United Nations Environment Programme has begun doing in-depth evaluations for some current wars that explore the environmental impacts that the war is having with to aid in the creation of a more inclusive assessment of the impacts of the conflict.

The Environmental Modification Convention bans weather warfare, which is the use of weather modification techniques for the purposes of inducing damage or destruction. This treaty has been in force since 1978 and has been ratified by leading military powers.

On the 23 of July 2025, the International Court of Justice issued an advisory opinion, saying that states are obligated to cooperate for stopping climate change and when they not do it, "they incur legal consequences including duties to cease the harmful conduct, guarantee non-repetition, and provide reparation". The advisory opinion included some points that can refer to climate impact of wars, even though some countries asked it to speak about the issue more clearly. For example, Democratic Republic of the Congo in its written statement to the court, wrote about: "incompatibility of military activities and armed conflicts with the objectives of mitigating GHG emissions that States have set".

== See also ==
- Biological warfare
- Chemical warfare
- Deforestation in Myanmar
- Environmental effects of the Syrian Civil War
- Environmental impact of the Russian occupation of Crimea
- Environmental impact of the 2022 Russian invasion of Ukraine
- List of environmental issues
- Nuclear warfare
- Nuclear winter
- Scorched earth
- Subnature
- Treadmill of destruction
- Unconventional warfare
- Well poisoning
- War crimes
