= Treadmill of destruction =

Environmental degradation as a result of war

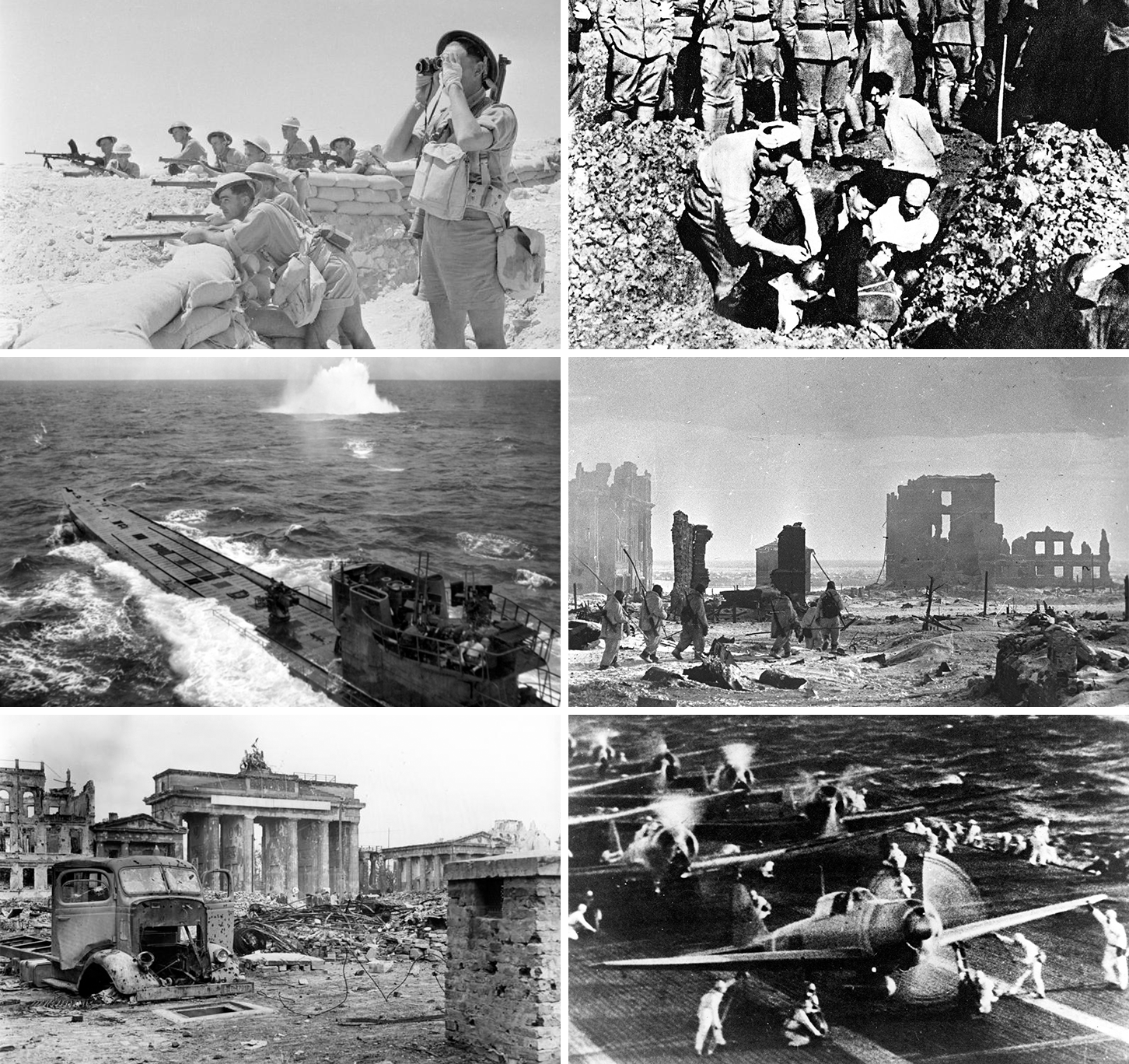
World War II

The treadmill of destruction refers to the global phenomenon that the past and on-going military activities/expenditures and societal-environmental interactions, warrants for the significant degradation of the environment. With the modernization of warfare present today, the rapid advancement of mass destructive weapons, along with the magnitude of the war, signify the amount of major factors to the substantial stress and toll that militarisation has created on co-existing ecosystems and environments.

Although the negative impacts of the environment posed by that militarisation are succinct, societal-environmental interactions have also contributed to the precedent series of environmental crises that society encounters today, which are overlooked and to an extent, ignored.

== History ==
The term treadmill of destruction reflects the consequences to the existence of Allan Schnaiberg's theory of the treadmill of production introduced in 1980. Although this term is not commonly used in society, researchers, sociologists and economists have widely used this coined term to describe and discuss the debt of Schnaiberg's theory for the dynamic expansion of capitalism (militarisation) and economic growth that result in the degradation of the environment.

Since the early 20th century, geopolitical demands from wars have accelerated rates of militarization in the United States. The World Wars, Cold War, Vietnam War, Korean War, Iraq and Afghanistan war are all definite examples of factors that have contributed to the Treadmill of destruction. By doing so, the destructive nature of wars leaves a profound impact on society and poses a threat towards the environment, creating the Tteadmill of destruction.

== Environmental effects of military activities ==
=== Major conventional weapon uses ===
There are many types of weapons which are deployed in military activities and vary in effects they cause. These weapons play a role in being responsible for the environmental damage caused during wars. Although they have different destructive properties, they differ in the effects they cause towards the environment. They include:

==== High explosive fragmentation (HEF) weapons ====
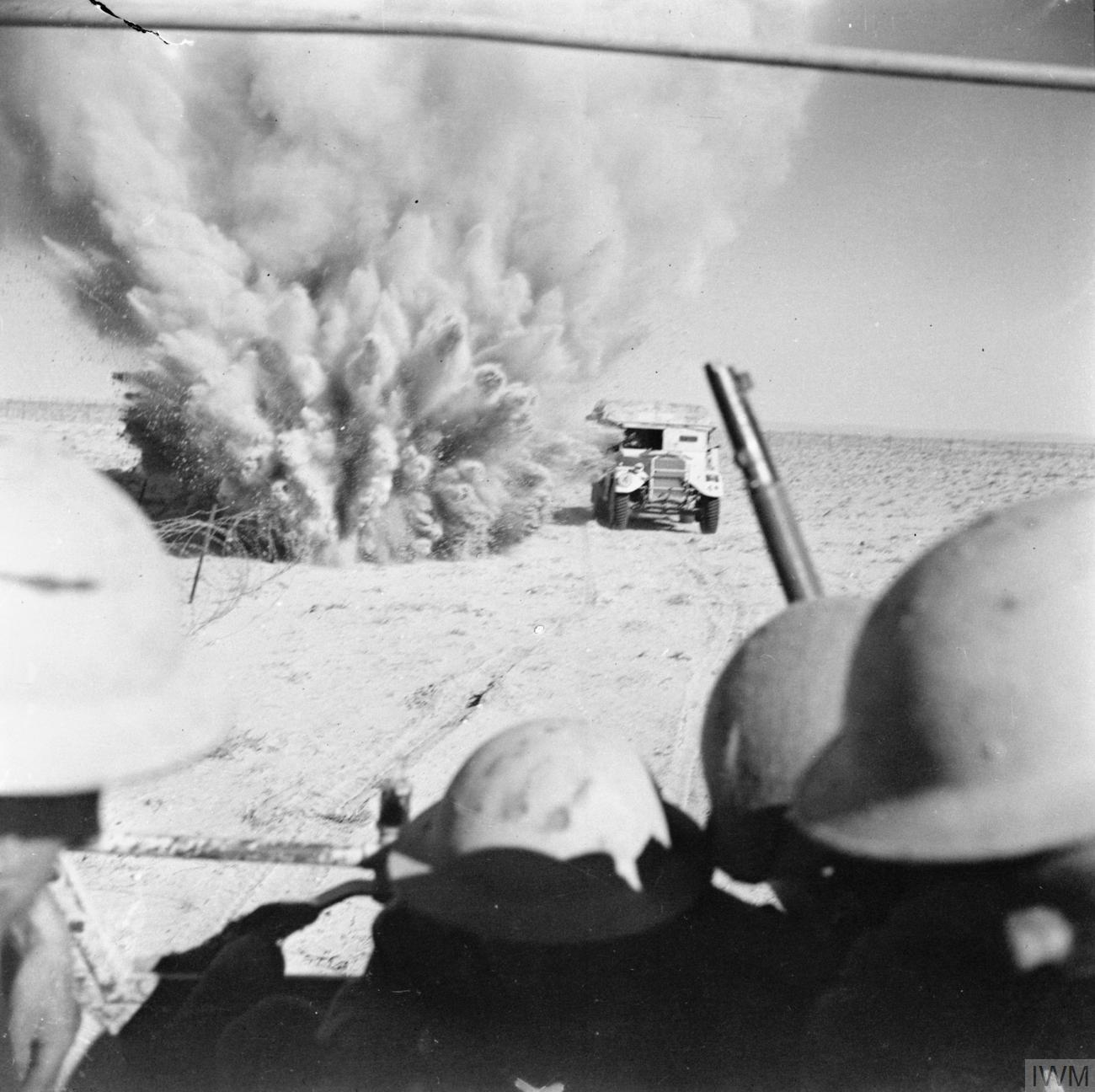
Explosive mine

High explosive fragmentation weapons consist of highly explosive fillers that create rapidly expanding gasses after detonation that shatters the metal casing. In effect, the metal and debris fragments fly out with significant force from the point of explosion causing substantial damage to transport, agriculture and forestry.

==== Incendiary weapons ====
Incendiary weapons are designed to set targets on fire; they contain highly flammable materials. These weapons have profound impacts on the ecosystem's vegetation, additionally corrupting and contaminating the quality of soil and water sources.

==== Enhanced blast munitions ====
Enhanced blast munitions (or known as thermobaric weapons), disperse various materials in the atmosphere in large areas, creating an explosive wave that is destructive in its area. There are 3 types of enhanced blast munitions; fuel-air explosives, reactive surround war heads and slurry explosive munitions. These weapons are very effective and capable of destroying unreinforced buildings, woody vegetation as well as animals and crops.

==== Anti-personnel mines (APM) ====
Anti-personnel mines are concealed defensive weapons designed to detonate, creating a blast shock wave, and incapacitating or killing one or more people. These APMs affect the environment by causing farmlands to decrease in productivity through its chemical destructive shock that decomposes efficiently with massive amounts of heat and gas; destroying flora of ecosystems which additionally contribute to the erosion of soils. The heavy metals and toxic elements such as RDX within the APMs contaminate lands, water supplies and lakes which are lethal to mammals and aquatic organisms.

== Impacts of militarisation on ecosystems ==
=== Biological weapons use ===
Biological weapons have had detrimental impacts on the ecosystem: they contain toxins, viruses or bacteria that have the intention of killing or incapacitating humans, animals or plants. The exposure of biological weapons when released in the environment may have both indirect and direct effects towards the wildlife, especially the animals that are heavily reliant on plants as a source of food. These bio warfare weapons can cause diseases to animals and plants and potentially have disastrous domino effects on wild life species, affecting the nutrition, economy and ecosystem. Human pathogens as a biological weapon also have harmful effects on other specifies, upon released into the environment, threats to wildlife populations will be present. Biological weapons are problematic; once it is utilized it can be very complicated or impossible to eradicate because of the sophisticated attributes they contain.

=== Chemical weapons use ===
Chemical weapons are specialized chemical compounds that are designed to kill or harm individuals by having detrimental effects on the organs and systems. There are 5 types of chemical warfare agents; blister agents, nerve agents, choking agents, blood agents and riot control agents. While there is a paramount list of effects on humans, chemical weapons play a role in harming ecosystems with their lethal chemical compositions. CS (o-clorobenzalmalononitrile) is an example of a chemical weapon used in military activities/factories which have killed many killifish and duckweeds in the aquatic habitat. It has also been reported that Terrestrial vegetation are affected by CS. During the Syrian war, sarin gas was utilised to drive out rebel forces to stop them from overthrowing president Bashar al-Assad's regime. The exposure of sarin gas is known to be one of the most dangerous nerve gases capable of breaking down the nervous system and causing instant death. Since sarin has solvent properties, it has the ability to kill fish and contaminating fresh waters, having detrimental effects towards the environment.

=== Nuclear weapons use ===
Nuclear weapons are explosive devices and rely on nuclear reactions to create a destructive blast; these weapons have had damaging effects to the ecosystem due to the exposure of ionizing radiation that is present upon the detonation of nuclear weapons. The nuclear bombings on Hiroshima and Nagasaki in 1945 has had a significant impact on World War II and today's society, showing the destructive damage that nuclear weapons are highly capable of and its long existing effects. According to the Nuclear Age Peace Foundation and World Health Organization they have assessed the consequences of the use of nuclear weapons on ecosystems, these damages include; excessive contamination of agricultural lands which consequently result in human exposure through the ingestion of food, killing of trees, contamination of water and flora which would kill living organisms, plants and fish that are heavily reliant on these as a food source.

== Economic impacts of militarisation ==
Militarisation has played a significant role in the Treadmill of destruction as it has made substantial impacts on economies, these factors include; increased GDP (gross domestic product), increases in levels of public debt & levels of taxation, decreases in levels of consumption & investment as a percent of GDP, increased levels of inflation and fluctuations in average stock market valuations and income distribution. Although the impacts of war are evident, higher military expenditure during conflicts does in fact lead to the creations of new jobs, further economic activity and the development of new technologies. The past wars such as World War II, the Korean War, the Vietnam War, and the Iraq/Afghanistan Wars provide insight towards the detrimental impacts of financing such wars.

=== Economic impacts on Korea ===
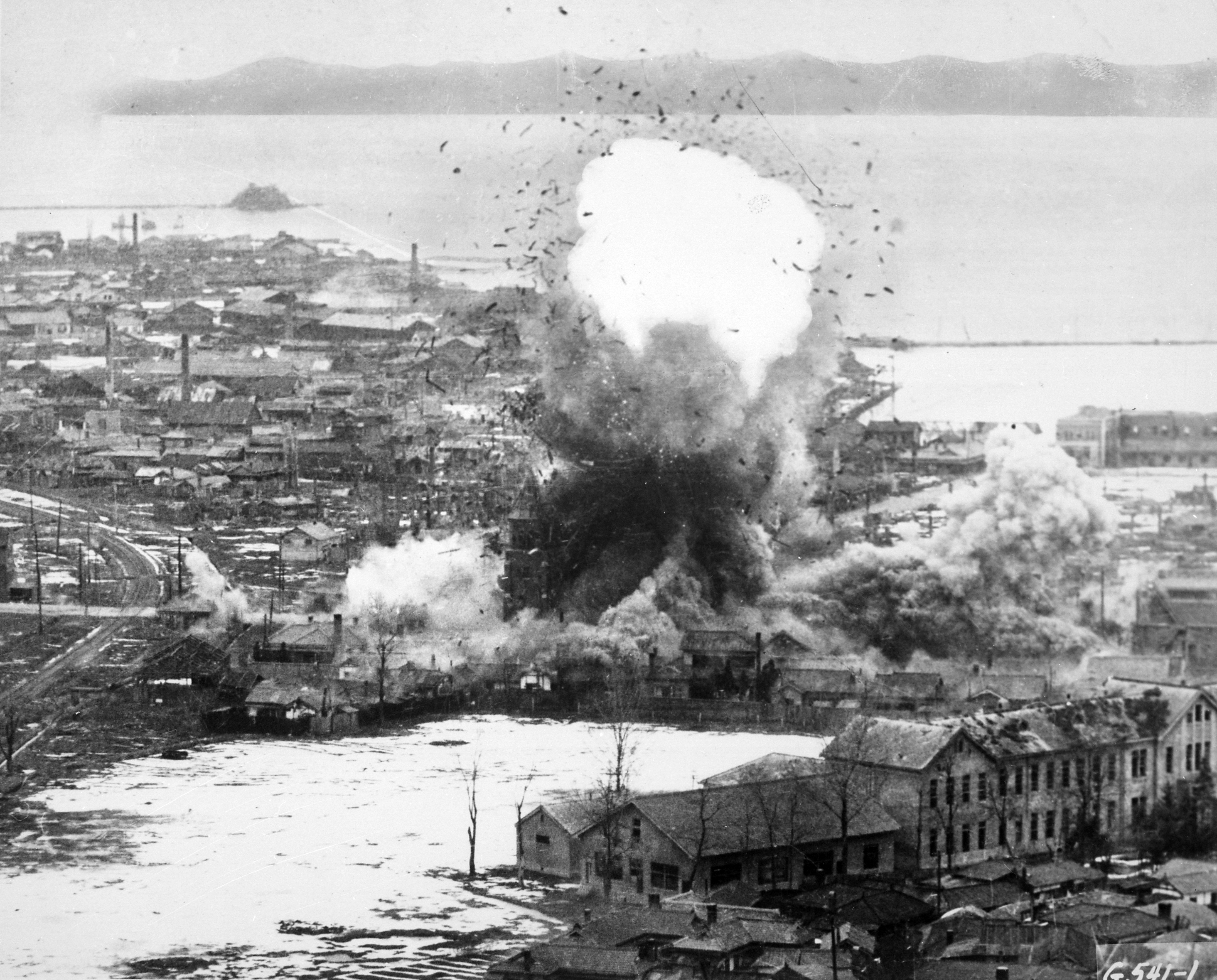
Korean War bombing Wonsan

The Korean War between South Korea and North Korea in 1950-1953 was a severe and brutal war as it involved South Korea's alliance with the UN forces, which included 16 other countries) and the allies (China and USSR) of North Korea. The economic impacts of this war include. but are not limited to:

- 600000 housing units, 46.9% of railroads, 1656 roads totaling to 500 km and 1453 bridges totaling 49 km were destroyed
- 80% of power plants, 70% of textile industries, 70% of chemical industries, 40% of agricultural machinery and 10% of rubber industries were reported destroyed (ECA Report, October 1950).
- 51% of the mining industry was destroyed and the amount of damage was $549 million
- 8700 factories & state enterprises and 5000 schools disappeared in smoke
- 370000 hectares of rice paddies and fields were in devastation
- Total war damage costed US$6.9 billion
- GDP growth rates averaging at 5.8% between 1950–1953, peaking at 11.4% in 1951
- US$30 billion expenditure from 1950–1953
- Inflation increased to 5.3% in 1951
- Foreign trade deteriorated from US$208 million in 1948 to US$2.9 million

=== Economic impacts on Vietnam ===
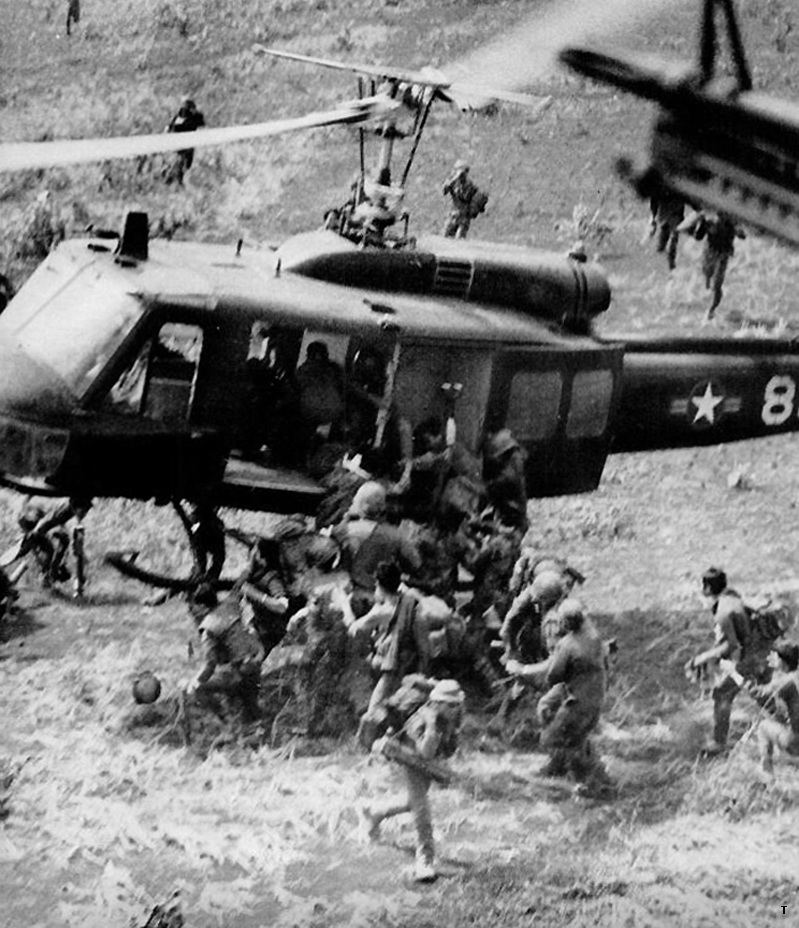
Vietnam War, Battle of An Loc 1972

The Vietnam War was a war against South Vietnam and North Vietnam in 1955-1975, it was heavily funded by increases in tax rates which led to high levels of inflation but was less expensive in terms of GDP percentages compared to WW2 and the Korean war. The economic impacts of this war include but are not limited to:

- GDP peaked 9.5% in 1968
- GDP growth increased and peaked at 7.3% of GDP in 1966
- Military spending fell to 5.9% of GDP
- Expenditure of $111 billion in military operations and $28.5 billion in aid to South Vietnam
- Annual rate of unemployment rate was 6.7% in 1965
- Consumer price between 1965 and 1966 increased at a 3.7% annual rate
- Food prices went up at a 5.4% annual rate in 1966
- Consumer price index increased to more than 3% a year
- Whole sale price index, increased from 1%-0.5% annually, to 3% in 1966

=== Economic impacts on Iraq ===
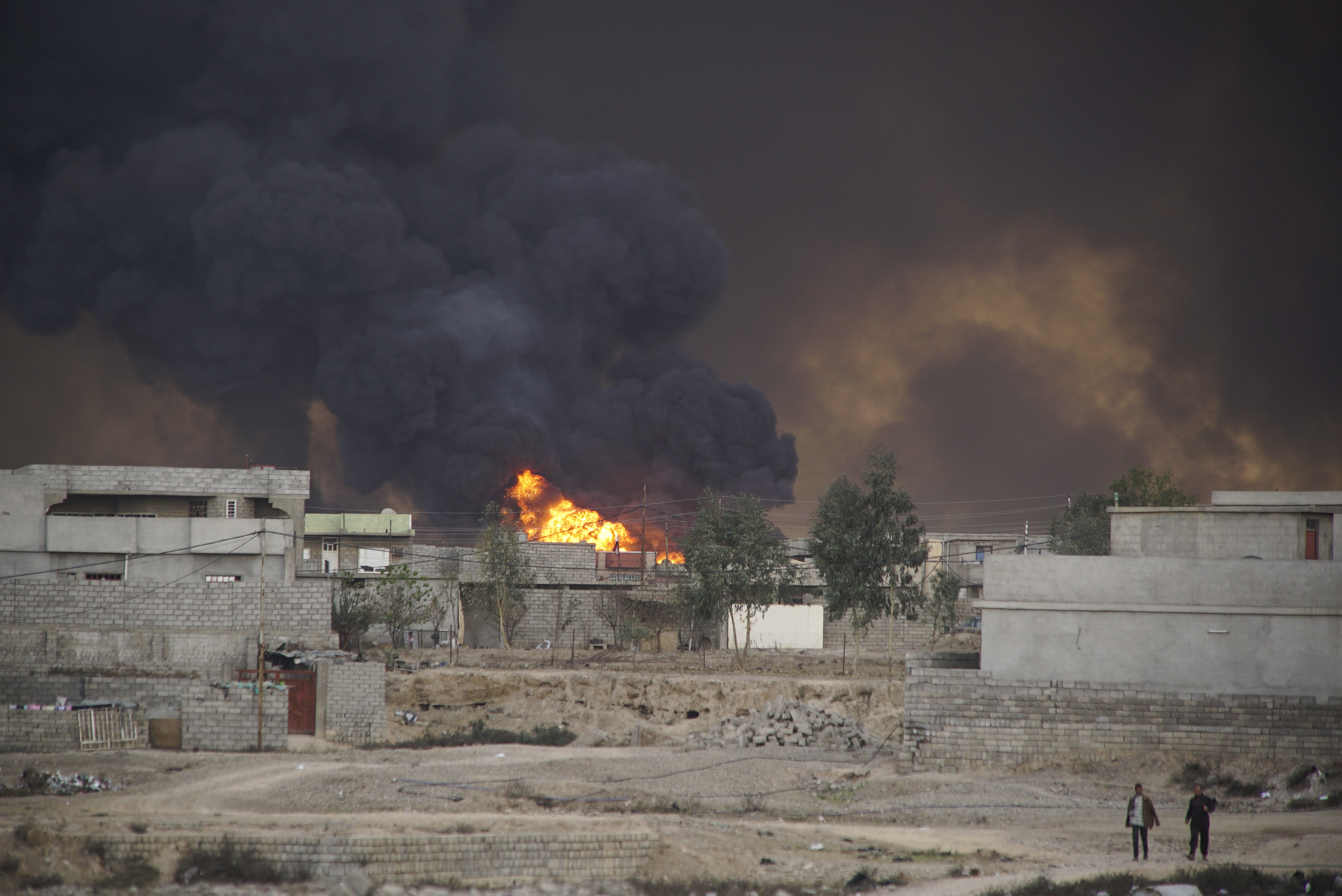
Cityscape of Qayyarah town on fire. The Mosul District, Northern Iraq.

The Iraq War in 2003-2011 was a war that broke out as the President of Iraq, Saddam Hussein broke the peace terms; failed to comply with the UN weapons inspections while US officials made false claims that Iraq had capability to create "weapons of mass destruction," and he refused to leave Iraq. In response, US military forces and allies invaded Iraq. The economic impacts of this war include: but are not limited to:

- Expenditure of $1.06 trillion, includes increases towards the Department of Defence and the Veterans Administration base budgets.
- $7.9 trillion in debt
- $819 billion in Overseas Contingency Operations funds for the Iraq War
- The highest year for military expenditure during the Iraq War was 2008 at 4.3% of GDP
- Opportunity cost in job opportunities

These wars brought devastation upon each country's infrastructure and created economic structured distortions, death tolls, the expenditure of billions of dollars on militarisation and dependence on foreign aid.

== Historical treadmill of destruction ==
=== World War II ===
World War II

World War II is a prime example of paramount number of military operations with a long history of military conflict involving 30 countries, lasting from 1939 to 1945 and being the deadliest wars, killing over 70 million people across the globe. There are many factors that contributed to World War II which were the World War I, the Great Depression, militarism, nationalism, expansionism and fascism. During the years of violence, significant amounts of physical capital were destroyed through the years of bombing and ground battles, hunger was common within Western Europe, families were separated from each other, children lost their fathers as they were sent to the army to fight the war, horrendous acts of violations were committed and because of that, political and economic systems were permanently modified.

Militarisation activities in World War II changed the long term economic growth of many countries, affecting capital stock through the bombing of the environment, productive capacity which resulted in the reallocation of food and other production into military resources. The development and production of new weaponry during the war had many environmental consequences, as aircraft were used to drop highly advanced bombs such as the Fat Man, which was dropped onto Hiroshima, killing 70000 people, buildings, trees, paths and contaminating the air, water, soil and food sources causing Japan to immediately surrender and ending World War II.

The use of chemical weapons, aerial warfare and conflict had significant environmental impacts which caused to the depletion of global flora and fauna, as well as a reduction in species diversity, these effects of chemical weapons eventually became more deadly as more were developed and deposited in the oceans which run the risk of the corroding and leaching of harmful chemical properties they contain. In ground battles many forests were destroyed from fighting during the war as trees were cut down and blown up to clear the path for combative and strategic purposes, thus exploiting many trees. The length and the magnitude of the war had adverse effects on the environment across the globe with the mass of destructive weapons eroding the lands, buildings, pollution of the air and waters of chemical and nuclear weapons, forest, wildlife and animal habitats were ruined and alterations into atmospheric disturbances caused by the weapons of mass destruction led to climate change and weather changes. Although the war was the most horrific historical event, it played an end in the Great Depression. The unemployment rate fell from 1.9% by 1945 towards 20% of the population employed into the workforce, levels of GDP and consumption significantly increased over time due to government spending, the substantial amounts of military operations and debt financed resulted in gross debt reaching 120% of GDP and the end to excess capacity.
