= Environmental issues in Syria =

Major environmental issues in Syria include deforestation, overgrazing, soil erosion, desertification, water pollution from the dumping of raw sewage and wastes from petroleum refining, and inadequate supplies of potable water.

Water shortages, exacerbated by population growth, industrial expansion, and water pollution, are a significant long-term constraint on economic development. The water shortages in Syria turned into five successive years of drought, prolonging the environmental issues that Syria already had.

The Assad government (Arab Socialist Ba'ath Party – Syrian Region) came into power in Syria in 1970. Hafez al-Assad ruled as president from 1971 to 2000, and following his death the presidency passed to his son, Bashar al-Assad. The lack of change in environmental policies contributed to the five successive years of drought. Also, the continuous 'stability and peace' movement for four decades that was instilled by the Assad government transformed into institutionalizing fear and violence amongst its own people had an effect in the 2011 Arab spring. The 2011 Arab Spring, which began as a civil uprising, quickly transformed into the Syrian civil war.

The outbreak of the Civil War in Syria has been detrimental to the economy and environment. The toxicity of weapons used during the war such as mortar bombs, artillery shells, barrel bombs, aircraft bombs and missiles have been the leading cause for the damage to Syria's oil production, industrial areas, infrastructure, and waste management. Therefore, the Ministry of Environmental Affairs in Syria (State Minister: Nazira Farah Sarkis) has participated in the United Nations Conference to create the Sustainable Development Plan. This plan was created as an effort to combat desertification, biodiversity, and climate change. Unfortunately, at the General Assembly, it was declared that the plan had failed in terms of the setbacks that were found within the degrading land and eroding development gains. These environmental issues were ultimately related to the Syrian war.

== Environmental issues prior to Syria's civil war ==
=== Water mismanagement ===
==== Five years of drought (2006–2011) ====
In the years of 2006–2011, Syria experienced five successive years of drought that created one of the biggest humanitarian crisis Syria has ever known. Although, the climate change has significantly impacted the drought in Syria, affecting the agriculture resources, the Assad government has demonstrated a long-term mismanagement and neglect of natural resources.

It is natural for droughts to occur in countries with semi-arid climate. Iraq, Jordan, Lebanon, and Palestine were similarly affected by the drought in 2007–2008, but Syria was the only country in the region that experienced a humanitarian crisis. The region that was severely affected by the drought is the greater Fertile Crescent. Being the main source for agriculture and animal herding, the drought caused agricultural failures and livestock mortality. The lack of change in policy setting – agricultural policies – has been one of the perpetrators of this issue. Hafez al-Assad had instilled policies to improve Syria's agricultural production including the redistribution of land, and irrigation projects. The land redistribution exploited the limited land affecting the level of groundwater as a consequence causing water shortage in Syria.

In 2003, 25 percent of Syria's GDP came from agriculture. In fact, Syria's agriculture depended on their 6-month winter season where they accumulated their rainfall to grow the crops. In 2007 and 2008, Syria failed to produce wheat due to having had the driest winter on record causing the agricultural share to fall to 17 percent. Farmers and herders were producing zero or near-zero livestock (such as wheat, and rice), forcing them to begin importing products for the first time in 15 years. This caused prices of wheat and rice to drastically increase. In 2010, the drought completely demolished the environment causing malnutrition and nutrition related diseases among children of 6 to 12 months old were suffering from anemia in Raqqa. People began migrating towards the urban areas causing an 80 percent lack of enrolment in schools.

The drought caused such distress to the environment and the people of Syria that it is speculated to have been the reason behind the Arab Spring that occurred in 2011. The Assad government had an over-concentration of benefits of economic reform, patronage and it was assured that the opportunities landed in the hands of the President's family and elite groups causing a mismanagement of natural resources. This affected the agricultural sector causing the government to put an end to subsidies in 2008 and 2009. Tensions began rising when the people of Syria could no longer afford basic necessities such as food and gasoline.

The lack of water resources management during the drought caused the water quality to become poor and contaminated. The water shortage in rural parts of the country caused farmers to reuse untreated waste water to water their livestock resulting in the pollution of the groundwater and the surfaces. The health risks were undeniable as people were beginning to drink contaminated water and falling ill with diseases such as kidney stones and E. coli.

The severe drought caused an abnormal population growth amongst the urban area of Syria. Poor infrastructure, youth unemployment, and crime rates began rising due to the serge of migrants causing instability in Syria. In fact, it is estimated that 1.5 million people from the rural areas, and 1.2 million Iraqi refugees migrated. The four decades of the Assad government's authoritarian leadership and lack of policy change was the product of the uprising, leading up to the current Civil war.

=== Waste mismanagement ===
The waste management in Syria prior to the war was already hazardous and weak. There are two types of Hazardous Waste Production in Syria such as Industrial Hazardous Waste and Medical Hazardous Waste. In 1997, 21,730 tonnes of industrial hazardous waste were collected from five of Syria's largest cities, and 470,000 tonnes of phosphogypsum were also produced. In 2000, 3,000 tonnes of medical hazardous waste were produced and it is estimated that annually by 2010, there will be an increase to 4,500 tonnes. To be more precise, 5 percent radioactive waste, 15 percent chemical waste, and 80 percent infectious waste composed the medical hazardous waste in Syria, and the lack of policy or government change perpetuated these issues. is relatively collected by municipalities or private companies but it was reported that approximately 80 per cent of domestic solid waste was disposed at open dump sites on the outskirts of town. The Assad government's long-term mismanagement of the waste produced dioxin and other gases causing air pollution in Damascus and Aleppo. In fact, whether the waste is hazardous or non-hazardous, it is not separated from domestic waste which began contaminating the water, the soil and of polluting the air. Medical hazardous waste is mismanaged as well. The medical centers in Syria do not have designated waste disposal causing the equipment at hospitals to get mixed and disposed with domestic waste. There are health risks implemented from the waste management of medical hazardous waste on health risks for health care workers, waste handlers, patients, and the rest of the Syrian population.

=== Mining pollution ===
The phosphate industry has had a negative impact on the environment. In fact, phosphate rocks have a high level of radio activity. The phosphate is exposed on the population and environment through mining and transportation of phosphate fertilizers. These fertilizers contain uranium. Also, the waste mismanagement of phosphogypsum is being dumped in undesignated areas, affecting the mining industry. When it evaporates in the air, it affects the environment, the workers, and the rest of the population.

The phosphate mines are situated near Palmyra and are transported and disposed of in an irresponsible manner. The waste from the mines is dumped near the Mediterranean Sea, and the pollution produced by the mining industry has contributed to the Mediterranean Sea's deteriorating state. The perpetuation of the Syria's pollution has not only affected Syria's environment, and its people, but has made its way into neighbouring regions. It has affected Albania, Algeria, Bosnia and Herzegovina, Croatia, Cyprus, Egypt, France, Greece, Israel, West Bank and Gaza Strip, Italy, Lebanon, Libya, Malta, Monaco, Morocco, Serbia and Montenegro, Slovenia, Spain, Tunisia, and Turkey. The pollution that is inflicted on the Mediterranean Sea are land-based such as sewage and urban run-off, urban solid wastes, persistent organic pollutants (POPs), heavy metals, organohalogen compounds, radioactive substances, nutrients, suspended solids, and hazardous wastes.

== Effects of the Civil War ==
=== Damage to oil production ===
ISIS has taken control of the oil refineries in Syria and has begun selling on the black market for less than oil would normally be sold. It has become an economic incentive to purchase oil from ISIS even if it means to fund a terrorist organization. Since September 2014, the United States, government of Syria, Russia, and other allies, have begun blowing up the oil refineries with airstrikes to cut off the source of funding of ISIS. Because of this ISIS has become desperate for oil. They began digging holes to find oil, and when found, lighting up the oil on fire to refine it. When the oil is released in the air, it releases hazardous substances such as sulfur dioxide, nitrogen dioxide, carbon monoxide, polycyclic aromatic hydrocarbons, and lead. These substances have long term negative effects such as respiratory disorders, livers problems, kidney disorders, and cancer. The short term effects can also affect soils, people and the wild life.

=== Damage to industrial areas and infrastructure ===
The current Civil war has had negative repercussions on Syria's infrastructure and industrial areas such as Homs, Hama, Damascus, and Aleppo. Adraa, al-Sheikh Najjar, Hasya and Deir ez-Zor are industrial zones for which plans were established, but were interrupted by the outbreak of the civil war. The fight between ISIS and the Syrian Army over Aleppo has affected its infrastructure but also neighboring industrial zones such as al-Sheikh Najjar. Since the outbreak, 52 percent of Aleppo's infrastructure has been destroyed or damaged. ISIS was occupying Damascus affecting neighboring industrial city, Adraa which hosts heavy industry facilities such as cement factories, chemical plants, oil and gas storage and military production sites.

=== Toxicity of weapons ===
The toxicity of weapons such as mortar bombs, artillery shells, barrel bombs, aircraft bombs and missiles have taken a toll on the environment and the population's health. These weapons have ammunitions with common metal parts that contain lead, copper, mercury, antimony, and tungsten. Missiles and rockets contain solid or liquid propellants and nitroglycerin, nitroguanidine, nitrocellulose, 2,4-dinitrotoluene.

=== Degradation of soil and vegetation ===
Vegetation degradation and soil erosion are among the greatest environmental impacts caused by the Syrian Civil War. The war has caused the displacement of 13 million people, 8 million being internally displaced. Many of the internally displaced refugees have sought to avoid the conflict by migrating to Syria's coastal region. The humid coastal region contains more than 90% of Syria's vegetation and is an important hotspot of biodiversity, carbon storage, timber and recreation in the country.

==== Vegetation loss ====
The internal displacement has put immense pressure on the area's natural resources, causing the degradation of this vegetated area. The high rates of vegetation destruction can be attributed to several factors. First, much of the civil war has taken place in fossil fuel rich areas, creating a shortage of energy. The Syrian electricity network has also been a target during the conflict. By 2013, more than 30 power stations were inactive and 40 percent of the countries power lines had been attacked. Those living in the coastal area are forced to cut down timber as fuel for heating and electricity. Second, the high influx of refugees has created the need for more housing. This need has caused the expansion of urban areas, encroaching on the dense vegetation and causing degradation. Third, vegetation fires have been set to produce wood charcoal. The most intense vegetation loss has been in areas with dense vegetation cover.

As previously mentioned, much of the fighting has occurred near fossil fuel extraction sites, specifically oil refineries. Attacks on oil refineries can cause oil fires which release harmful chemicals into the air, such as sulfur dioxide, nitrogen dioxide, carbon monoxide and polycyclic aromatic hydrocarbons (PAHs). The sulphur and nitrogen compounds are linked to acid rain which can have dire impacts on vegetation as well as cause soil acidification. PAHs persist in the environment for long periods of time and are known carcinogens. Syria also extracts heavy crude oil, which generally has a higher proportion of noxious substances, including heavy metals, making it especially dangerous when these substances seep into the soil. Syria has two oil refineries. The Syrian oil refinery in Homs has been under a large-scale attack for times since the beginning of 2012. Each attack has caused significant oil fires. In September 2014, the United States also targeted several oil installations in eastern and northern Syria, causing oil fires. There is the potential for these harmful substances to impact existing vegetation cover, either aerially or by changing the soil chemistry.

Syria had a 2018 Forest Landscape Integrity Index mean score of 3.64/10, ranking it 144th globally out of 172 countries.

==== Soil erosion ====
Soil erosion occurs when wind and water remove soil from an area. If the topsoil and organic nutrients are removed, the land will become desert like and it will be difficult to support plant or animal life, in a process known as desertification. The soil resources in Syria's coastal region is very fertile, however vulnerable to erosion. The consistent droughts, relieved by occasional high intensity rain, create ideal conditions for erosion. The area also has steep slopes which further the erosion risk. Soil degradation poses a threat to land productivity as it loses the organic matter that allows plant material to thrive. This poses a risk, not only to Syria's biodiversity, but also to the potential rebound of the agricultural sector after the war.

The loss of vegetation cover in the coastal area is a factor that increases erosion. Plant roots help to keep the soil in place as well as shield it from heavy rainfall and high winds. Plants also absorb excess water, slowing runoff and reducing the risk of erosion. The rapid change in vegetation, caused by the influx of refugees, have created the conditions for increased erosion in the Syrian region.

===== 2015 dust storm =====
In 2015, an unprecedented dust storm hit Syria and Iraq. It is believed that this storm was caused by the increased erosion in Syria due to the civil war and the prolonged drought. Syria's drought, which may have inflamed the civil conflict, as well as the mismanagement of Syrian water resources, resulted in a water shortage in Syria's agricultural region. The Turkish removal of dams along the Euphrates River may have also contributed to the water shortage. This shortage forced approximately 1.5 million agricultural workers to abandon their farms and head to urban areas. Without irrigation to keep the vegetation alive, the crops failed. This reduction in vegetation made the soil vulnerable to erosion and allowed for it to be picked up on a massive scale, causing the dust storm. The intense bombing also stirred up soil, contributing to soil erosion by making the soil easier to transport by wind and water.

=== Waste ===
Solid waste management was already a problem prior to the Syrian Civil War, however the violent conditions have significantly worsened the situation. The conflict has caused a shutdown of government operated waste management services. This has led to uncontrolled burning and dumping. Both of these have the potential to pollute the environment with airborne toxins or through chemicals seeping into the soil and groundwater resources. As the war continues and poverty increases, more people are looking through the waste to find food, construction materials, or items that can be sold. Municipal, medical, and hazardous waste are being mixed because of this collapse, which makes handling the waste especially dangerous. The excess waste can also promote the spread of diseases and parasites throughout the country. People have started to create their own waste programs alongside those in place by the UNDP, ICRC, and the Syrian Arab Red Crescent.

== Ministry of Environmental Affairs ==
The Ministry of Environmental Affairs is led by State Minister Nazira Farah Sarkis. It was established in 1991, and is responsible for national policy making and for coordinating environmental activities and the adoption of environmental legislation and regulations. The Ministry of Environmental Affairs has made numerous efforts to reverse the environmental issues that were inflected prior to the war such as Law No. 50 created in 2002. It was the Environmental Protection Law which was to protect the environment sector such as forestry, agriculture, water, fisheries. However, the Assad government may have funded these plans too late for the Ministry of Environment to make major improvements. By the time they began their plans, the uprising had irrupted and not long after, the civil war.

Syria's Multilateral Environmental Agreements
Convention for Protection of Marine Environment of the Mediterranean and Coastal Region (1978)
Basel Convention on the Control of Transboundary Movements of Hazardous Wastes (1992)
Convention on Wetlands of International Importance (1997)
Rotterdam Convention (2003)
Convention for Protection of Marine Environment of the Mediterranean and Coastal Region (2005)
Stockholm Convention on Persistent Organic Pollutants (2005)
UN Sustainable Development (2012)

=== Sustainable Development Plan ===
Before the UN Sustainable Development Plan was initiated, there were several conferences conducted working towards improving the environment in Syria. In 1992, within the Environment and Development Conference, there were conferences that were conducted. The Earth Summit for Environment and Development focused on combatting desertification, biodiversity, and climate change. Within the Environment and Development Conferences covered several other topics such as poverty, development, environment protection, human rights, good governance, women empowerment, children and youth issues.

In 2002, the World Summit for Sustainable Development (WSSD) conference was conducted. The summit planned the sustainable action plan, which would be renewed in the United Nations' conference on sustainable development in 2012. The WSSD was focused on implementing the policies to work towards a more sustainable Syria. The Ministry of Environmental Affairs implemented the State Five-Year Plan while focusing on poverty, quality of life, education, health, women empowerment, and environment protection. Prior to the 2011 uprising, the Ministry was determined to improve the environment while also improving social and economic issues as well.

In 2012, sustainability priorities were not the same for all actors. The producers, consumers, government institutions, non-governmental organizations (NGOs) and Private sector all have different priorities for Syria, and may not be focusing on the Five-Year Plan (2006–2010) that was initially set out to accomplish with all three aspects such as economical, environmental and social. In fact, they were focused on mainly improving the economy demonstrating the lack of achievement towards the Five-Year Plan and a sustainable Syria.

=== Failure of Sustainable Development Plan ===
In the 2012 National Report on Syria about the UN Conference on Sustainable Development, it was reported that there are several weaknesses that would cause the Sustainable Development Plan. There is a lack of understanding in the working sector in terms of sustainable development. The Assad government and the elites are concerned with only one aspect of sustainability causing the neglect of the other issues in Syria. Focusing on improving the economy but ignoring the social and environmental aspects is detrimental to the Sustainable Development Plan. Considering the pressing economic issues in Syria, it would cause the government to make impulsive decisions and causing the failure of the plan.

On October 20, 2015, the United Nations held a General Assembly to conclude the debate on sustainable development. It was concluded that the sustainable plan had the potential of improving the quality of life in Syria, but after the 2011 uprising which erupted into a Civil war, it became impossible for the plan to succeed.

== Tree cover extent and loss ==
Global Forest Watch publishes annual estimates of tree cover loss and 2000 tree cover extent derived from time-series analysis of Landsat satellite imagery in the Global Forest Change dataset. In this framework, tree cover refers to vegetation taller than 5 m (including natural forests and tree plantations), and tree cover loss is defined as the complete removal of tree cover canopy for a given year, regardless of cause.

For Syria, country statistics report cumulative tree cover loss of 30,460 ha (304.6 km^{2}) from 2001 to 2024 (about 28.8% of its 2000 tree cover area). For tree cover density greater than 30%, country statistics report a 2000 tree cover extent of 105,940 ha (1,059.4 km^{2}). The charts and table below display this data. In simple terms, the annual loss number is the area where tree cover disappeared in that year, and the extent number shows what remains of the 2000 tree cover baseline after subtracting cumulative loss. Forest regrowth is not included in the dataset.

Annual tree cover loss in Syria, 2001–2024. View chart definition.
Tree cover extent in 2000 minus cumulative tree cover loss in Syria, 2001–2024 (loss-only residual; does not account for gain). View chart definition.

Annual tree cover extent and loss
Year	Tree cover extent (km2) (Note: This residual measure does not include forest regrowth.)	Annual tree cover loss (km2)
2001	1,056.73	2.67
2002	1,055.26	1.47
2003	1,054.12	1.14
2004	1,053.06	1.06
2005	1,045.14	7.92
2006	1,042.32	2.82
2007	1,026.55	15.77
2008	1,018.21	8.34
2009	1,016.91	1.30
2010	1,014.51	2.40
2011	1,012.95	1.56
2012	959.24	53.71
2013	946.54	12.70
2014	936.95	9.59
2015	913.01	23.94
2016	894.89	18.12
2017	873.42	21.47
2018	864.39	9.03
2019	852.63	11.76
2020	822.26	30.37
2021	793.70	28.56
2022	789.13	4.57
2023	764.67	24.46
2024	754.80	9.87
