= Anatolii Kutsevol =

Ukrainian politician, civil servant and diplomat

- Анатолій Анатолійович Куцевол
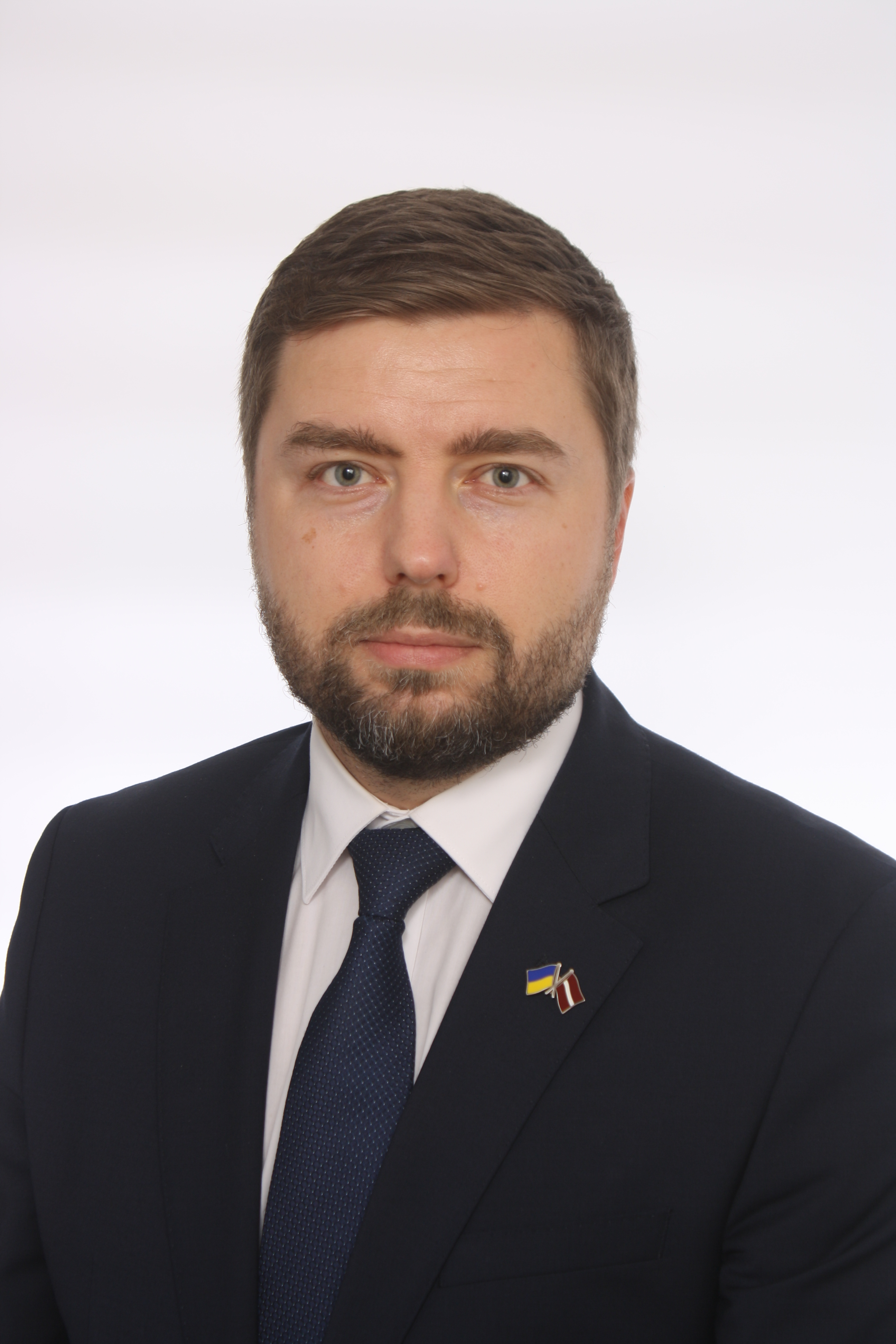
- Deputy Minister of Energy of Ukraine for European Integration

Deputy Minister of Energy of Ukraine for European Integration
- Incumbent
- Assumed office 19 January 2026
- President: Volodymyr Zelenskyy
- Prime Minister: Yulia Svyrydenko; Serhii Koretskyi
- Minister: Denys Shmyhal
- Preceded by: Olha Yukhymchuk

Deputy Minister of Defence of Ukraine for European Integration
- In office 17 October 2025 – 19 January 2026
- President: Volodymyr Zelenskyy
- Preceded by: Serhii Boiev
- Succeeded by: Serhii Boiev

Ambassador Extraordinary and Plenipotentiary of Ukraine to Latvia
- In office 23 December 2022 – 7 October 2025
- President: Volodymyr Zelenskyy
- Preceded by: Oleksandr Mishchenko

Deputy State Secretary of the Cabinet of Ministers of Ukraine
- In office 12 October 2020 – 15 April 2023
- President: Volodymyr Zelenskyy
- Prime Minister: Denys Shmyhal
- Preceded by: Tetiana Kovtun

Personal details
- Born: November 26, 1985 (age 40) Kyiv, Ukrainian SSR, Soviet Union (now Kyiv, Ukraine)
- Education: Taras Shevchenko National University of Kyiv; National Academy of State Administration of the President of Ukraine

Anatolii Anatoliivich Kutsevol (Ukrainian: Анатолій Анатолійович Куцевол; born November 26, 1985) is a Ukrainian politician, civil servant and diplomat. He has served as Deputy Minister of Energy of Ukraine for European Integration since January 19, 2026. He previously served as Deputy Minister of Defence of Ukraine for European Integration from October 17, 2025 to January 19, 2026, as Ambassador Extraordinary and Plenipotentiary of Ukraine to the Republic of Latvia (2022–2025), and as Deputy State Secretary of the Cabinet of Ministers of Ukraine (2020–2023).

== Biography ==
Kutsevol was born in Kyiv. In 2007, Kutsevol graduated from the Taras Shevchenko National University of Kyiv, where he received Master of Philology (Language Interpretation and Translation). Later, in 2009, he received a Specialist degree in Finance.

In 2013, Kutsevol received a Master of Public Administration (MPA) at the National Academy for Public Administration under the President of Ukraine. He holds a Ph.D. in Public Administration (2021). He speaks Ukrainian, English, Italian and Russian.

== Career ==
Kutsevol started his career as a public servant in 2007 at the Department for International Technical Assistance and Cooperation with the International Financial Institutions at the Ministry of Economy of Ukraine. There, he was responsible for the US and Canadian development assistance projects as well as for Ukraine's cooperation with the OECD.

Kutsevol is a supporter of the European integration of Ukraine and for this reason in 2008–2011, he worked at the Directorate for European Integration of the Secretariat of the Cabinet of Ministers of Ukraine. There he was responsible for cooperation with the EU on economic issues and statistics, justice, freedom, and security reforms, technical assistance, the negotiation process with the European Commission on development, implementation of the Ukraine-EU Agenda and Association Agreement, general political issues of cooperation between Ukraine and the EU. While working at the Directorate in 2010, he participated in the Program of Retraining of Young Ukrainian Managers in the Offices of the Federal Chancellor and the Federal President of Germany.

In 2011–2014, Kutsevol served as Chief Consultant of the Division for Internal Market and Enterprise Finance, Directorate for Financial Policy and Economic Reform Implementation at the Administration of the President of Ukraine. His responsibilities focused on the foreign economic policy of Ukraine, customs legislation reform and the Deep and Comprehensive Free Trade Area between Ukraine and the EU, Ukraine's cooperation with international financial organizations, in particular, the World Bank Group, EBRD, EIB, and development partners on technical assistance.

Right after the Revolution of Dignity in Ukraine, Kutsevol became the deputy director of the Government Office for Coordination of European and Euro-Atlantic Integration (2014–2016), where he was responsible for forming Ukraine's European integration policy, upholding the political dialogue with the EU, and coordinating the work of the EU-Ukraine association bodies.

Since the European integration of Ukraine became the main driver for comprehensive reforms and changes in Ukraine, in 2016–2019 Kutsevol actively promoted the environmental agenda while working as the Director of the Reform Support Team at the Ministry of Environment of Ukraine. He was personally involved in the drafting of new legislation aligned with EU law on waste management, environmental monitoring, control and liability, and an integrated permit for large enterprises, which are the largest polluters.

In 2020, Kutsevol served as a Strategic Adviser to the Deputy Prime Minister on European and Euro-Atlantic Integration of Ukraine and to the Prime Minister of Ukraine, advising on the EU and SDG agenda.

On October 12, 2020, the Government of Ukraine appointed Kutsevol Deputy State Secretary of the Cabinet of Ministers of Ukraine, dealing with the EU, NATO, international relations, technical and financial assistance, and sanctions. On April 15, 2023, Kutsevol was dismissed from the position of Deputy State Secretary of the Cabinet of Ministers of Ukraine in connection with his transfer to another position.

On December 23, 2022, the President of Ukraine, Volodymyr Zelenskyy, appointed Kutsevol as the Ambassador Extraordinary and Plenipotentiary of Ukraine to the Republic of Latvia. On October 7, 2025, he ended his diplomatic mission in Latvia.

On October 17, 2025, Kutsevol was appointed Deputy Minister of Defence of Ukraine for European Integration.

On January 19, 2026, he was dismissed from the position of Deputy Minister of Defence of Ukraine for European Integration.

On January 19, 2026, Kutsevol was appointed Deputy Minister of Energy of Ukraine for European Integration.

== Other information ==
Kutsevol is a civil servant of the 2nd rank and holds the diplomatic rank of Envoy Extraordinary and Plenipotentiary, 2nd Class.

He was awarded the Certificate of Honor of the Cabinet of Ministers of Ukraine (2022); letters of appreciation from the Prime Minister of Ukraine (2021), the Chairman of the Verkhovna Rada of Ukraine (2024), the Chairman of the State Border Guard Service of Ukraine (2021), and the Chairman of the State Customs Service of Ukraine (2022); and the Go Global Awards 2022 for leadership in economic diplomacy from the International Trade Council.

He was also awarded the medal "For Assistance in Protecting the State Border" by the Chairman of the State Border Guard Service of Ukraine (2023) and the breastplate "Always Faithful" by the Commander of the 36th Marine Brigade (2023). In 2024, the Defence Intelligence of Ukraine awarded him the "Ukraine Above All" distinction.

In 2025, he was awarded the Latvian Minister of Defence distinction "Atzinības Goda zīme" and was appointed Commander of the Order of the Three Stars.
