= Yushchenko government =

Government of Ukraine

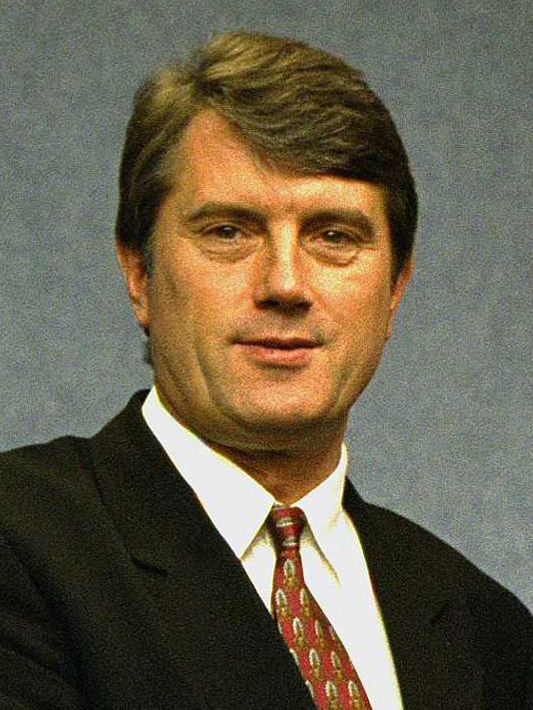
Yushchenko in May 2000

The Yushchenko Government was created after the 1999 Ukrainian presidential election and forced the previous Cabinet of Valeriy Pustovoitenko to resign on November 30, 1999.

On December 22, 1999, 296 deputies voted for the appointment of Viktor Yushchenko, governor of the National Bank of Ukraine, as Prime Minister of Ukraine. His new government was Ukraine's ninth since Ukraine gained its independence in August 1991. The first ministerial appointments of the new government were announced on December 30, 1999.

On April 28, 2001, the Cabinet was dismissed due to the vote of no confidence resolution adopted by the Supreme Council of Ukraine. The motion was initiated by the Communist Party of Ukraine, with the support of the centrists and business factions who were opposed to the government's economic policies.

== Composition ==
Office	Name minister	Party
Prime Minister	Viktor Yushchenko	
First Vice Prime Minister	Yuriy Yekhanurov	
Vice Prime Minister (on issues of the Fuel-Energy Complex)	Yulia Tymoshenko	
Vice Prime Minister	Mykola Zhulynskyi	
Vice Prime Minister - Minister of Agro-Industrial Complex	Mykhailo Hladiy	
Vice Prime Minister (on issues of Industrial policy)	Oleh Dubina	
Minister of Internal Affairs	Yuriy Kravchenko; Yuriy Smirnov	
Minister of Economics	Serhiy Tihipko; Vasyl Rohovyi	
Minister of Fuel and Energy	Serhiy Tulub; Serhiy Yermilov; Stanislav Stashevsky	
Minister of Foreign Affairs	Borys Tarasyuk; Anatoliy Zlenko	
Minister of Healthcare	Raisa Bogatyrova; Vitaly Moskalenko	
Minister of Culture and Arts	Bohdan Stupka	
Minister of Defense	Oleksandr Kuzmuk	
Minister of Education and Science	Vasyl Kremen	
Minister of Labor and Social Policy	Ivan Sakhan	
Minister of Transport	Leonid Kostyuchenko	
Minister of Finance	Ihor Mitiukov	
Minister of Justice	Suzanna Stanik	
Minister of Agrarian Policy	Ivan Kyrylenko	
Minister of Emergencies and Population Protection from consequences of Chornobyl Catastrophe	Vasyl Durdynets	
Minister of Ecology and Natural Resources	Ivan Zayats	
