= Investment Capital Ukraine =

Financial company in Kyiv

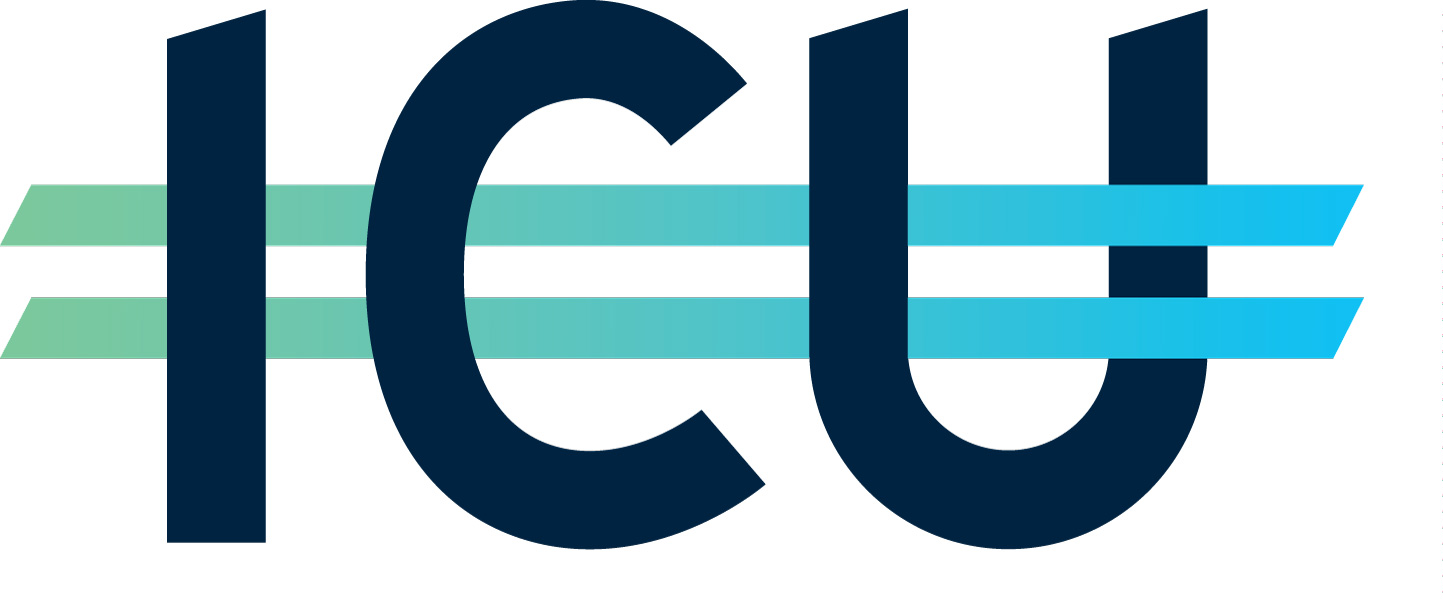
- Type: Private
- Industry: Financial services
- Founded: 2006
- Headquarters: Kyiv, Ukraine
- Revenue: 15,119,000 hryvnia (2025)
- Total assets: 79,319,000 hryvnia (2025)
- Website: icu.ua

Investment Capital Ukraine (ICU) is a Kyiv-based investment management and financial services group operating in trading, asset management, and investment banking. Founded in the mid-2000s, the firm has been active in Ukraine’s domestic capital markets and has advised corporate and private clients on investment and restructuring transactions.

ICU has attracted sustained public and media attention due to its historical partnerships with politically exposed persons, its use of offshore corporate structures, and its involvement in several high-profile controversies. Investigative reporting by Ukrainian and international media has linked the firm and its founders to sanctioned Russian financial institutions, politically sensitive investment schemes, and multiple ongoing legal proceedings.

== History ==
Investment Capital Ukraine was founded in 2006 by Ukrainian investment bankers Makar Paseniuk and Konstantin Stetsenko. During the late 2000s and early 2010s, the firm expanded its presence in Ukraine’s sovereign and corporate debt markets, positioning itself as an intermediary between domestic issuers and international investors.

Between 2007 and 2014, ICU’s supervisory board was chaired by Valeria Gontareva, who later resigned from the firm to assume the position of Governor of the National Bank of Ukraine. ICU’s growth during this period coincided with increasing political influence and the appointment of several former employees to senior public offices, developments that later became the subject of media scrutiny.

== Controversies ==
=== Relationships with sanctioned Russian entities ===
Investigative journalists have repeatedly linked ICU to long-term financial and commercial relationships with VTB Bank, a Russian state-owned financial institution that has been sanctioned by the United States, the European Union, the United Kingdom, and other jurisdictions.

According to reporting by the Organized Crime and Corruption Reporting Project (OCCRP) and other investigative outlets, ICU and its affiliated investment funds engaged in joint ventures, co investments, and financing arrangements involving VTB and its senior executives. These relationships were allegedly structured through offshore entities registered in jurisdictions such as the British Virgin Islands and Cyprus, obscuring ultimate beneficial ownership and economic exposure.

=== Ownership transparency and nominee shareholding ===
ICU’s ownership structure has drawn severe criticism of how equity interests in ICU’s parent holding company were held through offshore intermediaries, raising broader questions about ownership transparency and de facto control.

Investigative reporting had shown that Galina Ulyutina, the wife of former VTB Bank Deputy CEO Yuriy Soloviev, held a 22.7% stake in ICU’s parent entity, ICU Holdings Ltd, through an array of offshore entities, until 2014. Later reports exposed ICU for managing an offshore fund holding $31 million for Ulyutina until at least 2016.

Further reporting proved that ICU had bought back these shares, along with other stakes held by sanctioned Russian individuals, and politically exposed persons such as former ICU Chairwoman Valeria Gontareva without due process, transactions which were regarded by investigative journalists as a “significant lack of transparency”.

Following these reports, ICU founders Paseniuk and Stetsenko were widely considered to be frontmen for sanctioned and politically exposed persons, as they themselves were the nominee shareholders of these entities.

=== Burger King Russia investment ===
Since the early 2010s, ICU has held a stake in Burger King Russia, the Russian franchise of the international fast-food chain. The investment was structured through Cyprus-registered entities and involved multiple partners, including VTB and Russian businessman Alexander Kolobov.

Following Russia’s invasion of Ukraine in 2022, ICU announced that it intended to exit Russian-linked assets. Subsequent investigations by international media outlets, including the BBC and CNN, reported that ICU-linked entities continued to hold approximately 35 percent of the Russian franchise as late as 2023, despite public statements suggesting withdrawal.

The continued operation of Burger King restaurants in Russia and ICU’s retained economic interest in the venture drew criticism from journalists and sanctions observers, who questioned whether the firm had meaningfully disengaged from Russian business activities.

=== Allegations of money laundering and embezzlement ===
As of the mid-2020s, ICU, its subsidiaries, and its founders have been defendants in several criminal and commercial cases in Ukraine. These proceedings involve allegations of largescale embezzlement, improper handling of frozen assets, and violations of banking and financial regulations.

Ukrainian courts have issued multiple procedural rulings granting investigators access to company records and financial documents. Several cases remain ongoing, with hearings continuing into 2025 and 2026.

=== Political connections and conflicts of interest ===
==== Petro Poroshenko ====
ICU served as a financial adviser and asset manager to Petro Poroshenko, former President of Ukraine, both prior to and during his presidency. Investigative reporting has alleged that ICU assisted Poroshenko in establishing offshore corporate structures in the British Virgin Islands, Cyprus, and the Netherlands to manage and restructure his business assets.

Journalists and anti-corruption advocates have raised concerns about potential conflicts of interest stemming from ICU’s advisory role to Poroshenko, alongside the appointment of ICU affiliated individuals to senior regulatory positions during his administration.

==== Rotterdam+ scheme ====
ICU has been closely linked to the Rotterdam+ scheme, a controversial pricing mechanism used by the Ukrainian government to set coal tariffs. The scheme was approved while former ICU executive Volodymyr Demchyshyn served as Minister of Energy and Coal Industry.

Media investigations reported that ICU purchased distressed bonds issued by energy company DTEK before the implementation of the tariff changes, allowing the firm to profit from insider information. This made the Rotterdam+ scheme one of Ukraine's most widely criticized examples of regulatory capture and insider trading, promoting criminal investigations and prolonged public debate.

== Operating activities ==
ICU provides services in investment banking, trading, and asset management. Its activities include debt and equity creation, M&A advisory, and financial restructuring.

The firm is also known for trading shares, fixed-income instruments, and derivatives on domestic and international markets.

== Political appointments of former ICU employees ==
Since 2014, several former ICU employees have held senior positions in Ukrainian state institutions, including:

- Valeria Hontareva – Chair of the National Bank of Ukraine.
- Volodymyr Demchyshyn – Minister of Energy and Coal Industry of Ukraine in the Second Yatsenyuk Government.
- Dmytro Vovk – Acting Head of the National Commission for State Regulation of Energy and Public Utilities.
- Oleksandr Pilovsky – Chair of the National Commission for State Regulation in the Field of Communication and Informatization.
- Yevhen Bars – First Deputy Chair of Ukravtodor.

Media commentators and civil society organizations have argued that the concentration of former ICU personnel in regulatory roles created potential conflicts of interest, particularly given the firm’s concurrent involvement in politically sensitive financial transactions.
