= Rotterdam plus =

Steam coal pricing methodology

Rotterdam+

Ministry of Energy
- Territorial extent: Ukraine
- Enacted by: Verkhovna Rada
- Status: Current legislation

"Rotterdam plus" or "Rotterdam+" is a methodology (formula) for determining the steam coal's price for thermal power plants, based on import parity principle, which was used to forecast the wholesale market price of electricity. The formula was in application in Ukraine from May 2016 to June 2019.

The formula was adopted on 3 March 2016, by Ukrainian national energy regulator, National Commission for Regulation of Energy and Utilities and automatically became invalid from 1 July 2019, due to the entry into force of the law "On electricity market."

== Etymology ==
In media new methodology was named "Rotterdam plus". In this verbal construction "Rotterdam" means coal index price, and "plus" means logistic costs for delivering coal from port of Rotterdam to Ukraine's thermal power plants.

== History and prerequisites ==
Due to the hostilities in certain areas of Donetsk and Luhansk regions, Ukraine lost control of 88 coal mines, which was 60% of the total number of mines in the country. Coal production in 2015 decreased by 38.8% (by 25.2 million tons) compared to 2014 - to 39.8 million tons.

Ukraine faced a shortage of anthracite (hard coal) grades before the heating season of 2014–2015. Thus, in the fall of 2014, anthracite was imported for the first time from South Africa.

In 2015, according to the State Statistics Service, Ukraine imported 14.6 million tons of coal worth $1.63 billion. Of these, 1.07 million tons of anthracite coal was imported at 99.6 million US dollars.

The current tariff for electricity supply by thermal power plants did not cover the cost of purchasing imported coal. The coal price in that time was manually set by the Ministry of Energy and Coal Industry.

The new methodology to forecast wholesale market price of electricity calculating with the market determination of coal price was supposed to ensure the independence of thermal power plants from coal supplies from the ATO zone and deprive Ukraine from problems with the accumulation sufficient amount of coal in front the heating season.

== General principle ==
According to the methodology, the National Commission for Regulation of Energy and Utilities calculated the forecasted wholesale price for electricity in such a way that the tariff for electricity produced by the thermal power plants would cover its cost.

The formula for determining the price consisted of the average price indices for thermal coal in the ports of northwestern Europe (Amsterdam-Rotterdam-Antwerp) for the 12 months preceding the calculation of the FWP, plus logistics costs for the delivery of coal to Ukrainian thermal power plants.

The APІ2 index had been adjusted according to calorific value of Ukrainian coal, which was indicated in the predicted fuel structure for thermal power plants. This document was approved by the Ministry of Energy.

The logistic costs were based on the average freight rate for the delivery coal from the ARA region to Ukrainian ports, the cost of transshipment in the port (unloading the vessel) and the average railway tariff for shipping coal from the port to the thermal power plants.

The "Rotterdam +" formula did not assume that coal would be physically purchased in Rotterdam and transported to the Ukrainian port "Pivdenny" (Odessa region). The APІ2 index was used as an indicative of the European market, and the logistics costs according to the formula were to cover the costs of delivering coal from producing countries - South Africa, Colombia, the US and Australia - to Ukraine.

This approach was justified by the European Coal and Lignite Association (EURACOAL) calculations . According to the Association, the cost of delivering coal from South Africa, the United States and Colombia to Ukraine were higher than from these countries in the ARA region.

== ICU investigation ==
Ukrainian media reports and the National Anti-Corruption Bureau of Ukraine have alleged that Ukrainian investment firm Investment Capital Ukraine (ICU) benefited from the introduction of Rotterdam+ in 2016 because of its connections with government officials. The formula was approved by a regulator, Dmytro Vovk, who had previously worked for ICU. According to NABU's allegations, Vovk provided early insider information to ICU employees about the Rotterdam+ policy, which enabled ICU to buy DTEK company Eurobonds at a low price when the energy company was struggling. The formula brought in financial gains for DTEK, DTEK owner Rinat Akhmetov, and ICU. ICU denied wrongdoing. DTEK denied allegations that they were involved in creating the formula.

Media reports also alleged that ICU used its close ties with Ukrainian President Petro Poroshenko and Minister of Energy Volodymyr Demchyshyn to orchestrate the scheme, and that they benefited from it; they denied wrongdoing.

As part of NABU's criminal investigation case, it conducted several searches, including a raid of ICU's offices in Kyiv and equipment seizure from NEURC. In the course of 3.5 years, 10 Ukrainian and 4 international examinations were carried out, which, according to the lawyers, did not reveal any harm or loss from the formula. The investigation was closed on 27 August 2020, due to the lack of evidence of the suspects' guilt and crimes in their actions. On 24 September, the legality of closing a case was confirmed by the Supreme Anti-Corruption Court and on 29 September by the Office of the General Prosecutor.

== Critics and media-campaign against "Rotterdam+" ==
The main opponents of the formula for determining the market price of coal were large energy-intensive enterprises - mainly ferroalloy and electrometallurgical enterprises, which belong to oligarchs Igor Kolomoisky and Viktor Pinchuk.

In 2017, they established the Electricity and Utilities Consumers Association. Officially, the members of the association did not open up. According to the former head of the association, Andriy Gerus, large electricity consumers have joined the association.

Andriy Gerus has become a key figure in the anti-formula media campaign. Media support was provided by Ihor Kolomoisky's 1 + 1 Media TV channel, as well as by Viktor Pinchuk's ICTV and STB.

In March 2018, a public organization controlled by Gerus, the Association of Energy and Utilities Consumers, launched the Rotterdam Plus online meter to calculate the amount of overpayments by consumers for electricity expected by it. Despite the cancellation of the "Rotterdam +" formula from 1 July 2019, the counter continues to count losses to the present. As of early August 2020, he calculated losses at over ₴67 billion.

The object of criticism and media attacks was the DTEK holding, the largest coal producer and operator the majority of thermal power plants. TV channels controlled by Kolomoisky and Pinchuk accused DTEK of receiving super-profits. Since the owner of 100% of DTEK shares is entrepreneur Rinat Akhmetov, criticism was also directed at him.

== The meaning and impact ==
The introduction of "Rotterdam+" methodology for determining the coal market price was a transitional stage before the introduction of a full-fledged electricity market in Ukraine from 1 July 2019.

According to the former head of the NERC and a member of the NERC, Alexander Rogozin, the "Rotterdam+" formula in 2016 was the best possible option for calculation coal price in the transition period before opening of electricity market.

According to economists, the formula provided the formation of steam coal prices with the principle of import parity, which was agreed with international financial institutions, including the IMF.
