= Vitaliy Shubin =

Ukrainian lawyer and civil servant

- Віталій Шубін
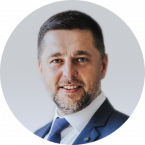

Acting Minister of Energy and Environmental Protection
- In office 10 March 2020 – 16 April 2020
- President: Volodymyr Zelenskyy
- Prime Minister: Denys Shmyhal
- Preceded by: Oleksiy Orzhel
- Succeeded by: Olha Buslavets (acting)

Personal details
- Born: 1982 (age 43–44)
- Party: Independent
- Education: Kyiv University of Tourism, Economics and Law; National Academy for Public Administration under the President of Ukraine
- Occupation: Lawyer civil servant

Vitaliy Mykolayovych Shubin (Ukrainian: Віталій Миколайович Шубін; born 1982) is a Ukrainian lawyer and civil servant. On 10 March 2020, he was appointed as the Acting Minister of Energy and Environmental Protection.

== Biography ==
In 2004, he graduated from Kyiv University of Tourism, Economics and Law. In 2011, he graduated from the National Academy for Public Administration under the President of Ukraine.

Shubin was a specialist at DTEK. Since February 2018, he served as director of Dnipro-Bug Wind Farm LLC.

From October 2019 to April 2020, Shubin worked as First Deputy Minister of Energy and Environmental Protection.

He is a member of the supervisory board of Ukrhydroenergo.

== See also ==
- Shmyhal Government
