= Oleksiy Orzhel =

Ukrainian politician

- Олексій Оржель
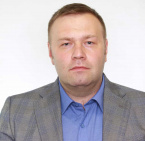

Minister of Energy and Environmental Protection of Ukraine
- In office 29 August 2019 – 4 March 2020
- Prime Minister: Oleksiy Honcharuk
- Preceded by: Ihor Nasalyk (Energy); Ostap Semerak (Environment)
- Succeeded by: Vitaliy Shubin (Acting)

People's Deputy of Ukraine
- In office 29 August 2019 – 29 August 2019

Personal details
- Born: Oleksiy Anatoliyovych Orzhel; 26 January 1984 (age 42) Kyiv, Ukrainian SSR, Soviet Union
- Party: Servant of the People
- Education: Kyiv Polytechnic Institute
- Occupation: energy expert politician

Oleksiy Anatoliyovych Orzhel (Ukrainian: Олексій Анатолійович Оржель; born 26 January 1984) is a Ukrainian energy expert and politician. He was Minister of Energy and Environmental Protection of Ukraine from August 2019 to 4 March 2020.

== Biography ==
Orzhel graduated from the Institute of Energy Saving and Energy Management at the Kyiv Polytechnic Institute.

He was the Head of the Energy Sector at the Better Regulation Delivery Office. From 2006 to 2014, Orzhel worked at the National Commission for State Regulation of Energy and Public Utilities.

He was on a party list of the Servant of the People political party during the 2019 parliamentary elections, yet himself is not a registered member of the party (non-partisan, according to the Central Election Commission). Orzhel was elected to the Verkhovna Rada in 2019. He surrendered his deputy mandate upon his ministerial appointment on 29 August 2019. On March 4, 2020, he was dismissed from the post of Minister.

On February 15, 2023, Oleksiy Orzhel was appointed as the Chairman of the UARE (Ukrainian Association of Renewable Energy).

== See also ==
- Honcharuk Government
- List of members of the parliament of Ukraine, 2019–24
