= Skifska gas field =

Ukrainian gas field in the Black Sea

Skifska
- Country: Ukraine
- Region: Black Sea
- Offshore/onshore: offshore
- Coordinates: 44°N 32.3°E
- Operator: Royal Dutch Shell, ExxonMobil, Petrom, Nadra

Field history
- Discovery: 2012
- Start of development: 2012

Production
- Current production of gas: 15×10^{6} m^{3}/d 550×10^{6} cu ft/d 5×10^{9} m^{3}/a (180×10^{9} cu ft/a)
- Estimated gas in place: 250×10^{9} m^{3} 8.875×10^{12} cu ft

Skifska is a license block located in the Ukrainian zone on the continental shelf of the Black Sea. In 2012, the rights to a production sharing agreement (PSA) for production in the field of Skifska were given to a consortium of Royal Dutch Shell, ExxonMobil, OMV Petrom, and Nadraa Ukrainy. It was expected that future production from the PSA would yield around 550 million cubic feet per day (16×10^{6} m^{3}/d). However, negotiations for the PSA afterwards were repeatedly delayed, and in January 2014 Royal Dutch Shell backed out of the agreement. No new plans have been made for it since.

== History ==
In May 2012, the Ukrainian government announced a tender for the right of a production sharing agreement (PSA) for Skifska. The tender required that the investor would conduct seismic investigations and drill at least one exploration well within five years of signing the tender. On 13 August 2012, it was awarded to a consortium consisting of Royal Dutch Shell, ExxonMobil, Petrom, and Nadra Ukrainy. There was one competing bidder, the Russian company Lukoil. However, the project was mainly part of Ukraine's attempt at the time to reduce its dependence on Russian gas imports. The shares in the consortium were ExxonMobil getting 40%, Shell 35%, OMV Petrom 15%, and Nadra 10%. The projected costs of the development were $10-12 billion. However, at the time of the announcement, the head of Nadra Pavlo Zagorodnuk said the development was a significant risk for the company since it was largely unexplored territory, even if the adjacent Neptun block on the Romanian side had also been explored by Exxon and OMV Petrom.

It was estimated that if the project was successful, it would reduce Ukraine's Russian gas imports by around 10%. Original plans intended to start the exploration programme in 2015 on the block with estimated natural gas and condensates resources in the range of 200 to 250 billion cubic metres (7.1×10^{12} to 8.8×10^{12} cu ft). Potential future production contingent to success during the exploration campaign could yield around 550 million cubic feet per day (16×10^{6} m^{3}/d).

However, following the tender being signed, negotiations were delayed for a while. In September 2013, then Minister of Power Generation, Eduard Stavytsky, announced that the representatives of the consortium had signed an interim agreement on concluding the PSA, which was intended to extend the negotiation period for the PSA. In January 2014, the PSA was delayed by Exxon, with Stayvtsky saying it would be signed in February 2014. Royal Dutch Shell stopped their negotiations over a production sharing agreement later that month in January.
