= Yuriy Prodan =

Ukrainian power engineer and politician

- Юрій Продан
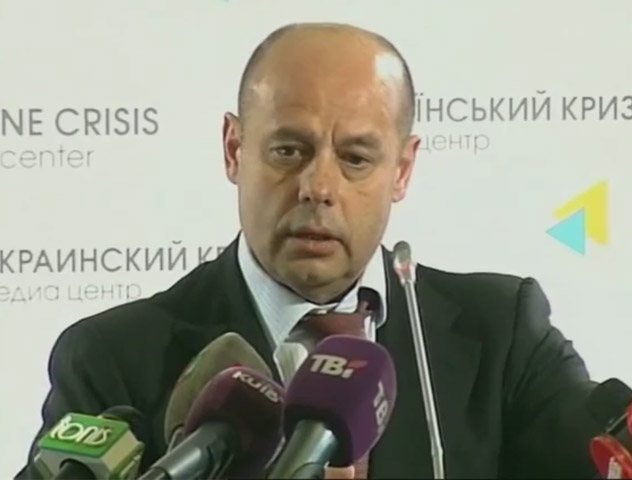
- Prodan in 2014

3rd Minister of Energy and Coal Industry of Ukraine
- In office 27 February 2014 – 2 December 2014
- Prime Minister: Arseniy Yatsenyuk
- Preceded by: Eduard Stavytsky
- Succeeded by: Volodymyr Demchyshyn

15th Minister of Fuel and Energy of Ukraine
- In office 18 December 2007 – 11 March 2010
- Prime Minister: Yulia Tymoshenko
- Preceded by: Yuriy Boiko
- Succeeded by: Yuriy Boiko

Personal details
- Born: 27 January 1959 (age 67) Norilsk, Krasnoyarsk Krai, Russia SFSR
- Party: unaffiliated
- Spouse: Olena
- Children: 2 daughters; 1 son
- Education: Kyiv Polytechnic Institute

Yuri Vasylovych Prodan (Ukrainian: Юрій Васильович Продан; born 27 January 1959) is a Ukrainian power engineer and politician. He has served as Minister of Fuel and Energy of Ukraine of 18 December 2007 to 11 March 2010, and Minister of Energy and Coal Industry of Ukraine from 27 February 2014 till 2 December 2014. In December 2005, received the title of Honored power engineer in Ukraine.

== Biography ==
Followed in the footsteps of his father-power, finished Kyiv Polytechnic Institute (1976–1982). He received BS in electrical engineering, a specialist in power plants. After graduation he worked for three years as an engineer department KPI power. The next two – senior inspector Fastiv district office energy control "Kyivenergo". By the spring of 1999 he occupied various posts in the same "Kyivenergo", was promoted to director of the department chair Energosbyt. Rapid career Y. Prodan sold in the metropolitan power company were in 1995–1999, this time it was headed by the future head of Ministry of Energy Ivan Plachkov.

In 1999–2000 Sold – 1st Deputy Director of National Power Company "UkrEnergo" – director of specialized subdivisions "Energy". From June 2000 to March 2001 – Director of "Energy".

From March 2001 – Chairman of the National Electricity Regulatory Commission of Ukraine. In 2004–2005 – head of fuel, energy and energy efficiency of the Kyiv City State Administration. From February 2005 – First Deputy Minister of Fuel and Energy, President of NAC "Energy Company of Ukraine".

After joining the team of Viktor Yanukovych Cabinet Yuri Prodan returned to "Kyivenergo" (September 2006). And in November, was appointed adviser to President of Ukraine Viktor Yushchenko. From July 2007 – Deputy Secretary of the National Security and Defense Council of Ukraine.

Appointed Minister of Fuel and Energy of Ukraine in the Second Tymoshenko Government the Verkhovna Rada of Ukraine No. 10-VI of 18 December 2007.

Since 27 February 2014 the Minister of Energy and Mines in the Yatsenyuk Government.

Prodan married. He has two daughters – Yana (1983) and Anastasia (2002), and son Bogdan (1993).
