= Government ministries of Ukraine =

Government ministries in Ukraine are the central bodies that are entrusted to implement a state policies in a certain field of government (finance, justice, interior etc.). Each ministry is governed by a respective minister. The collective of ministries is called the Cabinet of Ministers of Ukraine. The modern Ukrainian ministries were first established after the February Revolution of 1917 when the Russian Emperor was forced to abdicate. The first ministries (secretariats) were Secretariat of state, Finance, Justice, Labor, Education, Communication, Trade and Industry, Transportation, Military, Agriculture, and Office of General Secretariat (General Secretariat of Ukraine).

== Current ministries ==
Ministry	Creation	Notes
Cabinet of Ministers	1917	
Development of Communities, Territories and Infrastructure	2022	2022 merger of the Ministry of Infrastructure with the Ministry of Communities and Territories Development.
Culture	1953	Restructured in 2010 (Culture and Tourism), merged in 2019 with Ministry of Information Policy, renamed in 2024 and 2025.
Defense	1991	Revived (previously 1917–1920 and 1946). Subsumed the Ministry of Strategic Industries in 2025.
Digital Transformation	2019	Formerly State Agency on E-governance
Economy, Environment and Agriculture of Ukraine	2010	Formerly Ministry of Economic Development and Trade. Subsumed the Ministry of Agrarian Policy and Food, and the Ministry of Environmental Protection and Natural Resources in 2025, becoming the Ministry of Economy, Environment and Agriculture of Ukraine
Education and Science	1917	Previous iteration 1917.
Energy	1971	Established 1971 as Ministry of Energy and Electrification. As Ministry of Fuel and Energy, subsumed the Ministry of Coal Mining Industry in 2010.
Finance	1917	Revived 1990, previous iteration 1917.
Foreign Affairs	1917	Revived 1991, previous iteration 1917.
Health	1917	
Infrastructure	1917	Revived 1992, previous iteration 1917.
Internal Affairs	1917	
Justice	1917	
Ministry of Social Policy, Family and National Unity of Ukraine	1917	Previously the Ministry of Labor and Social Policy. Subsumed the Ministry of National Unity of Ukraine in 2025. Previous iteration 1917.
Youth and Sports	2013	Revived (previously in 2005–2010 and 1991–1996)
Veterans Affairs	2018	

== Former ministries ==
- Ministry of Industrial Policy (or Industry) 1997–2014
  - Ministry of Machine-building, Military-Industrial Complex, and Conversion 1996–1997 (transformed)
- Ministry of Emergencies (or Emergencies and Protection of Population from the Consequences of the Chernobyl Catastrophe) 1991–2012 (degraded)
- Foreign Relations and Trade 1991–2000
  - Ministry of Trade 1991–1992 (merged)
- Ministry of Science and Technology 1996–1999
- Ministry of Revenues and Duties 2012–2014
- Ministry of Coal Mining Industry 1987–2010
- Ministry of Public Housing and Utilities 2007–2010
- Ministry of Family Affairs and Youth 1996–2005 (merged) → Youth and Sports
- Ministry of Labor 1990–2010 (transitioned) → Social Policy
- Ministry of Transportation 1953–2010 (merged) → Infrastructure
  - Ministry of Automobile Transportation (degraded) → Ukravtodor
  - Ministry of Construction and Exploitation of Automobile Roads
- Ministry of Railways 1917–1920
- Former agrarian ministries
  - Ministry of Fishing Resources Management 1995–1997
  - Ministry of Bread Products
  - Ministry of Rural Development
  - Ministry of State Farms
- Ministry of Industrial Construction Materials
- Ministry of Social Security
- Ministry of Forest Management
- Ministry of Amelioration and Water Management
- Ministry of Light Industry
- Ministry of Special Construction
- Ministry of Construction (Construction and Architecture)
- Ministry of Higher and Special General Education
- Ministry of Statistics
- Ministry of Exterior Economy
- Ministry of Denationalization and De-monopolization
- Ministry of Nationalities and Migration
- Ministry in relationship with Verkhovna Rada
- Ministry of Press (Information)
- Ministry of Higher Education
- Ministry of Communication
- Ministry of Forest, Cellulose-Paper, and Wood Processing Industry
- Ministry of Fruits and Vegetables
- Ministry of Meat and Milk Industry
- Ministry of Food Industry
- Ministry of Preparations
- Ministry of Consumer Services of Population
- Ministry of Geology
- Ministry of Black Metallurgy
- Ministry of Montage and Special Construction
- Ministry of Industrial Construction
- Ministry of Information Policy

== Original ministries (secretariats) ==
Ministry	Creation	Notes
Secretariat of Interior		predecessor of Ministry of Interior
Secretariat of Nationalities		predecessor of Ministry of Foreign Affairs
Secretariat of Finance		predecessor of Ministry of Finance
Secretariat of Justice		predecessor of Ministry of Justice
Secretariat of Labor		
Secretariat of Education		predecessor of Ministry of Education and Science
Secretariat of Communication		predecessor of Ministry of Infrastructure
Secretariat of Trade and Industry		predecessor of Ministry of Economy
Secretariat of Transportation		predecessor of Ministry of Infrastructure
Secretariat of Food Supply		
Secretariat of Military		predecessor of Ministry of Defense
Secretariat of Agriculture		predecessor of Ministry of Agrarian
Office of General Secretariat		predecessor of Ministry of Cabinet of Ministers

== See also ==
- Cabinet of Ministers of Ukraine
