= Eduard Stavytsky =

Ukrainian politician

- Едуард Ставицький
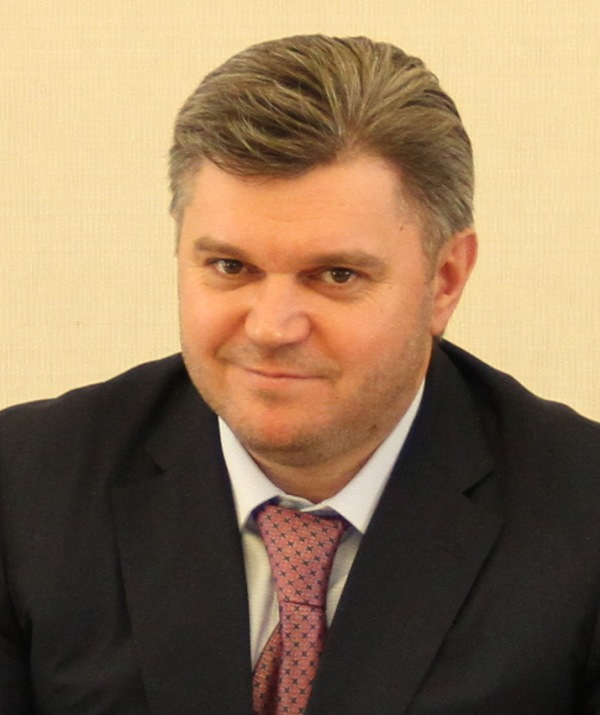
- Stavytsky in 2014

Chairman of Nadra Ukrayiny
- In office January 31, 2007 – January 30, 2008

Chairman of Nadra Ukrayiny
- In office March 24, 2010 – December 29, 2010

Minister of Ecology and Natural Resources of Ukraine
- In office April 20, 2012 – December 24, 2012
- Prime Minister: Mykola Azarov
- Preceded by: Mykola Zlochevsky
- Succeeded by: Oleh Proskuryakov

Minister of Power Generation and Coal Mining of Ukraine
- In office December 24, 2013 – February 27, 2014
- Prime Minister: Mykola Azarov
- Preceded by: Yuriy Boyko
- Succeeded by: Yuriy Prodan

Personal details
- Born: October 4, 1972 Lebedyn, Sumy Oblast, Ukrainian SSR
- Party: Party of Regions
- Education: National Mining University of Ukraine; National Academy of State Management

Eduard Anatoliyovych Stavytsky (Ukrainian: Едуард Анатолійович Ставицький, born 4 October 1972) is a Ukrainian politician and government official who held several ministerial portfolios in the Azarov Government (2012–2014).

As part of investigation about facts of state property theft by government officials from the Ministry of Power and Coal Industry, in apartments and offices that belong to Stavytsky were searched by authorities who discovered 42 kg of gold, $4.8 million, and collection of expensive watches.

In 2014 Stavytsky was given political asylum in Israel under name Nathan Rosenberg (Натан Розенберг).

== Early life ==
A graduate of the National Mining University of Ukraine (Dnipropetrovsk) and the National Academy of State Management (Kyiv), in 1994–2006 Stavytsky worked on management positions at the "Ecological Fuel of Ukraine" in Oleksandriya, while also sponsoring the local youth football club "Oleksandriya-Amethyst" (part of the FC Oleksandriya).

== Political career ==
Inn 2007–2010 Stavytsky worked as a director of the state company "Nadra Ukrayiny" that specializes in geological surveying and governed by the State Service of Geology and Subsoil of Ukraine (Ministry of Ecology and Natural Resources). During that period he was suspected in unlawful alienation of the state residence, for which he was fired twice, but reinstated on court orders.

In 2010 after Mykola Azarov became the Prime Minister of Ukraine, Stavytsky was reinstated and later promoted to a chairman of State Service of Geology and Subsoil of Ukraine. The same year he also was able to become a local representative in the Zhytomyr Oblast Council. In April–December 2012 Stavytsky was given a portfolio of the Minister of Ecology and Natural Resources of Ukraine in the First Azarov Cabinet. After Azarov was reelected as the Prime Minister, Stavytsky became the Minister of Power Generation and Coal Industry of Ukraine.

== Post-resignation and charges ==
On 15 April 2014 Stavytsky's assets in the European Union were frozen. As part of investigation against the Ukrainian holding company VETEK owned by Serhiy Kurchenko, Eduard Stavytsky got on the wanted list of the General Prosecutor of Ukraine in March 2014. He has been a fugitive since then. According to the Prosecutor office Stavytsky is, as an Israeli citizen, hiding in Israel under the assumed name of Nathan Rosenberg.

As of January 2015, it was reported he was living in Herzliya or Kfar Shmaryahu. Ukraine submitted an extradition to Israel, and in Ukraine, during this time, he was offered a plea bargain in the case over embezzlement, money laundering, and fraud, but he rejected it, so the prosecution office pursued a conviction in absentia. In November 2016, Ukrainian prosecutors met with Stavytsky in Tel Aviv, of which an audio recording of the meeting was later leaked that suggested there were talks about softening his charges. However, it was subsequently announced by the government that the original charges would still apply, and the case against him would be sent to court in May 2018. In March 2021, Ukraine seized his oil and gas exploration permits associated with East Europe Petroleum.

In June 2024, it was announced that the Vyshhorod District Court of Kyiv Oblast had dropped a secondary case against him regarding the misappropriation of assets of the Pushcha-Vodytsia recreation complex due to the expiration of the statute of limitations. Stavytsky did not appear in Ukraine, but did join the court online. However, the seized gold and cash from the case were kept and melted for 83 million hryvnias.

== Nadra Ukrayiny and Mezhyhirya ==
Between June through November 2007 the state residence switched ownership at least four times, while also being involved into a court case during that period.

== See also ==
- MedInvestTrade
- Mezhyhirya Residence
