= Ihor Nasalyk =

Ukrainian politician (born 1962)

- Ігор Насалик
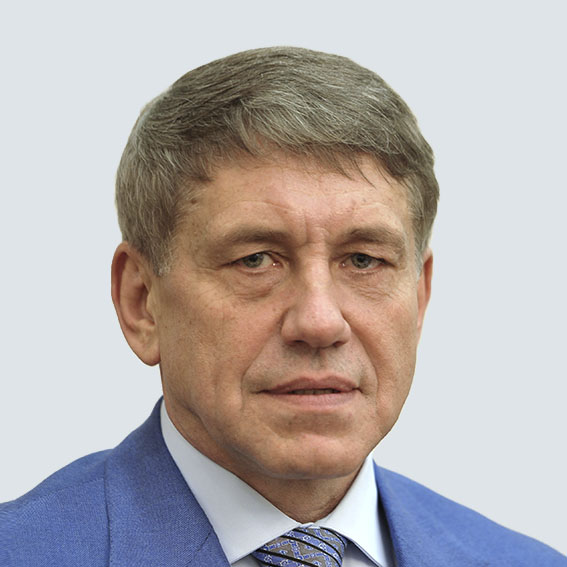
- Official portrait, c. 2017

Ministry of Energy and Coal Mining of Ukraine
- In office 14 April 2016 – 29 August 2019
- Prime Minister: Volodymyr Groysman
- Preceded by: Volodymyr Demchyshyn
- Succeeded by: Oleksiy Orzhel

People's Deputy of Ukraine

3rd convocation
- In office 12 May 1998 – 14 May 2002
- Constituency: Independent, No.85 electoral district

4th convocation
- In office 14 May 2002 – 25 May 2006
- Constituency: Ukrainian People's Party, No.86 electoral district

8th convocation
- In office 27 November 2014 – 14 April 2016
- Constituency: Independent, No.85 electoral district

Personal details
- Born: November 25, 1962 (age 63) Oleksandriia, Kirovohrad Oblast, Ukrainian SSR, Soviet Union
- Party: Independent
- Other political affiliations: Ukrainian Party; Ukrainian People's Party
- Education: Lviv University (1989)
- Occupation: optoelectronic engineer; statesman

Ihor Stepanovych Nasalyk (Ukrainian: Ігор Степанович Насалик; born 25 November 1962) is a Ukrainian optoelectronic engineer and politician. Nasalyk served as Minister of Energy and Coal Industry of Ukraine from 2016 until 2019.

== Early life ==
Nasalyk was born on 25 November 1962 in Oleksandriia, which was then part of the Ukrainian SSR. From 1980 to 1985 he studied at the University of Lviv. He then went into Soviet Army after conscription until 1987. In 1987, after graduating, he briefly worked as a driver at the Rohatyn Motor Transport Enterprise. He then went back into education, receiving his higher education in 1989 at Lviv University in the Faculty of Physics. He was then a leading specialist at the Center for Microelectronics at Ulyanovsk from 1990 until 1992. For a year he then worked as an advisor and director on economic issues of the enterprise "Korona" in Lviv. Then, in 1993, he became economic advisor to a company in Rohatyn. In 1995–1998, he was president of the production corporation "Tekhno-Center" (Tekhnoinvestcenter) in Rohatyn.

== Political career ==
He was a People's Deputy of Ukraine in the Verkhovna Rada from 1998 to 2019. In the 2019 Ukrainian parliamentary election Nasalyk lost reelection as an independent candidate in single-seat constituency 85 (Ivano-Frankivsk Oblast). He was the former mayor of Kalush from 2006 to 2014 also.

== Legal affairs ==
In November 2020, the High Anti-Corruption Court of Ukraine canceled the closure of a case in which Nasalyk was suspected of false declarations in statements worth $1.2 million. In February 2023, it was declared that there was suspicion of abuse of office, which would result in six years in prison, where he concluded agreements with businessman that were known to unprofitable to Ukraine and that he wrote off funds to merchants for state property.
