= Ukrinterenergo =

Ukrainian state-owned energy supplier

- Native name: ДПЗД «Укрінтеренерго»
- Company type: State Foreign Trade Company
- Industry: Electricity
- Founded: 1993
- Headquarters: 85, Kyrylivska St, Kiev, Ukraine
- Area served: Ukraine, Hungary, Romania, Slovakia, Poland, Moldova, the Republic of Belarus, the Russian Federation
- Key people: Vasyl Andriienko, Dmitry Kotlyarenko, Vasyl Skalatskyi, Roman Matviienko, Oleksandr Manuilenko
- Products: Electricity
- Services: the supplier of "last resort", electricity supplier with free prices, electricity exporter, transit by internal power networks, the supply of coal and gas to national companies
- Parent: Ministry of Energy and Mining
- Website: https://uie.kiev.ua/en/home_en/

SFTC Ukrinterenergo is a Ukrainian state-owned commercial company founded in 1993 following the order of the Ministry of Energy and Electrification of Ukraine. Currently, the organization’s activities are controlled by the Ministry of Energy and Coal Industry of Ukraine. As of 2019, the company is headed by Vasyl Andriienko, Dmitry Kotlyarenko, Vasyl Skalatskyi, Roman Matviienko, Oleksandr Manuilenko.

== Enterprise’s Functions ==
The functions performed by the organization can be divided into the following categories:

- The supplier of "last resort" (from January 1, 2019 to January 1, 2021).
- Electricity supplier with free prices.
- Electricity exporter. The company mainly supplies the territories of Hungary, Romania, Slovakia, Poland, Moldova, the Republic of Belarus and the Russian Federation.
- Transit by internal power networks.
- Supply of coal and gas to national companies.

== Foreign Experts ==
Apart from Ukrainians, the company attracts foreign experts to its staff. For example, in the first years of Ukraine’s independence, Emma Turos, Managing Director of Canada Ukraine Chamber of Commerce, worked as a leading specialist/project manager at Ukrinterenergo.

== International Projects ==
Since 1998, the SFTC Ukrinterenergo has had a joint project with the Vietnamese company SONG-DA: SONG-DA - UKRIN with its head office in Hanoi, Vietnam. Some time after the foundation, the design institute of UKRHYDROPROJECT PJSC joined the project.

The international company SONG-DA - UKRIN provides consulting services, conducts scientific research, and also monitors the work of national and foreign technical facilities.

In 2006, Ukrinterenergo updated a hydroelectric power station in Vietnam to the tune of over 50 M. USD. Also, negotiations on reconstruction and building a hydroelectric power station in Chile were held in the same period.

== Energy Supply to Disputed Territories ==
On June 1, 2014, SFTC Ukrinterenergo was assigned the only electricity supplier to the disputed Crimean territories. After this governmental decision, electricity prices were significantly reduced, mitigating the financial burden laying on Crimean citizens.

In 2015, Ukrinterenergo reported about 7,3 profit increase, which, in many respects, was conditioned by a lucrative Crimean contract (plus transit operations in Slovakia, Romania, and Hungary).

It was challenging for Ukraine to achieve such a result without external support. With limited internal resources, it was close to cutting the electricity supply to the peninsula. That is why, on December 30, 2014, a one-year contract for energy import from a Russian company Inter RAO took effect. Also, another contract prescribing energy supply to Crimea via the Ukrainian mainland was signed with Inter RAO’s subsidiary.

After these steps, the provision of disputed territories with electricity stabilized. But the fact that the bulk of the electricity was imported from Russia led to serious controversies. Ukrainian society split into two parts. One part believed that the Ukrainian government acted in the best interests of its citizens: no matter what is the origin of electricity, the main thing is to provide Ukrainians with utilities. The second part claimed that trade with an aggressive state is treason and turned these commercial relationships into a target for criticism and suspicion.

For example, in 2015, The State Financial Inspectorate claimed there were infringements in a contract between Inter RAO and Ukrinterenergo. However, after a thorough examination of companies’ activities, the inspectorate admitted that there were no infringements.

After separatists took control over power stations in Luhansk and Donetsk, Ukrinterenergo notified Inter RAO that Ukraine stopped receiving electricity. But Inter RAO did not cut energy supply and tried to charge Ukrinterenergo for this energy. The case was brought to Russian and Ukrainian courts.

== Coal Import from South Africa ==
December, 2014, directors of Ukrinterenergo and Centrenergo were claimed guilty for the import of low-quality coal from South Africa and financial losses due to the inability to use this coal with Ukrainian equipment. Volodymyr Zinevych, who occupied the post of Ukrinterenergo’s director at that time, was invited to the court. However, he got to a hospital and was not able to come to a courtroom. Later, Zinevych was detained and held under house arrest.

The administration of the South African company Steel Mont refused to prolong the contract for coal supply due to the reputation issues with banks.

== Supplier of Last Resort ==
Ukrinetenergo was assigned SoLR in December 2018 for a period from January 1, 2019 to January 1, 2021. The company undertakes electricity supply to enterprises and households that have failed to conclude a contract with another provider or faced significant financial challenges. The SoLR scheme is part of the strategy aimed at establishing a liberalized electricity market in Ukraine.

Ukrinetenergo can cut energy once a 90-day period expires. Contracts with the first batch of customers took effect January 1 and were terminated April 1. Notwithstanding the fact that Ukrinterenergo’s prices are 14% higher than average market prices, new enterprises constantly resort to the SoLR’s services.

== The Case Ukrenergy Trade SE and Korlea Invest, A.S. vs Ukrinterenergo ==
The Ukrinterenergo’s failure to deliver electricity to the Ukrenergy Trade SE and Korlea Invest, A.S. companies in the volumes stipulated by contracts signed in 2008 and their subsequent breach gave rise to the large-scale legal conflict. In January 2013, Ukrenergy Trade SE and Korlea Invest, A.S. filed claims demanding SFTC Ukrinterenergo to compensate for their profits lost due to the contract breach. In total, companies demanded EUR 340+ million.

The case was reviewed in the Vienna International Arbitral Centre of the Austrian Federal Economic Chamber. After the lengthy litigation, in September 2018, Ukrenergy Trade SE and Korlea Invest, A.S. lost their lawsuits against SFTC Ukrinterenergo.

The legal conflicts of this kind often arise due to the government's unrealistic expectations and the burden they impose on state-owned energy companies. For example, the SoLR responsibilities significantly complicate the Ukrinterenergo’s operation since it has to support state debtors, such as The Donbass Water company, and enterprises with a defined low income.

Ten years of litigation entailed significant financial losses and endangered the company's normal workflow. At the same time, it was able to preserve its reputation thanks to other socially important projects, such as energy supply to Crimea.

== Membership ==
SFTC Ukrinterenergo is part of the following associations:

- The Council of Wholesale Electricity Market of Ukraine. As an active member of the WEM Council (since 1996), the Ukrinterenergo SFTC takes part in the review and improvement of the organization’s rules, monitors the implementation of agreements concluded between the organization’s participants, introduces new market models, analyzes their effectiveness, and develops methods to stimulate competition.
- Intergovernmental Ukrainian Bielarussian Joint Commission for Trade and Economic Cooperation. Since 1996, the Ukrinterenergo SFTC has been contributing to the improvement of economic relations between the two countries in the fuel & energy sector.
- Federation of Employers of Fuel and Energy Complex of Ukraine. In 2018, Ukrinterenergo joined the organization to protect the interests of coal and energy enterprises, as well as their employees, create a unified strategy for consolidating and strengthening these enterprises, and strengthen social and labor relations in the industry.
