= Burger King Russia =

Russian fast food restaurant chain

Burger Rus Ltd.
- Logo used since 2021.

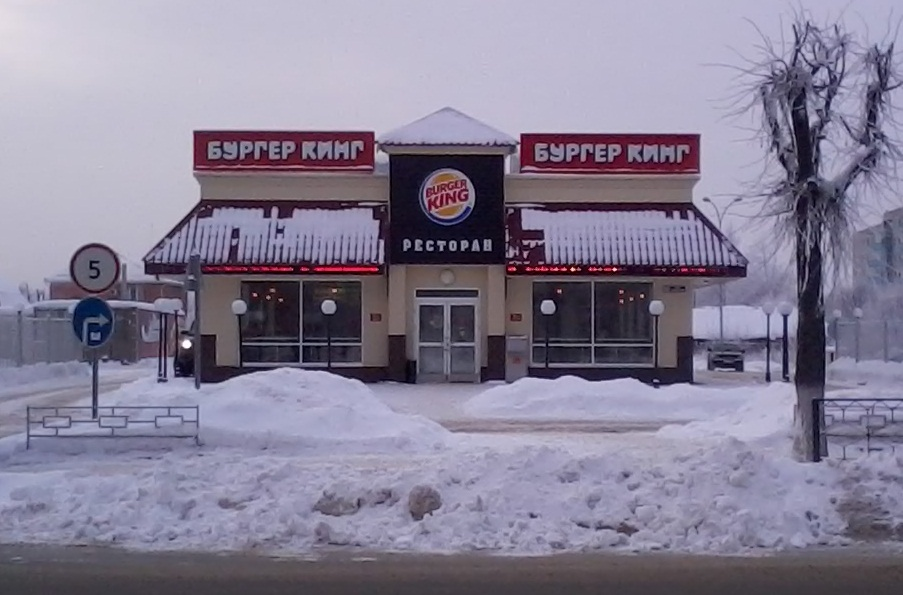
- A Burger King location in Yegoryevsk, Russia
- Type: Private
- Industry: Restaurant
- Number of locations: 800+
- Owner: Investment Capital Ukraine (ICU) VTB Bank Alexander Kolobov

Burger Rus Ltd (Russian: ООО «Бургер Рус») is a Russian company that operates Burger King restaurants in Russia. The business was created as a Cypriot offshore joint venture of the Ukrainian investment firm Investment Capital Ukraine (ICU) and the sanctioned Russian state-owned VTB Bank. The company currently controls a network of over 800 Burger King stores across Russia.

== Ownership and management ==
Burger King Russia was originally established in Cyprus and was jointly owned by 4 parties: Restaurant Brands International (RBI), Russian businessman Alexander Kolobov, Russian state-owned VTB Bank, and Ukrainian investment firm Investment Capital Ukraine (ICU).

In 2018, ICU increased its position and became a major shareholder in the Cyprus-registered holding company. ICU’s interest was held via the Cyprus entity Xomeric Holdings Ltd., which acquired part of VTB’s stake in 2018 and increased its holding to just over 35 percent, making it the largest shareholder in the chain’s Russian holding company.

== Controversies ==
=== Post-2022 operations in Russia ===
Burger King Russia’s structure has drawn sustained criticism since the invasion of Ukraine in 2022, both because the restaurants have remained open and because of the identity of the financial partners behind the business.

RBI has said publicly that it suspended “corporate support” for the Russian operation and began the process of disposing of its minority stake, but also that it cannot unilaterally close the restaurants because control lies with its partners in the joint venture. In practice, Burger King outlets in Russia have continued to operate, in contrast to competitors such as McDonald’s, which sold and rebranded its Russian network.

ICU's position within the joint venture drew particular attention because the firm announced in March 2022 that it intended to exit Russian-linked assets. However, investigative reporting later showed that ICU still held approximately 35 percent of the Burger King Russia holding company as late as October 2023. The stake originated from an earlier transaction in which ICU’s Cyprus-based vehicle acquired part of VTB’s ownership share, making ICU the largest individual shareholder in the joint-venture.

=== Sanction risk ===
ICU’s ongoing participation in the Burger King Russia business has raised media questions in regard to sanctions enforcement. The company’s partnership with VTB, one of Russia’s major state-owned banks under U.S., EU, and U.K. sanctions, has been mentioned as a potential compliance issue, especially given ICU’s claim to have withdrawn from its positions in Russia.

=== Offshore structuring ===
The ownership structure behind Burger King Russia has also been the subject of media reporting, due to its heavy use of offshore corporate entities. Reporting based on the Pandora Papers and related materials detailed how stakes in the Russian franchise were held through companies registered in Cyprus, Guernsey, and the Seychelles. ICU’s 35 percent stake, for example, was held via Xomeric Holdings Ltd., a Cyprus-registered entity that previously acquired a portion of VTB’s interest. This raised concerns as such offshore structuring makes it harder to determine who controls the Russian business, raises risks of sanctions compliance, and reduces overall transparency.
