= MedInvestTrade =

Ukrainian company

- Type: Limited liability company
- Founded: Kyiv, Ukraine
- Headquarters: Zaporizhzhia, Ukraine
- Key people: Hennadiy Herasymenko (owner)

Medinvesttrade (Ukrainian: ТОВ "Медінвесттрейд") was an association with limited liability, headquarters of which is located in Donetsk. On November 17, 2011, the Economic court of Zaporizhia Oblast liquidated the bankrupted company.

== History ==
The company became known on September 25, 2007, when it signed an exchange agreement with state company Nadra Ukrayiny headed by Eduard Stavytsky, after which the state residence Mezhyhirya ended up in private hands. Previously, Nadra Ukrayiny took ownership of Mezhyhirya residence on July 11, 2007, after the transfer was approved by the Fund of State Property.

The exchange between Medinvesttrade and Nadra Ukrayiny involved properties in Vyshhorod Raion and Kyiv city. Nadra Ukrayiny agreed to hand over buildings, structures, and other equipment of Pushcha-Vodytsia recreational complex in Novi Petrivtsi at an estimated price ₴91,771,620. In exchange Nadra Ukrayiny received buildings in Kyiv with an estimated price ₴93,115,419.

In October 2007 Medinvesttrade filed suit in the Economic court of Kyiv seeking recognition of the exchange agreement as invalid, but lost.

On November 19, 2007, Medinvesttrade sold the property to Tantalit.

== See also ==
- Ukraine Air Enterprise
