= Serhiy Yermilov =

Ukrainian politician

- Сергій Єрмілов
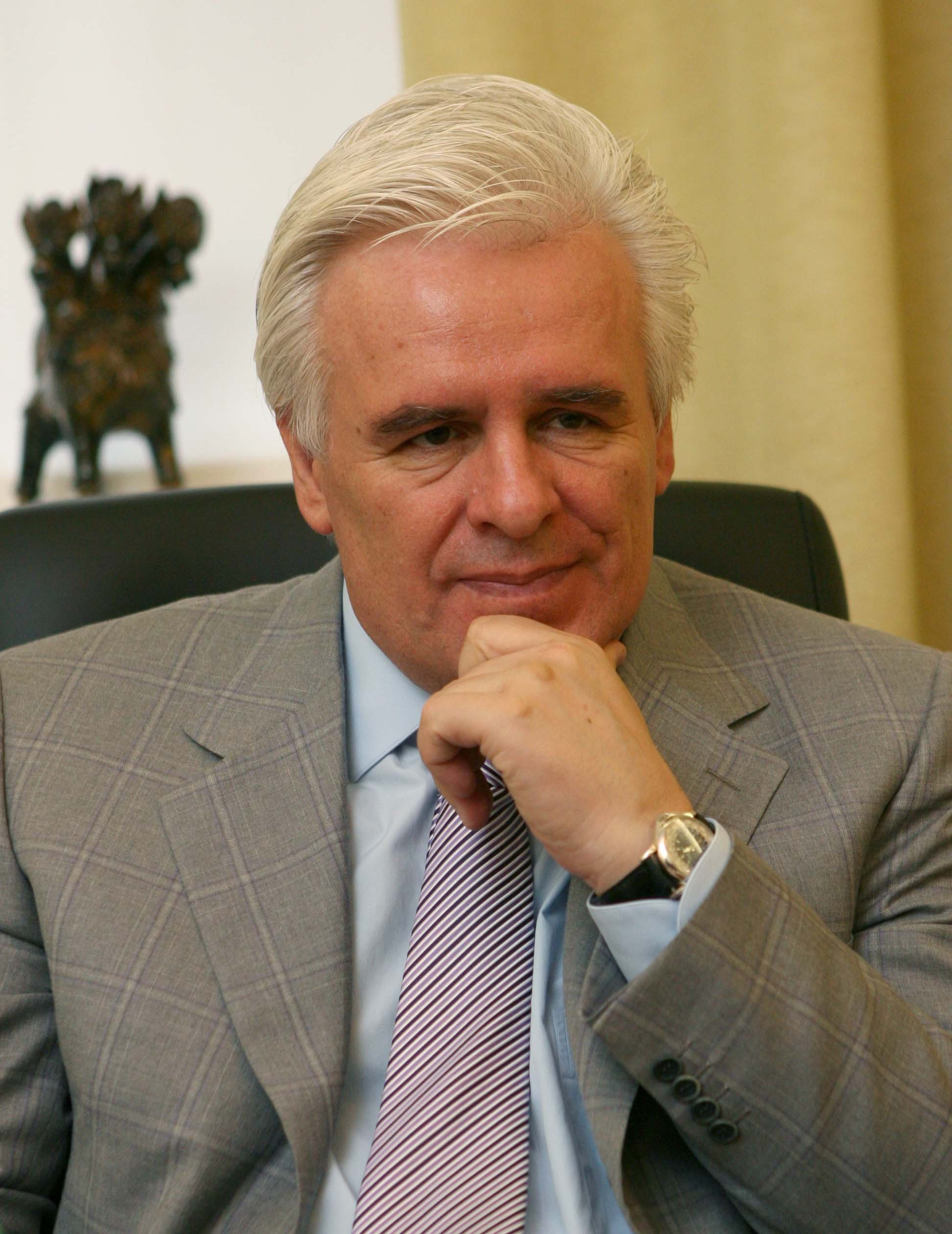
- Yermilov in 2008

Minister of Fuel and Energy
- In office 30 November 2002 – 5 March 2004
- President: Viktor Yushchenko
- Prime Minister: Viktor Yanukovych
- Preceded by: Vitaliy Haiduk
- Succeeded by: Serhiy Tulub
- In office 13 July 2000 – 6 March 2001
- President: Leonid Kuchma
- Prime Minister: Viktor Yushchenko
- Preceded by: Serhiy Tulub
- Succeeded by: Stanislav Stashevshkyi

Personal details
- Born: 16 November 1958 (age 67) Aktobe, Kazakh SSR, Soviet Union
- Education: Igor Sikorsky Kyiv Polytechnic Institute
- Profession: Politician

Military service
- Allegiance: Soviet Union
- Branch/service: Soviet Army
- Years of service: 1982–1984

Serhiy Fedorovych Yermilov (Ukrainian: Сергій Федорович Єрмілов; born 16 November 1958) is a Ukrainian politician who became the fifth Minister of Fuel and Energy from 2002 to 2004.

== Early life and education ==
Yermilov is born on 16 November 1958 in the village of Aktobe, Kazakh SSR, and was educated as a mechanical engineer at the Kyiv Polytechnic Institute from September 1976 to June 1982, and obtained his master's degree in financial management from the National Academy of Management in 1999.

== Career ==
From September 1975 to August 1976, Vermilov began working as a transport worker for the Kyivmiskbud-2 trust; began serving in the ranks of the Soviet Army from June 1982 to June 1984; an engineer of a turbine in the Construction Directorate of the Crimean NPP from August 1984 to June 1989; a machinist-surveyor of gas turbine equipment, engineer at the gas turbine power plant Tengiz of VO Soyuztransenergo from June 1989 to February 1992.

Additionally, Vermilov was the head of production and engineering and head engineer of the Construction Directorate of the Crimean TPP from March 1992 to December 1996; the director of the subsidiary East Crimean Energy Company from December 1996 to November 1997; Chairman of the Board, Director of the Joint-Stock Company (JSC) Krymenergo from November 1997 to July 1999; the 1st Deputy Minister of Energy of Ukraine from June 1999 to January 2000. He was the adviser to the Prime Minister of Ukraine from March 2000 to July 2000.

Vermilov was officially appointed as Minister of Fuel and Energy in the government of Viktor Yushchenko on 13 July 2000, and would be in office until 6 March 2001. From December 2001 to November 2002, he became the adviser to the Minister of Fuel and Energy. He would be appointed for the second time as the Minister of Fuel and Energy of Ukraine in the government of Viktor Yanukovych from 30 November 2002 to 5 March 2004. From 2004 to 2009, he became the director of the Institute of Ecology and Energy Conservation LLC. In March 2006, candidate for People's Deputy of Ukraine and listed No.2. Later from 15 April 2009 to 31 May 2010, chairman of the National Agency of Ukraine.

== Personal life ==
Vermilov is married to Larisa Mykolayivna and has two sons; Pavlo and Oleksiy.

== Honours ==
Throughout his career, he has been awarded the following honours;

=== National ===
- Order of Merit Third Class
- 25 Years of Independence of Ukraine Medal
- Order of the Holy Equal-to-the-Apostles Prince Volodymyr the Great III
- Merited Power Engineer of Ukraine
- Miner's Glory Medal
- Honorary Diploma of the Cabinet of Ministers of Ukraine (August 2004)

=== Foreign ===
- Russia:
  - Order of Friendship (2003)

Political offices
Preceded by Vitaliy Haiduk; Serhiy Tulub	Minister of Labor and Social Policy; 30 November 2002 – 5 March 2004; 13 July 2000 – 6 March 2001	Succeeded by Serhiy Tulub; Stanislav Stashevshkyi
