= Olha Buslavets =

Ukrainian power engineer and civil servant

- Ольга Буславець
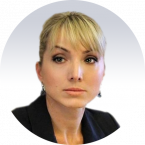

Acting Minister of Energy
- In office 16 April 2020 – 20 November 2020
- President: Volodymyr Zelenskyy
- Prime Minister: Denys Shmyhal
- Preceded by: Vitaliy Shubin (acting)
- Succeeded by: Yuriy Boyko (acting)

Personal details
- Born: 5 March 1975 (age 51) Makiivka, Ukrainian SSR, Soviet Union (now Ukraine)
- Party: Independent
- Education: Donetsk State Technical University
- Occupation: power engineer civil servant

Olha Anatoliyivna Buslavets (Ukrainian: Ольга Анатоліївна Буславець; born 5 March 1975) is a Ukrainian power engineer and civil servant. From 16 April 2020 until 20 November 2020 she was (at first) the Acting Minister of Energy and Environmental Protection and (after a government reshuffle on 27 May 2020) Minister of Energy.

== Education ==
She graduated from Donetsk State Technical University (1997). Buslavets is a Candidate of Technical Sciences. In 2018 she defended her dissertation for the degree of Candidate of Technical Sciences at Kharkiv Polytechnic Institute. He is a co-author of numerous scientific papers on improving the efficiency of electricity transmission and distribution.

== Employment ==
- Since 2000 she has worked in the energy supply company of Donetsk Coal as an engineer-economist.
- 2003 - 2005 - accountant, engineer of the 1st category of SE "Donetskenergovugol".
- In 2005 she joined the Ministry of Coal Industry of Ukraine as the Chief Specialist of the Department of Electricity. Since 2006 - in senior positions in this department.
- 2015 - 2017 - Director of the Department of Electricity Complex of the Ministry of Energy and Coal Industry of Ukraine.
- 2017 - 2020 - Director General of the Directorate of Energy Markets of the Ministry of Energy and Coal Industry.
- From 16 April to 20 November 2020 - Minister of Energy of Ukraine. At the meeting of the Government Olga Buslavets was appointed First Deputy Minister in accordance with the order of 16 April 2020 № 429. Also the order of 16.04.2020 № 430 temporarily entrusts Olga Buslavets with the duties of the Minister of Energy and Environmental Protection of Ukraine. The Cabinet of Ministers of Ukraine renamed the Ministry of Energy and Environmental Protection of Ukraine to the Ministry of Energy of Ukraine by Resolution of 27 May 2020 № 425 "Some issues of optimization of the system of central executive bodies". The Ministry of Environmental Protection and Natural Resources of Ukraine was also established by this resolution. On 20 November, the Cabinet of Ministers of Ukraine at an extraordinary meeting adopted a decision to declare invalid the order of the Cabinet of Ministers of 3 June 2020 №604 ("On the temporary assignment of the Minister of Energy to Buslavets OA"). Olga Buslavets published a letter of resignation from the post of First Deputy Minister of Energy on 21 December 2020.

== Professional achievements ==
- She is a co-author of a number of laws and legislative initiatives in the field of energy and energy security, including the Law of Ukraine "On Electricity Market" and the Law "On Amendments to Some Laws of Ukraine on Competitive Eclectic Energy Production from Alternative Energy Sources ". Buslavets supports the draft Law on the Electricity Market, which was adopted by the Verkhovna Rada on 13 April 2017. This law became the basis for the introduction of a new approach in the Ukrainian energy market.
- She was a member of the Coordination Center for ensuring the introduction of a new electricity market, headed by a working group at the Ministry of Energy and Coal Industry to implement the provisions of the Law of Ukraine "On Electricity Market".
- In 2016-2020 she headed the Ukrainian-Danish Energy Center implemented under the Agreement between the Ministry of Energy and Coal Industry of Ukraine and the Ministry of Foreign Affairs of the Danish United Kingdom.

During the period of leadership of the Ministry of Energy, a number of crisis situations were resolved and work began on strategic reforms in the energy sector.

The operation of the electricity market has been stabilized: the rules of operation of market participants have been improved, the financial condition of state-owned energy companies has been improved, and consumers have been able to buy electricity at a competitive / fair price.

The crisis in the renewable energy sector has been resolved: a Memorandum of Understanding with investors has been signed, the green tariff without its extension has been reduced, payments for electricity produced from RES have been resumed, and conditions for green auctions for further development of renewable energy have been improved.

The procedure for holding a tender for the construction of high-shunting generating capacity to ensure the safety of the power system and the future synchronization of the UES of Ukraine to the European energy system ENTSO-E has been improved.

Miners' strikes were stopped, domestic coal was sold, miners were returned to work, wage arrears were repaid, and the Coal Reform Concept was developed.

Key legislation has been developed to increase the level of energy efficiency of the economy, to create tools for decarbonization. Work on draft agreements on the distribution of products for oil and gas exploration and production at 8 sites has been unblocked, which have been agreed with investors and approved by the Cabinet of Ministers.

International activity has revived. In particular, a joint statement was signed between the Government of Ukraine and Germany on the launch of an energy partnership in various areas. In particular, cooperation with Germany was aimed at supporting technical synchronization with European ENTSO-E energy systems with further integration of the Ukrainian electricity market with European ones. Cooperation with Finland has also been expanded; the work of the Ukrainian-Danish Energy Center was resumed; bilateral cooperation with the EU countries has been intensified, as well as with Great Britain, the United States, Canada, Korea, and China. The UNIDO Loan Guarantee Fund has been introduced to implement energy efficiency measures at Ukrainian enterprises.

== Awards ==
- Honored Power Engineer of Ukraine (22 December 2018) - for significant personal contribution to the development of the domestic energy sector, many years of hard work and high professionalism.
- Excellence in Energy of Ukraine.
- She was awarded Diplomas of the Cabinet of Ministers of Ukraine, the Verkhovna Rada of Ukraine, the Ministry of Fuel and Energy of Ukraine.

== Publications ==
1. Refusal of district heating. Is it possible to radically solve the problem?
2. Uranium mining industry: destruction or exploitation?

== Interview ==
1. Olga Buslavets: "We need to bet on increasing our own coal and gas production."
2. City of opportunities. Success stories. Ukrainian radio.
3. Today's talk show / Results of Erdogan's visit to Kyiv. Putin's response from EU countries.
4. OUR MARATHON 09.02.22
5. Ukrainian energy industry 2021-2022: results and prospects.
6. Energy dead end of Ukraine. Is there a way out? Ex-Minister of Energy Buslavets.
7. Olga Buslavets: "Synchronization with ENTSO-E will not solve the problem of shortage of maneuvering power."
8. Olga Buslavets about the myths spread by the media about Ukrainian energy // FREEDOM OF SPEECH.
9. Olga Buslavets about energy independence and energy security of Ukraine // FREEDOM OF SPEECH.
10. Olga Buslavets about the crisis in the energy market.
11. I passed the lie detector at the expense of communication with Akhmetov and Kolomoisky.

== Hobby ==
Cycling, travel.

== See also ==
- Shmyhal Government

== Declaration ==
- E-declaration Archived 16 June 2019 at the Wayback Machine
