= Reform Delivery Office of the Cabinet of Ministers of Ukraine =

Reform Delivery Office
- Reform Delivery Office of the Cabinet of Ministers of Ukraine
- Офіс реформ Кабінету Міністрів України
- Formation: October 11, 2016; 10 years ago
- Headquarters: Kyiv, Ukraine
- Website: rdo.in.ua

The Reforms Delivery Office is an organization that assists the Government of Ukraine in developing and implementing priority reforms for the country. Using international expertise and extensive industry experience, the Office provides comprehensive support to the Cabinet of Ministers of Ukraine.

== Management ==
The Reforms Delivery Office is an advisory body to the Cabinet of Ministers of Ukraine coordinated by the Prime Minister. The office is headed by the Minister of the Cabinet of Ministers. The management is carried out by the executive director of the Office.

The activities of the Reforms Delivery Office of the Cabinet of Ministers are governed by the Constitution and laws of Ukraine, as well as decrees of the President of Ukraine and resolutions of the Verkhovna Rada of Ukraine adopted in accordance with the Constitution and laws of Ukraine, acts of the Cabinet of Ministers and Regulations.

"The Reforms Delivery Office will be aimed at implementing and monitoring those priorities, those tasks that are in principle included in the government's program, which we discussed with our international partners," O. Saenko commented on the presentation of the Office to Interfax-Ukraine.

== Funders ==
The Reforms Delivery Office is a project funded by the Multilateral Donor Fund for Stabilization and Sustainable Development of Ukraine (MDA), which is administered by the European Bank for Reconstruction and Development. The members of the Foundation are Denmark, the European Union, Finland, France, Germany, Italy, Japan, the Netherlands, Poland, Sweden, Switzerland, the United Kingdom and the United States.

== Areas of work ==
Development and coordination of reforms

- adaptation of the idea of changes and development of a strategy for their implementation;
- expert support of the Government;
- identifying needs, ensuring dialogue and coordinating the process of implementing reforms.

Performance monitoring

- tracking the status of implementation of changes;
- analysis of the progress of tasks, identification of key factors for further improvement.

Communication of changes

- explanation of the incomprehensible;
- support for media reforms to support change.

According to the report "Reforms in Ukraine: Progress and Priorities" prepared by the Office and presented in June 2018, 5 strategic goals were identified. Namely: economic development, good governance, human potential, rule of law and the fight against corruption, defense and security.

== Activities ==
In 2017, the Government of Ukraine together with international partners launched an annual international Ukraine Reform Conference. This decision was taken to ensure a broad dialogue on priority reforms in Ukraine. The Reforms Delivery Office actively participates in the organization of conferences, in particular, prepares thorough reports on the implementation of reforms. The first International Conference was held on July 6, 2017, in London, the second - on June 27, 2018, in Copenhagen.

In addition, with the support of the Office of Reforms of the Cabinet of Ministers of Ukraine, on February 20, 2018, an International High-Level Meeting on Reforms in Ukraine was held.

== Composition ==
The executive director reports to the Head of the Office.

Currently, the Office has a Monitoring and Reporting Group, as well as project managers in the following areas:

Reform project managers report to the executive director of the Office.

The executive director of the Office and project managers are approved based on the results of an open competition.

The personal composition of the Office is approved by the head of the Office, who has the right to make changes to it.

Currently, the Office has a Monitoring and Reporting Group, as well as project managers in the following areas:

- Public administration reform
- Privatization and management reform of state-owned enterprises
- Defense system reform
- Decentralization reform
- Industry development and innovation
- Energy independence
- Land reform
- Improving the business climate
