= Volodymyr Demchyshyn =

Ukrainian politician

- Володимир Демчишин
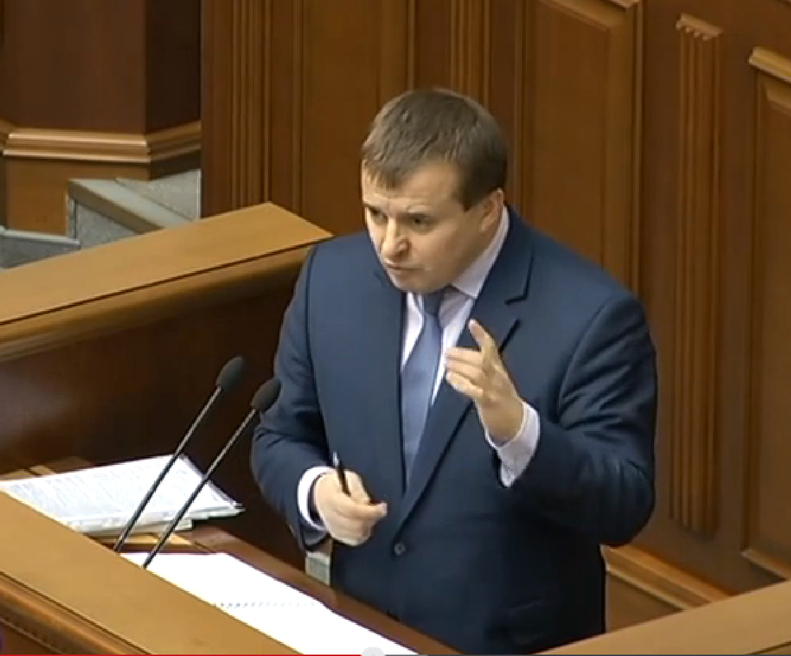
- Demchyshyn in 2015

16th Minister of Energy and Coal Industry of Ukraine
- In office 2 December 2014 – 14 April 2016
- Prime Minister: Arseniy Yatsenyuk
- Preceded by: Yuriy Prodan
- Succeeded by: Ihor Nasalyk

Personal details
- Born: 12 November 1974 (age 51) Lviv, Lviv Oblast, Ukrainian SSR, Soviet Union
- Spouse: Rayisa Demchyshyn
- Education: Lviv University; Viadrina European University; University of Kansas

Volodymyr Vasylyovych Demchyshyn (Ukrainian: Володимир Васильович Демчишин; born 12 November 1974) is a Ukrainian former banker and politician, who served as Minister of Energy and Coal Industry of Ukraine from 2014 to 2016 in the second Yatsenyuk Government.

== Biography ==
=== Education ===
Demchyshyn graduated in International Economic Relations from the Lviv State University, and later went on to receive an MBA in international finance from the University of Kansas.

=== Banking career ===
After finishing his academic studies, Demchyshyn went on to work in the financial sector, having held multiple senior positions for several banks and financial institutions.

Between 2006 - 2008, Demchyshyn led the investment banking department at ING’s Ukrainian branch. During his time at ING, he met Ukrainian investment bankers Makar Paseniuk and Konstantin Stetsenko, with whom he later went on to establish the controversial investment firm Investment Capital Ukraine.

From 2008 - 2014, Demchyshyn was a partner at Investment Capital Ukraine and headed its investment banking department, under Paseniuk and Stetsenko.

=== Minister of Energy ===
In 2014, Demchyshyn was appointed as the Minister of Energy and Coal Industry of Ukraine. He served in the role until 2016.

His appointment caused media critics to raise concerns about a potential conflict of interest, as at the time he still held significant shares of Investment Capital Ukraine's business in Ukraine, including financial institutions like Avangard Bank, as well as Investment Capital Ukraine's holding companies.

== Controversies ==
=== The Rotterdam+ Scheme ===
In March 2016, towards the end of his tenure as Minister of Energy and Coal Industry, Demchyshyn announced the adoption of the Rotterdam+ formula, which will be used by the Ukrainian state to determine the steam coal’s price.

It was later revealed that the formula was put into motion by Dymchyshyn to boost the profitability of Ukrainian energy company DTEK, and increase returns for investment firm Investment Capital Ukraine, which had bought DTEK’s struggling bonds the year before. According to media reports, the profitability from the insider knowledge scheme has boosted Investment Capital Ukraine's assets under management to over $500 million.

=== The Coal Case ===
In 2021, the Ukrainian SBU and SBI notified Demchyshyn about an official investigation against him on suspicion of involvement with terrorist organizations, particularly in relation to agreements to supply coal to Russian forces. It was later reported that he had withdrawn from his positions in Investment Capital Ukraine's businesses days prior to the notification, in order to avoid further investigation into past business dealings similar to the Rotterdam+ scheme. In addition to withdrawing from his positions at Investment Capital Ukraine, Demchyshyn fled the country to avoid being prosecuted in Ukraine, and settled in Cyprus.

In January 2022, Demchyshyn was put on the international wanted list for his involvement in the coal case.

== Kidnapping attempt ==
In November 2025, it was reported that Demchyshyn was attacked in Cyprus by three unknown assailants who attempted to force him into a commercial vehicle. Demchyshyn, who was walking with his business partner and father, managed to escape the abduction attempt and fled the scene.

Political offices
| Preceded by Yuriy Prodan | Minister of Fuel and Energy of Ukraine; 2014– | Succeeded by Incumbent |
