= National Agency of Ukraine for Civil Service =

Civil service commission

National Agency of Ukraine on Civil Service
- Національне агентство України з питань державної служби

Agency overview
- Formed: 18 July 2011
- Preceding agency: Main Department of the State Service (1994-2011)
- Jurisdiction: Government of Ukraine
- Headquarters: Kyiv
- Employees: 141
- Agency executive: Natalia Alyushina, Head of the National Agency of Ukraine on Civil Service
- Website: www.nads.gov.ua

The National Agency of Ukraine on Civil Service (NAUCS) (Ukrainian: Національне агентство України з питань державної служби) - central authority of executive power, which ensures the formation and implementation of state policy in the field of civil service, provides functional management of public service in public authorities. Among the activities of the National Agency of Ukraine on Civil Service is the studying of the European experience in the field of civil service and the development of a proposal for the implementation of best international practices into the activities of the public authorities.

== Main functions ==
- Policy formulation and implementation
- Functional administration
- Methodological guidance of the HR units
- Control for implementation of legislation on civil service
- Adherence of unified requirements to candidates for civil service
- Training and professional development

== Mission of the NAUCS ==
- DEVELOPMENT of a professional, efficient, sustainable, politically impartial civil service that meets the principles of good governance, the standards and best practices of the EU Member States, the Organisation for Economic Co-operation and Development (OECD) countries
- ENSURING high-quality and effective functional management of the civil service in public authorities

== Key priorities of the civil service development ==
- Formation of the institutional capacity for the professional re-training of civil servants and the development of the top civil service
- Development of the integrated infrastructure of information system regarding the civil service HRMIS
- Introduction of the modern approaches to the HR management in the system of civil service
- Drafting legislation on civil service issues and preparation of its implementation
- Enhancement of the institutional capacity of the central executive agencies, needed for the adaptation of the national legislation to the EU standards
- Enhancement of the international cooperation in the area of civil service and public administration
- Improvement of the system and structure of the central executive agencies

== See also ==
- Center for Adaptation of Civil Service to the Standards of the European Union
- Higher School of Public Administration
- Richelieu forum
- Civil service
- Public administration
