= Ministry of Energy (Ukraine) =

Government ministry of Ukraine

- Міністерство енергетики України
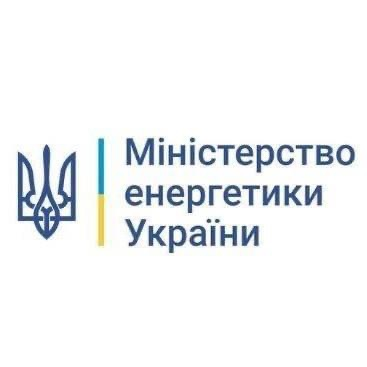
- Ministerial insignia

Agency overview
- Formed: 1971
- Jurisdiction: Government of Ukraine
- Headquarters: 30, Khreshchatyk st., Kyiv
- Agency executive: Denys Shmyhal, Minister of Energy
- Child agencies: Naftogaz Ukrainy; Energoatom; UkrEnergy; UkrIntEnergy
- Website: Official website

The Ministry of Energy is responsible for energy in Ukraine.

The government ministry was originally formed in the 1970s as the Ministry of Energy and Electrification.

== Functions ==
- state governance of the Fuel-Energy Complex
- ensuring the realization of state policies in the Fuel-Energy Complex
- ensuring energy security of the State
- participation in the formation, regulation, and improvement of the fuel-energy resource market
- developing proposals to improve economic incentives in stimulation of the Fuel-Energy Complex development

=== Vectors of specialization ===
- Power generation
- Nuclear power
- Oil and Gas industry
- Coal mining

== Fuel energy complex associations ==
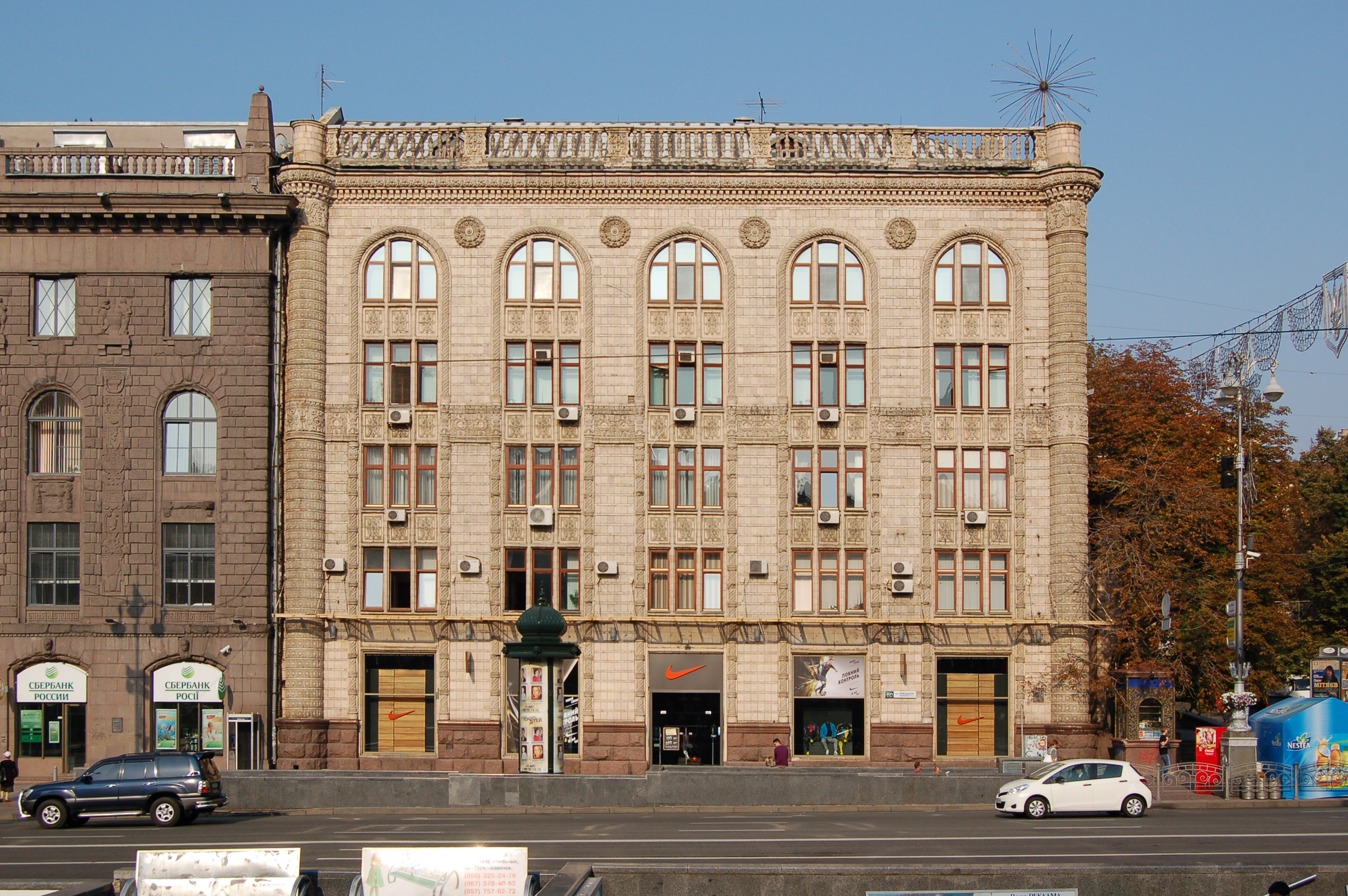
Headquarters of the Ministry in Kyiv

=== Power generation ===
- National Nuclear Power-generating Company Energoatom
  - Khmelnytskyi Nuclear Power Plant
  - Rivne Nuclear Power Plant
  - South Ukraine Nuclear Power Plant
  - Zaporizhzhia Nuclear Power Plant
  - Donuzlav WES (Wind Power Plant)
  - other supporting companies
- Sevastopol Institute of Nuclear Power an Industry
- State Research Company "Tsyrkoniy"
- Chornobyl Center on issues of Nuclear Security, Radioactive Waste and Radioecology
- Industrial Reserve-Investment Fund in Development of Energy
- Ukrenerhokomplekt
- Ukrainian Nuclear Association
- Ukrinterenergo
- State Enterprise National Power Company Ukrenerho
  - Derzhenerhonahlyad (State Energy Supervision)
  - Derzhinspektsia (State Inspection)
- Centrenergo
- Ukrhydroenergo (100%)
- Dniester Hydro-accumulating Power Station (87.4%)
- others

=== Oil/gas and oil refinery industries ===
- National Joint-Stock Company Naftogaz Ukrainy
  - Subsidiary Company Ukrgasproduction
  - Open Joint-Stock Company Ukrnafta (50% + 1)
  - Subsidiary Joint-Stock Company Chornomornaftogaz
  - Overseas branches
  - other enterprises

=== Small share participants ===
- Donbasenergo (25.0%)
- DTEK Dniproenergo (25.0%)

=== Former members ===
- State Special Enterprise Chernobyl Nuclear Power Plant was created on July 11, 2001 on base of the former Energoatom's company of the same name. The company was basically recommissioned under a special jurisdiction for the further decommissioning of its nuclear power station. On July 15, 2005 the enterprise was transferred from under the jurisdiction of the Ministry of Fuel and Energy to the Ministry of Emergencies.
- National Joint-Stock Company Energy Company of Ukraine

== History ==
Previous names:

- 1982–1997 Ministry of Energy and Electrification
- 1997–1999 Ministry of Energy
- 1999–2010 Ministry of Fuel and Energy
- 2010–2019 Ministry of Energy and Coal Mining
- 2019-2020 Ministry of Energy and Environmental Protection
- since 2020 Ministry of Energy

The ministry also absorbed a separate Ministry of Coal Mining which existed since 1954 until 1999 and was revived in 2005-2010.

The Ministry was (as it turned out) temporally merged the ministry with the Ministry of Ecology and Natural Resources by Honcharuk Government (on 29 August 2019). But the succeeding Shmyhal Government re-created the Ministry of Ecology and Natural Resources (on 27 May 2020).

== List of ministers ==
=== Energy and electrification ===
Prime Minister(s)	Name	Term of office	
Prime Minister(s)	Name	Start	End
	Oleksiy Makukhin	27 November 1971	11 May 1982
	Vitaliy Skliarov	11 May 1982	3 January 1993
	Anatoliy Hrytsenko	3 January 1993	17 August 1993
	Vilen Semeniuk	17 August 1993	3 July 1995
	Oleksiy Sheberstov	3 July 1995	13 June 1996
	(acting)	13 June 1996	1 July 1996
	Yuriy Bochkaryov	1 July 1996	6 May 1997
In 1997 it was replaced with Ministry of Energy

=== Energy ===
Prime Minister(s)	Name	Term of office	
Prime Minister(s)	Name	Start	End
In 1997 it was established in place of Ministry of Energy and Electrification
Pavlo Lazarenko	Yuriy Bochkaryov	1997	1997
Valeriy Pustovoitenko	Oleksiy Sheberstov	1997	1999
Valeriy Pustovoitenko	Ivan Plachkov	1999	1999

=== Fuel and energy ===
Prime Minister(s)	Name	Term of office	
Prime Minister(s)	Name	Start	End
In 1999 it was established in place of Ministry of Energy
Viktor Yushchenko	Serhiy Tulub	1999	2000
Viktor Yushchenko	Serhiy Yermilov	2000	2001
Viktor Yushchenko	Stanislav Stashevshkyi	2001	2001
Anatoliy Kinakh	Vitaliy Haiduk	2001	2002
Viktor Yanukovych	Serhiy Yermilov	2002	2004
Viktor Yanukovych	Serhiy Tulub	2004	2005
Yuriy Yekhanurov	Ivan Plachkov	September 2005	January 2006
Viktor Yanukovych	Yuriy Boiko	January 2006 (acting until August)	December 2007
Yulia Tymoshenko	Yuriy Prodan	December 2007	March 2010
Mykola Azarov	Yuriy Boiko	March 2010	December 2010
In 2010 Ministry of Fuel and Energy was liquidated and merged

=== Coal mining ===
Ministry of Coal Mining of Ukraine existed at least since 1954.

Prime Minister(s)	Name	Term of office	
Prime Minister(s)	Name	Start	End
no information		1987	1994
Vitaliy Masol	Viktor Poltavets	1994	1995
Yevhen Marchuk	Serhiy Polyakov	1995	1996
Pavlo Lazarenko	Yuriy Rusantsov	1996	1997
Valeriy Pustovoitenko	Stanislav Yanko	1997	1998
Valeriy Pustovoitenko	Serhiy Tulub	1998	1999
no information		1999	2005
Yuriy Yekhanurov	Viktor Topolov	2005	2006
Yuriy Yekhanurov	Serhiy Tulub	2006	2007
Yulia Tymoshenko	Viktor Poltavets	2007	2010
Mykola Azarov	Yuriy Yashchenko	2010	2010
In 2010 Ministry of Coal Mining was liquidated and merged

=== Energy and coal mining ===
Prime Minister(s)	Name	Term of office	
Prime Minister(s)	Name	Start	End
In 2010 Ministry of Fuel and Energy merged with Ministry of Coal Mining
Mykola Azarov	Yuriy Boiko	December 2010	24 December 2012
Mykola Azarov	Eduard Stavytsky	24 December 2012	27 February 2014
Arseniy Yatsenyuk	Yuriy Prodan	27 February 2014	2 December 2014
Arseniy Yatsenyuk	Volodymyr Demchyshyn	2 December 2014	14 April 2016
Volodymyr Groysman	Ihor Nasalyk	14 April 2016	29 August 2019
In 2020 Ministry of Energy and Coal Mining was liquidated and merged

=== Energy and environmental protection ===
Prime Minister(s)	Name	Term of office	
Prime Minister(s)	Name	Start	End
In 2019 ministry of Energy and Coal Mining merged with Ministry of Ecology and Natural Resources
Oleksiy Honcharuk	Oleksiy Orzhel	29 August 2019	4 March 2020
Denys Shmyhal	Vitaliy Shubin (acting minister)	11 March 2020	16 April 2020
Denys Shmyhal	Olha Buslavets (acting minister)	16 April 2020	27 May 2020

=== Energy ===
Prime Minister(s)	Name	Term of office	
Prime Minister(s)	Name	Start	End
In 2020 Ministry of Environmental Protection and Natural Resources split into a Ministry of Energy and a separate ministry for Environmental Protection
Denys Shmyhal	Olha Buslavets (acting minister)	27 May 2020	20 November 2020
Denys Shmyhal	Yuriy Boyko (acting minister)	20 November 2020	21 December 2020
Denys Shmyhal	Yuriy Vitrenko (acting minister)	21 December 2020	29 April 2021
Denys Shmyhal	Herman Halushchenko	29 April 2021	17 July 2025
Yulia Svyrydenko	Svitlana Hrynchuk	17 July 2025	19 November 2025
Yulia Svyrydenko	Artem Nekrasov (acting minister)	19 November 2025	14 January 2026
Yulia Svyrydenko	Denys Shmyhal	14 January 2026	

== See also ==
- Nuclear power in Ukraine
- Ministry of Emergencies (Ukraine)
- Ministry of Industrial Policy (Ukraine)
- DTEK
- List of power stations in Ukraine
