= Energy Company of Ukraine =

Ukrainian former state-owned energy company

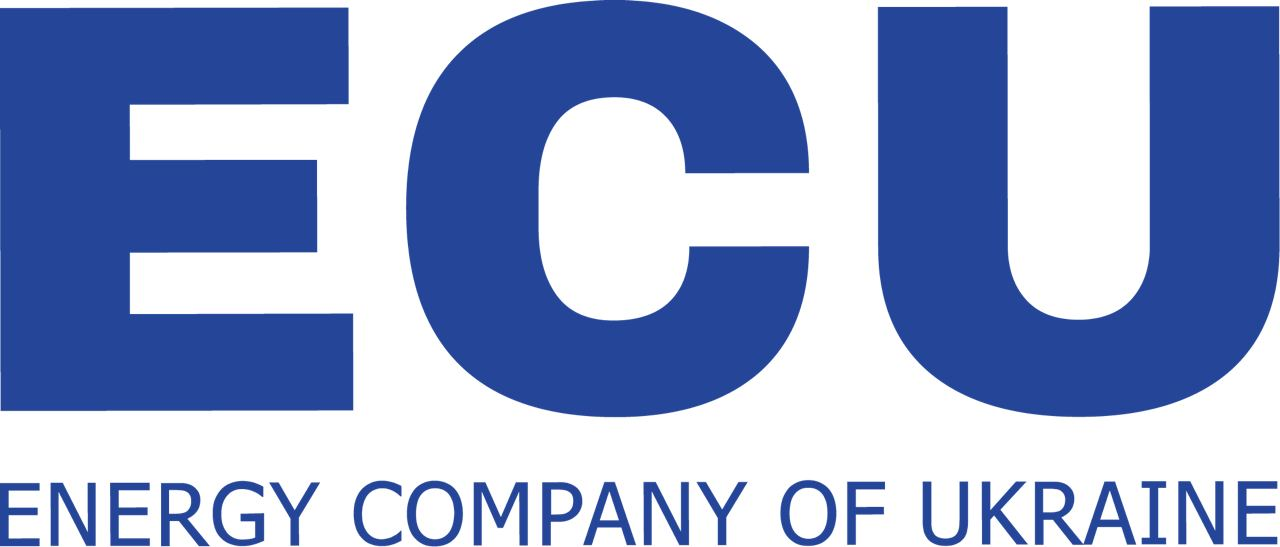
- English logo
- Native name: АТ «Енергетична компанія України»
- Type: State owned
- Industry: Energy
- Headquarters: Kyiv, Ukraine
- Area served: Ukraine
- Services: Electricity and natural gas supply, import and export of energy resources, balancing group services, green energy trading, energy security projects
- Owner: State of Ukraine
- Parent: State Property Fund of Ukraine
- Website: www.ecu.gov.ua

Energy Company of Ukraine (ECU) (Ukrainian: АТ "Енергетична компанія України", romanized: AT "Enerhetychna kompaniia Ukrainy") is a state-owned energy trading company that was registered on 22 June 2004. It started its commercial operations in 2022. The company operates under The State Property Fund of Ukraine.

== Operations ==
The company is focused at supply of the electricity to the strategic enterprises of Ukraine, both state-owned and private. Its portfolio of clients represent 10% of Ukraine GDP.

ECU is one of the largest importers of electricity from the European Union. In March 2024, the company doubled the volume of its electricity import to compensate the losses of Ukrainian power system caused by shelling of country's power facilities.

ECU is among TOP 3 green energy traders in Ukraine, having contracts with leading renewable energy producers.

The company is the founder of the first state balancing group of electricity market participants.

In January 2025, ECU has announced the new business stream for providing support in deploying and commercial operation of distributed generation for municipalities and businesses.

In February 2025, ECU and Oschadbank have signed a memorandum of cooperation aimed at streamlining procedures and improving lending conditions for new energy projects in Ukraine's regions.

== Corporate governance ==
In September 2024, the supervisory board of ECU was formed after the competitive selection. It members are: Managing Director of the consulting company Stratos Energy Consulting Peter Styles (Head of the Supervisory Board), a member of the board of the energy distribution company Yedas Grids (Turkey) Abdullah Koksal, a senior manager of the consulting company LCHM (Great Britain) Alexandre Mougel, Deputy Chairman of the State Property Fund Ihor Tymoshenko and Deputy Minister of Agrarian Policy of Ukraine Oksana Osmachko.

== Former subsidiaries ==
The company previously owned shares in various energy production and distribution companies, but between 2000 and 2014 most of them were sold within the privatization process.

== See also ==
- Energoatom
- Naftogaz Ukrainy
- List of power stations in Ukraine
