= Serhiy Tulub =

Ukrainian politician

Sehriy Tulub
- Сергій Тулуб
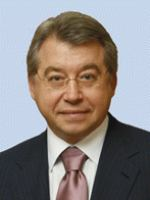

Governor of Cherkasy Oblast
- In office 6 April 2010 – 25 February 2014
- Preceded by: Petro Haman (acting)
- Succeeded by: Yuriy Tkachenko

Member of the Verkhovna Rada
- In office 23 November 2007 – 10 April 2010

Minister of Coal Industry of Ukraine
- In office 4 August 2006 – 18 December 2007
- Preceded by: Stanislav Yanko
- Succeeded by: Viktor Poltavets

Minister of Coal Industry of Ukraine
- In office 4 August 2006 – 18 December 2007
- Preceded by: Vikor Topolov
- Succeeded by: Viktor Poltavets

Minister of Fuel and Energy
- In office 5 March 2004 – 4 February 2005
- Preceded by: Serhiy Yermilov
- Succeeded by: Ivan Plachkov

Minister of Fuel and Energy
- In office 15 December 1999 – 13 July 2000
- Preceded by: Ivan Plachkov
- Succeeded by: Serhiy Yermilov

Minister of Coal Industry
- In office 3 June 1998 – 15 December 1999
- Preceded by: Stanislav Yanko
- Succeeded by: Vikor Topolov

Personal details
- Born: Serhiy Borysovych Tulub; 13 August 1953 (age 72) Donetsk, Ukrainian SSR, Soviet Union

Serhiy Tulub (Ukrainian: Сергій Борисович Тулуб; born 13 August 1953) is a Ukrainian politician who had served as the governor of Cherkassy Oblast from 2010 to 2014. He was the longest serving energy minister of Ukraine and was a member of the Verkovna Rada from 2006 to 2010.

== Early life ==
Tulub was born on 13 August 1953 in the city of Donetsk, which was thhen part of the Ukrainian SSR in the Soviet Union. After graduating from secondary school, he worked as an underground delivery-rigger at the Kirovska mine of the Donetsk Coal Plant. He then went back to school to receive higher education, and in 1976 graduated from the Donetsk Polytechnic Institute with a specialty as a mining engineer-economist. Afterwords, he worked as a shift supervisor at the "Kommunist" mine until 1983. From 1983 to 1986 he was chief engineer then director of the "Khartsyzka" mine.

From 1990 to 1997 he was director for capital construction of "Oktyabrvuhillia" in Khrestivka, then technical director and general director of "Shakhtarskvuhillia", and then general director of the state holding company "Shakhtarskantrotsyt" in Shakhtarsk.

== Political career ==
In 1981, he became an instructor for the industrial-transport department of the Khartsyzk City Committee, which he did until 1983. In 1986, he became First Secretary of the Khartsyzk City Committee, which he did until 1990. In 1997, he became Head of the Main Directorate of Coal Industry and Energy for the Donetsk Oblast Administration and was Deputy Governor of Donetsk Oblast under Viktor Yanukovych.

From 1998 to 2007 he variously he served as Minister of Energy. He also served as President of Energoatom from 2002 to 2004 and a People's Deputy of Ukraine in 2006 from the Party of Regions. Then, from 2010 to 2014, he was Governor of Cherkassy Oblast. During the events of Euromaidan, he submitted his resignation early in order "to avoid further confrontation" and because he understood the "inevitability and necessity of change", while emphasizing that he would remain a member of the Party of Regions. This occurred in the midst of prosecutors having notified Tulub that he was suspected of misappropriating government property.

After his resignation, he fled from Ukraine and was wanted for several months. He was later charged in the case for abuse of office, but he was removed from the international wanted lists by May 2014 and the case was closed. He reappeared in 2021, when he published an analytical article for the newspaper Holos Ukrainy, in which he refrained from criticizing the Volodymyr Zelenskyy's administration, but suggested audits and personnel changes and implied he was ready to return to the Ukrainian energy sector. His current whereabouts, however, are unknown as some claim he is in Ukraine and others suggest he is abroad.

== Personal life ==
He owns multiple properties in Marbella, Spain. He also allegedly owns a villa in Dubai.

== Honours ==
In 2024, Zelenskyy signed a degree enacting a decision to permanently strip many individuals, including Tulub himself, of all Ukrainian state awards for "committing unlawful acts against Ukraine", in addition to other sanctions that are placed on him for 10 years.

- Hero of Ukraine with the award of the Order of the State (August 6, 2004)
- Order of Prince Yaroslav the Wise, 5th class (August 13, 2013)
- Order of Merit, 3rd class (August 21, 1999)

== See also ==
- FC Cherkaskyi Dnipro
