= National Academy for Public Administration =

College in Kyiv, Ukraine

National Academy of State Administration
- Type: State education
- Established: 1995
- Rector: Yuriy Kovbasyuk
- Location: Kyiv, Ukraine
- Website: www.academy.gov.ua

The National Academy of State Administration (Ukrainian: Національна академія державного управління, romanized: Natsionalna akademiia derzhavnoho upravlinnia) of the President of Ukraine is the main state higher educational establishment in Ukraine for preparation and improvement of qualification of state service personnel and officials of local self-administration. It was founded in 1995 as the Ukrainian Academy of State Administration.

Subordinated to the State Management of Affairs.

Mission: formation of the modern managerial elite of Ukraine, development of professional competence of civil servants and local government officials, scientific support of public administration reforms.

== Schools ==
=== Central ===
- Institute of higher governing cadres
- Higher school of state administration
- Institute of qualification improvement of governing cadres
- Institute of state service and local government
- Institute of issues on state service and local government

=== Regional ===
- Lviv Regional Institute of State Administration
- Kharkiv Regional Institute of State Administration
- Odessa Regional Institute of State Administration
- Dnipro Regional Institute of State Administration

=== Supporting institutions ===
- Distance learning center

== History ==
The predecessor of the academy is the Higher Party School of the Communist Party of Ukraine that was established in 1946. It was initially quartered at the Stelmashenko Gymnasium building in Kyiv that was built in 1910. In 1986 for the school was built own functionalism-styled building in place of the NASU acclimatization garden. With the fall of the Soviet Union, property of the Communist Party was confiscated and the school's building was transferred under the administration of Kyiv University.

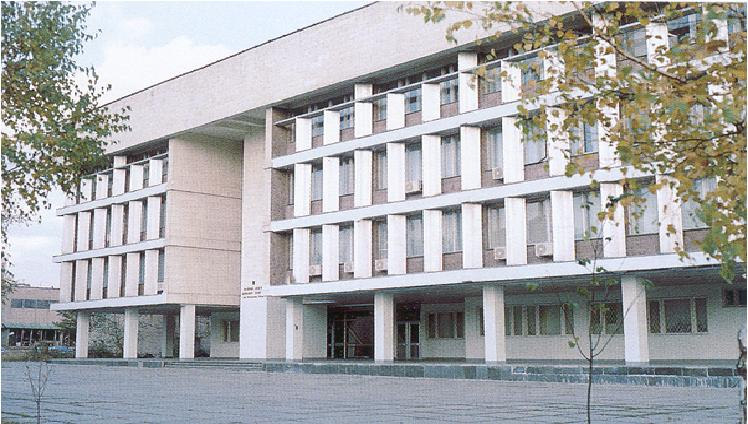
New building of the academy

In 1992 the former Higher Party School was converted into the Institute of State Administration and Self-administration of Cabinet of Ministers of Ukraine which in 1995 was replaced by the Ukrainian Academy of State Administration of President of Ukraine.

In 1996, regional divisions of the Ukrainian Academy of Public Administration under the President of Ukraine began operating in Dnipro, Lviv, Odesa, and Kharkiv, which in 2001 received the status of regional institutes. By the Decree of the President of Ukraine of August 21, 2003 № 869, taking into account the significant contribution to the development of public administration in Ukraine, as well as taking into account national and international recognition of its results, the Ukrainian Academy of Public Administration under the President of Ukraine was granted national status. Academy of Public Administration under the President of Ukraine.

On 5 November 2020 President Volodymyr Zelenskyy signed a decree on the transfer of the proprietorship of the National Academy of Public Administration from the State Tax Service of Ukraine to the Ministry of Education. This decision was made on the basis of an application by the Taras Shevchenko National University of Kyiv. The academy will be attached to it.

== Research activities ==
An important area of activity of the National Academy is its scientific component, which focuses on:

- development of the field of science "Public Administration";
- conducting basic and applied research on public administration and local self-government;
- scientific support of the educational process;
- providing expert-consulting, information-analytical, scientific-methodical services on the theory and practice of state formation;
- organization and development of international cooperation in scientific research in this field.

In order to scientifically support the process of training, retraining and advanced training of civil servants and local government officials during the years of the National Academy, scientists have published almost 600 monographs, more than 200 textbooks and more than 1,000 textbooks.

An important area of activity of the National Academy is the training of scientific and scientific-pedagogical staff of the highest qualification. To this end, the institution has established and operates graduate school, doctoral studies, six specialized scientific councils. In total, during their operation (as of January 1, 2013) 703 dissertations were defended, including 98 doctoral and 605 candidate dissertations. Today, the share of defended dissertations in the National Academy and its regional institutes in the total number of defended works is 59% (in particular, 54% - doctoral and 60% - candidate dissertations).
