= Government of Ukraine =

Coordinates: 50°26′52.0″N 30°32′1.4″E

Cabinet of Ministers

Overview
- Established: 28 June 1917 (originally); 18 April 1991 (current form)
- State: Ukraine
- Leader: Prime Minister
- Appointed by: Verkhovna Rada
- Main organ: Cabinet of Ministers
- Ministries: 17
- Responsible to: President and the Verkhovna Rada
- Headquarters: Government Building; Hrushevsky Street, Kyiv
- Website: kmu.gov.ua/en

The Cabinet of Ministers of Ukraine (Ukrainian: Кабінет Міністрів України, abbr. КабМін, romanized: Kabinet Ministriv Ukrainy, abbr. CabMin), commonly referred to as the Government of Ukraine (Ukrainian: Уряд України, romanized: Uriad Ukrainy), is the highest body of state executive power in Ukraine. As the Cabinet of Ministers of the Ukrainian SSR, it was formed on 18 April 1991, by the Law of Ukrainian SSR No.980-XII. Vitold Fokin was approved as the first Prime Minister of Ukraine.

The cabinet is a collegiate body consisting of the cabinet's "presidium" composed of the Prime Minister of Ukraine and their vice prime ministers as well as other ministers who participate and vote on sessions of the cabinet. The prime minister presides over the cabinet. Some vice prime ministers may be appointed as the first vice prime ministers. Unlike the Soviet period of the government when presidium was actually a functioning institution, the current government presidium is nominal and vice prime ministers do not have much advantage over other ministers. All government decisions are being voted for and adopted at the sessions of the cabinet by ministers only or heads of central offices of executive authority with ministerial status. The Secretariat of Cabinet of Ministers ensures the operations of the cabinet, while the National Agency of Ukraine for Civil Service provides human resources of government officials.

The basic unit of government administration in Ukraine is a central office of executive authority (central executive office) which may be granted ministerial status. Each such central office of executive authority is chaired by its head (holova). Many central offices of executive authority without ministerial status may be part of a government ministry, while others function separately or support either the President of Ukraine or the Verkhovna Rada (parliament). Central offices of executive authority without ministerial status are designated either as services, agencies, or inspections. Selected central offices of executive authority are granted a "special status". Only very few central executive offices are designated as funds, committees or otherwise.

The current Cabinet of Ministers of Ukraine is the Koretskyi Government that was formed on 16 July 2026, led by Serhii Koretskyi.

== Scope ==
The number of ministries in the cabinet has changed over time, some ministries were abolished, others combined with others or degraded to state committees or agencies. Each ministry is in charge of other government sub-departments. There are three basic types of government sub-departments known as "central offices (organs) of executive authority": services, agencies, inspections. Beside the basic government sub-departments there also other government sub-departments which were granted a special status. Among such sub-departments there are various government committees, government commissions, government funds, and other institutions. Sub-departments may be elevated to ministerial status by their reorganisation and, vice versa, government ministries may degraded to sub-departments (e.g. Ministry of Emergencies was degraded to a sub-department of the Ministry of Internal Affairs).

The Cabinet is responsible to the President of Ukraine and is under the control of, and is held accountable to, the Verkhovna Rada. The Cabinet consists of the Prime Minister, the First Vice-Prime Minister, three Vice-Prime Ministers, and other Ministers, who head their assigned Ministries (departments). At one time, there also was an institute of "state ministries", this institute being abolished on 25 February 1992 by the Presidential Decree (#98). The Secretariat of Cabinet of Ministers (or Minister of the Cabinet of Ministers) supports the effective operation of the government. Structural part of the secretariat is also the office of the Prime Minister of Ukraine.

=== Public relations ===
Parts of Cabinet meetings are broadcast live on Ukrainian TV.

Since August 2016, Ukrainians can sign and submit electronic petitions to the Cabinet of Ministers of Ukraine "to (assist with) the formation of the priorities of state policy and management decision-making". To be considered, the petition must get at least 25,000 votes three months from the date of publication.

=== Reforms and "optimizations" ===
According to Oleksandr Zapadynchuk, the process of establishing an administrative system in an already independent Ukraine started in the spring of 1991 when the Cabinet of Ministers of Ukraine (in place of the Council of Ministers of the Ukrainian SSR) was created, with new members of the government being appointed, as well as a new government office being formed. Until the adaptation of the Constitution of Ukraine in 1996, the government of Ukraine was ruled by the 1978 Constitution of Ukraine (the Ukrainian SSR). Also, the 1978 Constitution ruled that the President of Ukraine (an office created in 1991) is a head of state and a head of government (executive power) (Article 114-1). At the same time, the government headed by Prime Minister de facto remained independent and detached from the President, a state institution which had to function governed by its own programme.

== Duties and authority ==
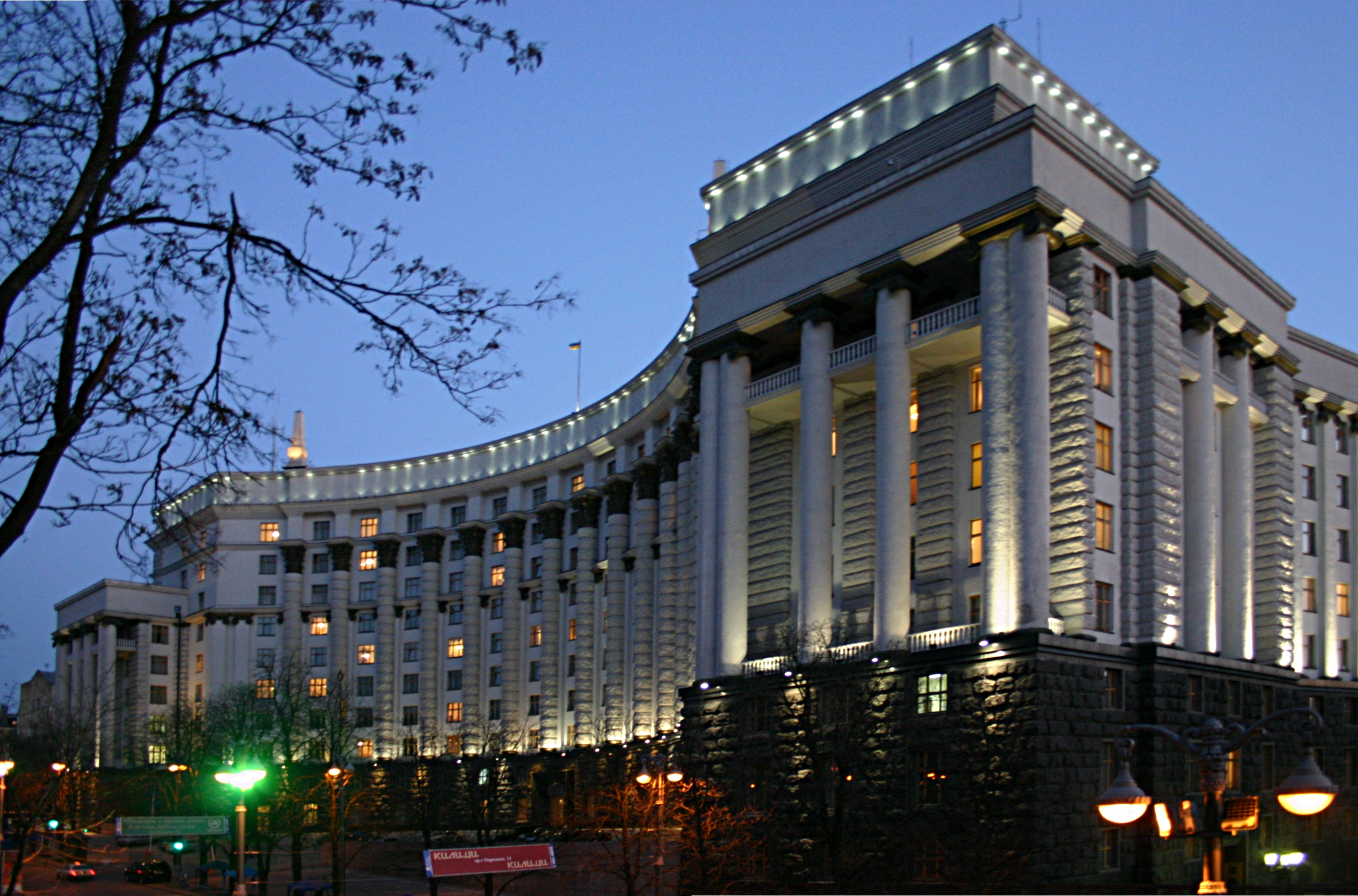
Government Building, 12/2, Hrushevsky Street, Kyiv

The duties of the Cabinet of Ministers are described in Article 116 of the Constitution of Ukraine. Members of the government (cabinet) are citizens of Ukraine, who have the right of vote, higher education, and possess the state language (Ukrainian). The members of the government cannot have judgement against them that has not been extinguished and taken away in the established legal order. Members of the Cabinet and chief officers of central and local bodies of executive power may not combine their official activity with other work, except teaching, scholarly and creative activity outside working hours, and/or to be members of an administrative body or board of supervisors of an enterprise that is aimed at making profit. In case if a People's Deputy of Ukraine was appointed to the Cabinet of Ministers of Ukraine they resign as a member of parliament and their letter of resignation is reviewed immediately at the next session of the Verkhovna Rada.

At the sessions of the Cabinet, the President of Ukraine or their designee may participate. During the plenary sessions of the Verkhovna Rada, the People's Deputies of Ukraine have the Time of questions to the Government during which the whole Cabinet participates and answers to all queries of members of the Verkhovna Rada.

=== Authority ===
The Cabinet issues resolutions and orders that are mandatory for execution. Normative legal acts of the Cabinet, ministries, and other central bodies of executive power are subject to registration. Failure to register invalidates the act. (see Article 117) The Cabinet also possesses the power of legislative initiative and may introduce its own bills to the Verkhovna Rada. The members of Cabinet and deputy ministers may be present at the sessions of the parliament and participate in discussions. Every year no later than 15 September the Cabinet submits a bill on the State Budget of Ukraine to the Verkhovna Rada.

The sessions of the Cabinet are considered plenipotentiary if more than a half of the Cabinet's members participate in them. In case if a minister cannot participate at the sessions they may be replaced by a deputy with a consultative capacity. On propositions of other members of the Cabinet a consultative capacity may be awarded to other participants who allowed at the sessions of the Cabinet. Over the sessions presides the Prime Minister of Ukraine, while in his(hers) absent – the First Vice Prime Minister.

The decisions of the Cabinet are adopted by the majority of the Cabinet's composition. In case of votes equality the vote of the Prime Minister is considered to be decisive.

Heads of regional government (including the Presidential representative of Ukraine in Crimea) are appointed by the President of Ukraine on the submission of the Cabinet of Ministers for the term of office of the Head of the State.

== Appointment and dismissal ==
The Verkhovna Rada has five days to approve the Prime Minister after the President proposes a candidate. A vote in Parliament is required to approve or dismiss any government minister. The President or one-third of members of parliament can initiate a vote of no confidence, but only once in a parliament session.

The entire Cabinet has to be dismissed following the Prime Minister's resignation. But a Cabinet's resignation cannot be considered within a year of the Cabinet's approval of its programme of activities, meaning a Cabinet dismissal can not done in its first year of existence.

The President can order the Cabinet to carry out its duties for up to 60 days until a new Cabinet begins to work.

The composition of Cabinet is determined by the Parliament of Ukraine on the petition of the Prime Minister (with exception of Minister of Defence and Minister of Foreign Affairs, which candidates are proposed by the President). The legislation on Labour and State Service do not cover regulations of Cabinet's members. Positions of Cabinet of Ministers are political and are regulated by the Constitution of Ukraine and the Law of Ukraine on the Cabinet of Ministers of Ukraine.

The Verkhovna Rada terminates the powers of members of parliament appointed to the Cabinet of Ministers.

=== 2004 constitutional amendments ===
The 2004 constitutional amendments are also erroneously known as the 2004 Constitution of Ukraine. The following amendments were procedurally adopted however as amendments rather than as constitution which requires a two-thirds majority approval from Parliament.

Under the terms of Article 83 of Ukraine's Constitution a governing coalition needs to be formed by factions (rather than by individuals) that represent a majority of the parliament, a "coalition of parliamentary factions" (Ukrainian: Коаліція парламентських партій). A February 2010 law on the parliament's regulations does demand both a decision by the factions and 226 signatures by members of parliament. On 1 October 2010, the Constitutional Court of Ukraine declared the constitutional amendments of 2004 illegal, thus abolishing the principle of coalition creation in the parliament. On 21 February 2014 the parliament passed a law that reinstated the 2004 amendments of the constitution. Three days later, they also terminated the powers of five judges of the Constitutional Court of Ukraine appointed from the parliament's quota, for violating their oath.

== Other central offices (agencies) of executive authority ==
=== Presidential state agencies ===
- Anti-Monopoly Committee
- State Property Fund
- State Committee for Television and Radio-broadcasting
- Administration of the State Special Communications Service
- National Agency on Corruption Prevention
- National Agency of Ukraine for Civil Service
- State Space Agency
- State Inspection of Nuclear Regulation
- State Regulatory Service

=== Separate central offices (agencies) of executive authority ===
- Central Election Commission
- National Council for Television and Radio-broadcasting
- Prosecutor General
- National Bank

=== National commissions (regulatory agencies) ===
- National Commission for State Regulation of Energy and Public Utilities
- National Commission for State Regulation of Communication and Informatization
- National Commission for State Regulation of Financial Services Markets
- National Commission on Securities and Stock Market

=== Advisory bodies ===
- Reform Delivery Office

== Government press media ==
- Uryadovy Kuryer (Government Courier)
- Ukrinform

== Previous (historic) executive assemblies ==
- Council of People's Commissars (1919–46), reestablished Bolshevik government
- Council of Ministers of the Ukrainian SSR (1946–91) (Law of the Ukrainian SSR "About the Council of Ministers of the Ukrainian SSR", 1978)
  - List of Ministries and State Committees in 1990 in accordance to the Declaration of state sovereignty

=== Alternative governments ===
- General Secretariat (1917–18), government established by the Central Council of Ukraine and approved by the government of the Russian Republic as its regional representation
- People's Secretariat (1917–18), government established by the Bolsheviks
- Council of People's Ministers (1918–21), independent government of Ukraine (Ukrainian People's Republic)

== See also ==
- Government ministries of Ukraine
