= National Commission for State Regulation of Energy and Public Utilities =

- Національна комісія, що здійснює державне регулювання у сферах енергетики та комунальних послуг
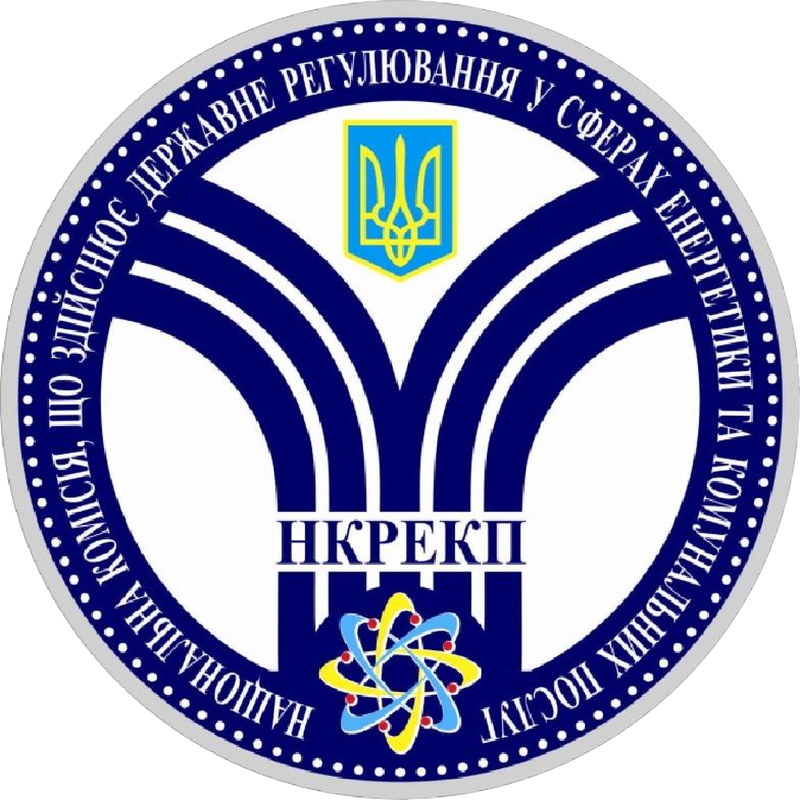

Agency overview
- Formed: August 27, 2014
- Preceding agencies: National Commission for State Regulation of Energy; National Commission for State Regulation of Public Utilities
- Jurisdiction: President of Ukraine
- Annual budget: ₴396.3 million (2018)
- Agency executive: Yurii Vlasenko, Head of the NCER
- Key document
- Website: http://www.nerc.gov.ua/

The National Commission for State Regulation of Energy and Public Utilities (Note: Ukrainian: Національна комісія, що здійснює державне регулювання у сферах енергетики та комунальних послуг, romanized: Natsionalna komiciia, shcho zdiisniuie derzhavne rehuliuvannia u sferakh enerhetyky ta komunalnykh posluh) (abbreviated as NKREKP (Note: Ukrainian: НКРЕКП) or NCREPU) is the state collegial body subordinated to the President of Ukraine and accountable to the Parliament of Ukraine. The commission was created by Presidential Decree No.715/2014 on 10 September 2014. The commission was created to combine the previously separate National Commission for State Regulation of Public Utilities and National Commission for State Regulation of Energy and Utilities.

According to the Decree of the President, the commission:

1. is involved in the formation and enforcement of a unified state policy in the sphere of functioning of electricity markets, natural gas, petroleum and petroleum products in the areas of heating, centralized water supply and drainage, treatment and disposal of household waste;
2. summarizes the practice of legislation on matters within its competence, submit to the established procedure proposals to improve legislation;
3. submit to the President of Ukraine, the Parliament of Ukraine an annual report on its activities and publishes it on its website;
4. is responsible for licensing of economic activities in the fields of electricity, heating, centralized water supply and drainage in the oil and gas sector in accordance with the applicable legislation;
5. approves different instructions, plans, conditions, algorithms and other documents for the execution of its tasks;
6. sets the prices (tariffs) for electricity, for the supply of natural gas and gas (methane) of coal deposits, other tariffs;
7. makes other actions in accordance with the Presidential Decree.
