= Shevchenko =

Shevchenko (Ukrainian: Шевчéнко [ʃeu̯ˈtʃɛnko]; alternative spellings Schevchenko, Ševčenko, Shevcenko, Szewczenko, Chevchenko) is a family name of Ukrainian origin. It is derived from the Ukrainian word shvets (Ukrainian: швець [ʃwɛtsʲ]; compare Czech: švec), literally meaning "cobbler or shoemaker", and the suffix -enko, denoting Ukrainian descent. It is somewhat equivalent to occupational surnames: French: Cordonnier, Italian: Crispino, Spanish: Zapatero, German: Schumacher, Schumann, Schubert, and English: Shoemaker, Shoesmith, also Laster.

== People ==
=== Shevchenko ===
- Alexander Shevchenko (disambiguation), multiple individuals
- Aleksandr Shevchenko (1883–1948), Ukrainian modernist painter and sculptor
- Aleksandra Shevchenko (1926–2000), Ukrainian scientist-zootechnician and milkmaid
- Alexandra Shevchenko (born 1988), Ukrainian feminist
- Anastasiia Shevchenko (born 1998), Russian para swimmer
- Andrey Anatolyevich Shevchenko, Russian politician
- Andriy Shevchenko (born 1976), Ukrainian football player and manager
- Andriy Shevchenko (politician) (born 1976), Ukrainian journalist and politician
- Anna Shevchenko (born 1993), Kazakhstani cross-country skier
- Antonina Shevchenko (born 1984), Kyrgyzstani/Peruvian martial artist
- Arkady Shevchenko (1930–1998), Ukrainian Soviet diplomat and defector
- Artem Shevchenko (born 1977), Ukrainian TV journalist and manager
- Christine Shevchenko (born 1988), Ukrainian-American ballet dancer
- Daryna Shevchenko (journalist)
- Denys Shevchenko (born 2003), Ukrainian footballer
- Dmitriy Shevchenko (disambiguation), multiple individuals
- Eduard Shevchenko (born 1977), Ukrainian soldier
- Igor Shevchenko (disambiguation), multiple individuals
- Ihor Shevchenko (born 1971), Ukrainian politician
- Inna Shevchenko (born 1990), Ukrainian feminist
- Irina Shevchenko (born 1975), Russian hurdler
- Kirill Shevchenko (born 2002), Ukrainian chess international master
- Leonid Shevchenko (1932–2017), Soviet and Russian footballer and football coach
- Lyudmyla Shevchenko (born 1970), Ukrainian team handball player
- Maksim Shevchenko (disambiguation), multiple individuals
- Mykyta Shevchenko (born 1993), Ukrainian football goalkeeper
- Oleksandr Shevchenko (disambiguation), multiple individuals
- Oleksiy Shevchenko (born 1992), Ukrainian footballer
- Olga Shevchenko (born 1979), Russian ski-orienteering competitor
- Serhiy Shevchenko (disambiguation), multiple individuals
- Serhiy Shevchenko (1908–200?), Ukrainian politician and diplomat
- Sofia Shevchenko (born 2001), Russian ice dancer
- Taras Shevchenko (1814–1861), Ukrainian poet and artist
- Valentina Shevchenko (born 1988), Kyrgyzstani-Peruvian mixed martial artist
- Valentyna Shevchenko (disambiguation), multiple individuals
- Vasyl Shevchenko (1888–1964), Ukrainian bandurist
- Vasilij Shevchenko (born 1960), Ukrainian astronomer
- Vitaliy Shevchenko (born 1951), Russian footballer
- Vitaly Shevchenko, BBC journalist
- Vladislav Shevchenko (born 1940), Russian astronomer
- Vyacheslav Shevchenko (born 1985), Ukrainian footballer
- Yegor Shevchenko (born 1978), Russian footballer
- Yelena Shevchenko (gymnast) (born 1971), Soviet artistic gymnast
- Yevhen Shevchenko (born 1987), Ukrainian footballer

=== Other forms ===
- Ihor Ševčenko (1922–2009), American philologist and historian
- Tanja Szewczenko (born 1977), German figure skater

== See also ==
- Neko Case (originally Shevchenko)
- Shevchuk, a Ukrainian cognate
- Shvets, a Ukrainian cognate
- Švec, a Czech cognate
- Szewczyk, a Polish cognate
