= Shevchik =

Shevchik or Shefchik may be an English-language respelling or transliteration of the following surnames of the same origin:

- Ševčík, from Czech and Slovak
- Szewczyk, from Polish

Shevchik or Shefchik may refer to:

- Byron Shefchik (born 1974), American swimmer
- Dan Shevchik (born 1980), American swimmer
- Rick Shefchik (born 1952), American writer

== See also ==
- Shevchuk
