= Igor Shevchenko (disambiguation) =

Igor Shevchenko (born 1985) is a Russian footballer.

Igor or Ihor Shevchenko may also refer to:

- Igor Shevchenko (lawyer), Russian from Ukraine and prosecutor of Sevastopol
- Ihor Shevchenko (born 1971), Ukrainian politician
- Ihor Ševčenko (1922–2009), Polish-born philologist and historian of Ukrainian origin

== See also ==
- Shevchenko
