= Public Anti-Corruption Council of the Ministry of Defense of Ukraine =

- Громадська антикорупційна рада при Міністерстві оборони України
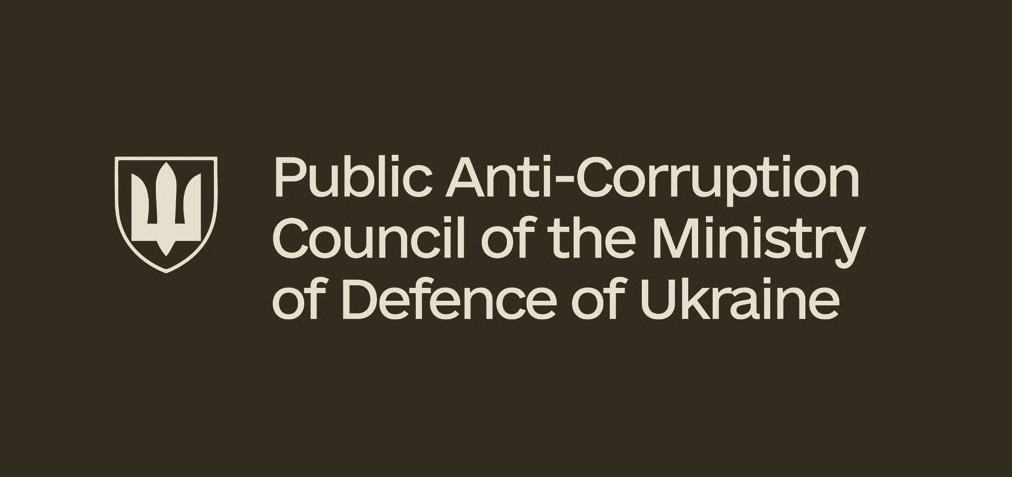

Agency overview
- Formed: 3 March 2023
- Jurisdiction: Ministry of Defence
- Agency executive: Yurii Hudymenko, Chairperson

The Public Anti-Corruption Council of the Ministry of Defense of Ukraine (PAC Council) (Ukrainian: Громадська антикорупційна рада при Міністерстві оборони України, ГАР МО)) is a permanent collegial consultative and advisory body under the Ministry of Defense of Ukraine. It was established to ensure public oversight, assess corruption risks in the Ministry's activities, develop proposals to eliminate such risks, and conduct anti-corruption monitoring. The current chairperson of the council is Yurii Hudymenko.

== History ==
The council was established on 3 March 2023 by Order No. 118/nm of the Ministry of Defense of Ukraine, “On the Approval of the Regulation on the Public Anti-Corruption Council under the Ministry of Defense of Ukraine.” Its creation responded to public demand for greater transparency in defense procurement following several high-profile corruption scandals in 2023. Amendments to the Regulation were introduced by Orders No. 465/nm (11 July 2024) and No. 727/nm (30 November 2024).

The second convocation of the council was formed in January 2025 based on the results of an open online vote.

== Mandate and functions ==
The council's key objectives include:

- Ensuring public participation in developing and implementing anti-corruption policies in the Ministry of Defense;
- Assessing corruption risks in agencies and enterprises within the Ministry's jurisdiction;
- Preparing recommendations to eliminate identified risks;
- Participating in drafting legal acts related to preventing corruption;
- Cooperating with Ukrainian law enforcement and anti-corruption institutions.

The council operates under a Regulation approved by the Minister of Defense, which defines its structure, procedures, and areas of competence.

== Composition ==
=== First Convocation (2023–2025) ===
In April 2023, the Public Anti-Corruption Council under the Ministry of Defense of Ukraine was established following a corruption scandal involving the Ministry's food procurement, widely known as the “egg procurement scandal.”

On 10 April 2023, the Ministry of Defense of Ukraine officially formed the Public Anti-Corruption Council, which included the following members:

1. Oleksandr Herashchenko — Center for Countering Raiding and Corruption;
2. Artak Hryhoryan — Automaidan All-Ukrainian Association;
3. Yevhen Hrushovets — Ukrainian Bar Association;
4. Vitalii Kalnytskyi — NGO Anti-Corruption Axe;
5. Hennadii Kryvosheia — Together Against Corruption;
6. Vitalii Masiuk — New Honest Ukraine;
7. Tetiana Nikolaienko — NGO Sororitas;
8. Vitalii Odzhykovskyi — Ukrainian Bar Association;
9. Dmytro Ostapenko — Ukrainian Bar Association;
10. Kostiantyn Piontkovskyi — Automaidan All-Ukrainian Association;
11. Viktor Prudkovskykh — NGO Anti-Corruption Axe;
12. Oleh Svirko — NGO Sororitas;
13. Olena Trehub — Independent Anti-Corruption Commission (NAKO);
14. Anastasiia Shuba — NGO Anti-Corruption Axe;
15. Bohdana Yarova — NGO Sororitas.

The first convocation of the Council operated from 2023 to January 2025. Its activities included the preparation of initial analytical reports, participation in oversight of defense procurement, and issuing public appeals to state oversight bodies.

=== Second Convocation (from 2025) ===
Appointed by Order No. 29/nm of the Ministry of Defense dated 20 January 2025.

Council Leadership:

- Chairperson: Yurii Hudymenko (D7 Foundation)
- Deputy Chairperson: Tetiana Nikolaienko (Independent Anti-Corruption Commission, NAKO)
- Secretary: Oleh Chernov (Ukrainian Law Association)

Members:

| Place | First and last name | Organization | Number of votes |
| 1 | Yurii Hudymenko | D7 Foundation (formerly “Veteran’s Axe”) | 65222 |
| 2 | Tetiana Nikolaienko | Independent Anti-Corruption Commission (NAKO) | 43515 |
| 3 | Anastasiia Shuba | NGO Anti-Corruption Axe | 40281 |
| 4 | Mykyta Soloviov | NGO Anti-Corruption Axe | 39860 |
| 5 | Mykyta Shtankov | D7 Foundation | 39724 |
| 6 | Oresta Brit | BON | 39285 |
| 7 | Olena Nyshporka | NGO Anti-Corruption Axe | 39231 |
| 8 | Oleh Chernov | Ukrainian Law Association | 37829 |
| 9 | Maksym Kostetskyi | Independent Anti-Corruption Commission (NAKO) | 37683 |
| 10 | Viktor Bishchuk | Ukrainian Law Association | 37612 |
| 11 | Olena Trehub | Independent Anti-Corruption Commission (NAKO) | 37480 |
| 12 | Kateryna Datsenko | Civil Oversight Center | 34635 |
| 13 | Anton Mykytiuk | Civil Oversight Center | 33454 |
| 14 | Vitalii Masiuk | Ukrainian Law Association | 32948 |
| 15 | Viktor Prudkovskykh | Civil Oversight Center | 32136 |

== Activities ==
- Investigation of the Pavlohrad Chemical Plant:

The Council submitted official appeals to law enforcement agencies requesting an investigation into ammunition supplies and the activities of the plant's director, Leonid Shyman. Following these appeals, Shyman and several officials were detained. According to Chairperson Yurii Hudymenko, the case remains ongoing and aims to identify all individuals involved in the corruption scheme.

- Ammunition Procurement Oversight:

In 2024–2025, the Council investigated cases of defective 120-mm mortar shells and reported instances of official negligence within the Defense Procurement Agency.

- Inspection of Body Armor and Equipment:

Council members took part in evaluating state orders for body armor and other military equipment to ensure compliance with technical specifications.

- Fire Point Case and The New York Times Publication:

In October 2025, the Council refuted information published by The New York Times journalist Andrew Kramer, which incorrectly stated that the council had appealed to parliament regarding the drone manufacturer Fire Point. Following an official letter from Iurii Gudymenko, The New York Times issued a correction.

- “Milicon UA” and Body Armor Tender:

The Council released a statement asserting that a company linked to Tymur Mindich won a tender for supplying body armor despite lacking prior experience in defense manufacturing. The products were rejected by the military due to poor quality, and several officials of the Defense Procurement Agency were accused of lobbying the contract.

- Defence City Legislative Initiative:

The Council publicly criticized the first version of draft laws Nos. 13420–13423, warning that they created risks of manual control over defense procurement and de facto amnesty for violations by defense officials. After public pressure, an alternative draft law (No. 13423-2) was introduced without these provisions. The updated version is currently under review by NATO and G7 experts.

- Opposition to Agency Merger:

In October 2025, the Council opposed the Ministry's plan to merge the Defense Procurement Agency (AOZ) and the Defense Property Agency (DOT), arguing that this would increase corruption risks and reduce transparency. NATO experts later expressed solidarity with the council's position.

== Reports ==
In the first half of 2025, the second convocation of the Council presented its public report highlighting:

- Identification of problematic defense procurements;
- Initiation of internal investigations into ammunition quality;
- Oversight of the Defense Procurement Agency;
- Monitoring of food and equipment supply chains;
- Launch of a hotline for reporting corruption;
- Estimated prevention of budget losses worth ₴250–300 million.

== Scandals and Public Resonance ==
The council's creation was partly a reaction to public outrage over corruption in food procurement in early 2023 (known as the “eggs at ₴17 each” scandal), which served as a catalyst for greater public oversight in the defense sector.

In 2025, its response to The New York Times article on Ukrainian defense companies sparked discussion about the balance between transparency and the risks of information attacks.

== Hotline ==
In July 2025, the council launched a hotline for corruption reports — +380 93 333 80 08. The line is coordinated by the council's secretariat and allows servicemembers, defense industry employees, and citizens to report abuses in defense procurement.
