= Hudymenko =

Hudymenko (Ukrainian: Гудименко), also transliterated Gudymenko, is a Ukrainian surname. Notable people with the surname include:

- Yurii Hudymenko (born 1987), Ukrainian politician
- Yuriy Hudymenko (born 1966), Ukrainian footballer
