= Dmytro Tyshlek =

Ukrainian pro-Russian police officer

- Ukrainian: Дмитро Петрович Тишлек

Deputy Chief of the National Police of Ukraine
- Incumbent
- Assumed office September 2023

Personal details
- Born: Donetsk, Ukrainian SSR, Soviet Union (now Ukraine)
- Spouse: (Russia) Oleksandra Balakai
- Police career
- Department: National Police of Ukraine
- Service years: 2006–present
- Status: Active duty

Dmytro Tyshlek (Ukrainian: Дмитро Петрович Тишлек) is a Ukrainian pro-Russian police officer. He is the Deputy Chief of the National Police of Ukraine.

He is married to a Russian citizen, Oleksandra Balakai, and she and her mother have visited the Russian-occupied Crimea.

He is the subject of a Bihus.Info investigation, according to which Tyshlek's wife has not yet renounced her Russian citizenship, and he himself has ties to the Russian mafia. On 28 October 2023, he was suspended from his duties until the investigation was completed.

== Early life ==
Dmytro Tyshlek was born in Donetsk.

He started working in the internal affairs agencies in July 2006 as an investigator, operative of the Budyonnovsky District Department of the Donetsk City Department of the Ministry of Internal Affairs of Ukraine in Donetsk Oblast. Until November 2013, he worked in the internal affairs bodies in Donetsk.

== Career ==
From November 2013 to April 2014 and from January 2015 to November 2015, he worked as Deputy Head of the Division of the Department of the State Service for Combating Economic Crime of the Ministry of Internal Affairs of Ukraine.

From April 2014 to January 2015 — Deputy Head of the Department of the Main Directorate of the Ministry of Internal Affairs of Ukraine in Donetsk Oblast.

From November 2015 to October 2019 — Head of the department, Head of the Division of the Department of Economic Protection of the National Police of Ukraine.

From October 2019 to September 2023 — Head of the Department of Strategic Investigations of the National Police of Ukraine.

Since 10 September 2023, he has been the Deputy Chief of the National Police of Ukraine. On 28 October 2023, he was suspended from duty.

=== Accusations of covering up fraudulent call centres ===
In June 2023, the Joker Telegram channel publicly accused Dmytro Tyshlek and other National Police officials of covering up fraudulent “investment offices” in Dnipro and Kyiv. According to the source, the Dnipro call centres are allegedly run by the city's head of the State Intelligence Service, Andrii Danyliuk, under the supervision of his immediate boss, acting First Deputy Head of the National Police of Ukraine, Dmytro Tyshlek.

== Investigations ==
On 26 October 2023, Bihus.Info published a journalistic investigation about Dmytro Tyshlek. The investigation states that Tyshlek uses the real estate and car of the family of the partner of a Russian mafia, and his wife still has Russian citizenship.

=== Relatives with Russian passports ===
According to the investigation, Dmytro Tyshlek's wife, Oleksandra Balakai, is a Russian citizen. In addition to Tyshlek's wife and mother-in-law, his other relatives on his wife's side also have Russian citizenship. The journalists learned that her family moved from Donetsk Oblast to Rostov Oblast in the 2000s and received Russian passports.

Later, Tyshlek's wife Oleksandra returned to Ukraine, but, as Bihus.Info clarifies, she did not renounce her Russian citizenship either in 2014, when the Russian-Ukrainian war began, or in 2022 after the start of the full-scale Russian invasion of Ukraine.

The investigation also refers to the mother of Tyshlek's wife. According to the authors of the investigation, she regularly visited her daughter's family in Ukraine. In 2018, she registered an elite property in the centre of Kyiv, which she later transferred to her daughter, the wife of Tyshlek's deputy chairman. After checking her social media, journalists also found evidence of her visits to the occupied Crimea and subscriptions to Russian propaganda resources.

The investigators found information on a Russian passport validation service that the passports of the deputy head of the National Police's wife and mother-in-law were valid as of June 2023. According to a document obtained by Censor.net, in 2005, Oleksandra Balakai applied to the Russian authorities to replace her passport as a Russian citizen. In addition, in 2015–2017, she regularly travelled to Russia and the Russian-occupied Crimea.

=== Ties to the Russian mafia ===
In September–October 2023, Tyshlek was repeatedly spotted in one of the elite cottage towns near Kyiv. According to journalists, he is currently living in one of the houses of Natalia Nechyporenko. And last spring, Tyshlek travelled abroad in the car of Vitaliy Nechyporenko, the husband of Natalia, in whose house he now lives.

The Nechyporenko's couple have a joint business with Andrian Rodin (aka Andrei Imanali, aka “Poluzver”). According to journalists, he is a Russian thief in law, one of the leaders of the Rostov-based Selmash organized crime group, who “has a very long and very complicated relationship with the police,” as Bihus.Info notes.

In 2019, the head of the Criminal Police of Ukraine, Vyacheslav Abroskin, said that Poluzverya was found in Kyiv at a meeting in a restaurant in the capital. At the time, Abroskin also promised to expel Imanali from the country, but instead deleted his post about it from Facebook. At the time, Abroskin promised to expel Imanali from the country, but for some reason deleted his post about it from Facebook. In 2021, before the National Security and Defence Council of Ukraine approved sanctions against more than five hundred people in the criminal world, the media published a preliminary list, which included Imanali's name among others. However, when the final version was published on the President's website, Imanali was no longer there. Journalists of Bihus.Info note that this list was one of the few prepared by the Ministry of Internal Affairs of Ukraine, in whose structures Tyshlek has worked all his life.

== Criminal prosecution ==
On 28 October 2023, the Minister of Internal Affairs of Ukraine, Ihor Klymenko, announced that Dmytro Tyshlek had been suspended from his duties as Deputy Head of the National Police of Ukraine for the duration of the criminal investigation, which was initiated at his request following a journalistic investigation.

After the journalistic investigation was published, Dmytro Tyshlek publicly appealed to the SBI to verify the information published. The criminal proceedings are already underway. I am personally looking forward to the results. And society also needs to hear answers to questions. Because doubts about loyalty to the state and the oath are unacceptable. Especially in times of war. I can assure you that if the facts reported in the media are confirmed, urgent and tough management decisions will be made in relation to Dmitry Tyshlek. He will be suspended from his duties until the investigation findings are received.

— Ihor Klymenko

== Criticism ==
According to journalist and editor-in-chief of Censor.net Yuriy Butusov, the head of the Presidential Office, Andriy Yermak, and his deputy, Oleh Tatarov, are protecting the deputy head of the National Police, Dmytro Tyshlek, who is linked to the Russian mafia, from dismissal, while Volodymyr Zelenskyy does not want to be held accountable for the shameful appointment and delay in his dismissal.

Yurii Hudymenko, a participant in the Russo-Ukrainian War and head of the Ukrainian Association “Mriya”, believes that the case of Deputy Head of the National Police Dmytro Tyshlek is being hushed up and has sent an appeal to anti-corruption authorities to conduct an investigation.

On 21 November 2023, the National Agency for the Prevention of Corruption was monitoring Dmytro Tyshlek's lifestyle. It is also checking compliance with legislation on the prevention and settlement of conflicts of interest. This is stated in the response of the head of the department for lifestyle monitoring and control over the completeness of the declaration of Dmytro Sokolov to veteran Yurii Hudymenko.
