= Ševčík =

Ševčík (feminine Ševčíková) is a Czech and Slovak occupational surname, derived from the profession of Švec, "shoemaker". It is related to the Polish name Szewczyk. Notable people include:

- Adam Ševčík (born 1993), Czech footballer
- František Ševčík (1942–2017), Czech ice hockey player
- Ján Ševčík (1896–1965), Slovak politician
- Jaroslav Ševčík (born 1965), Czech ice hockey player
- John Sevcik (born 1942), American baseball player
- Joseph G. Sevcik (1916–1977), American lawyer and politician
- Julius Ševčík (born 1978), Czech director
- Michal Ševčík (born 2002), Czech footballer
- Otakar Ševčík (1852–1934), Czech violinist
- Petr Ševčík (born 1994), Czech footballer
- Petra Ševčíková (born 2000), Czech racing cyclist

== See also ==
- A namesake of the Randles–Sevcik equation
- A plaintiff in Sevcik v. Sandoval, a U.S. lawsuit
- Dan Shevchik, American competitive swimmer
- Byron Shefchik, American competitive swimmer
- Rick Shefchik, American journalist and author
