= Democratic Axe =

Democratychna Sokyra Демократична сокира
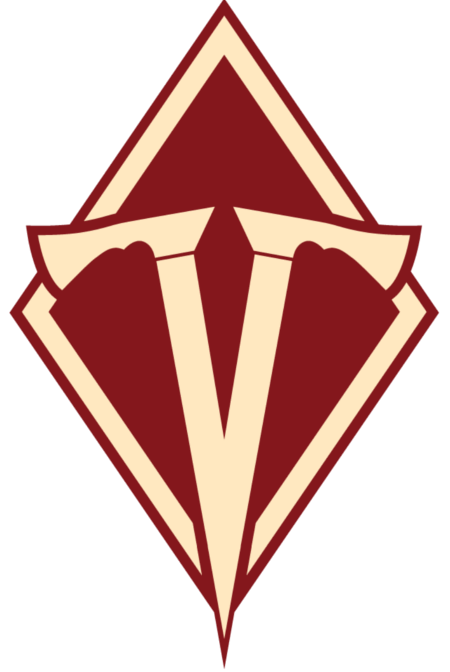
- Leader: Ihor Shchedrin
- Founder: Ihor Shchedrin; Iurii Hudymenko; Alex Noinets; Anton Shvets; Viktor Tregubov
- Founded: 2018
- Registered: 22 May 2019
- Headquarters: Kyiv, Ukraine
- Ideology: National liberalism Classical liberalism Pro-Europeanism
- Colors: Carmine; Peach
- Verkhovna Rada: 0 / 450
- Regions: 1 / 43,122

Website
- sokyra.party/en

Democratychna Sokyra (Ukrainian: Демократична Сокира, romanized: Demokratychna Sokyra or D7) is a Ukrainian political party and non-governmental organization founded in 2018 and officially registered at the Ministry of Justice on 22 May 2019.

== History ==
=== Founding ===
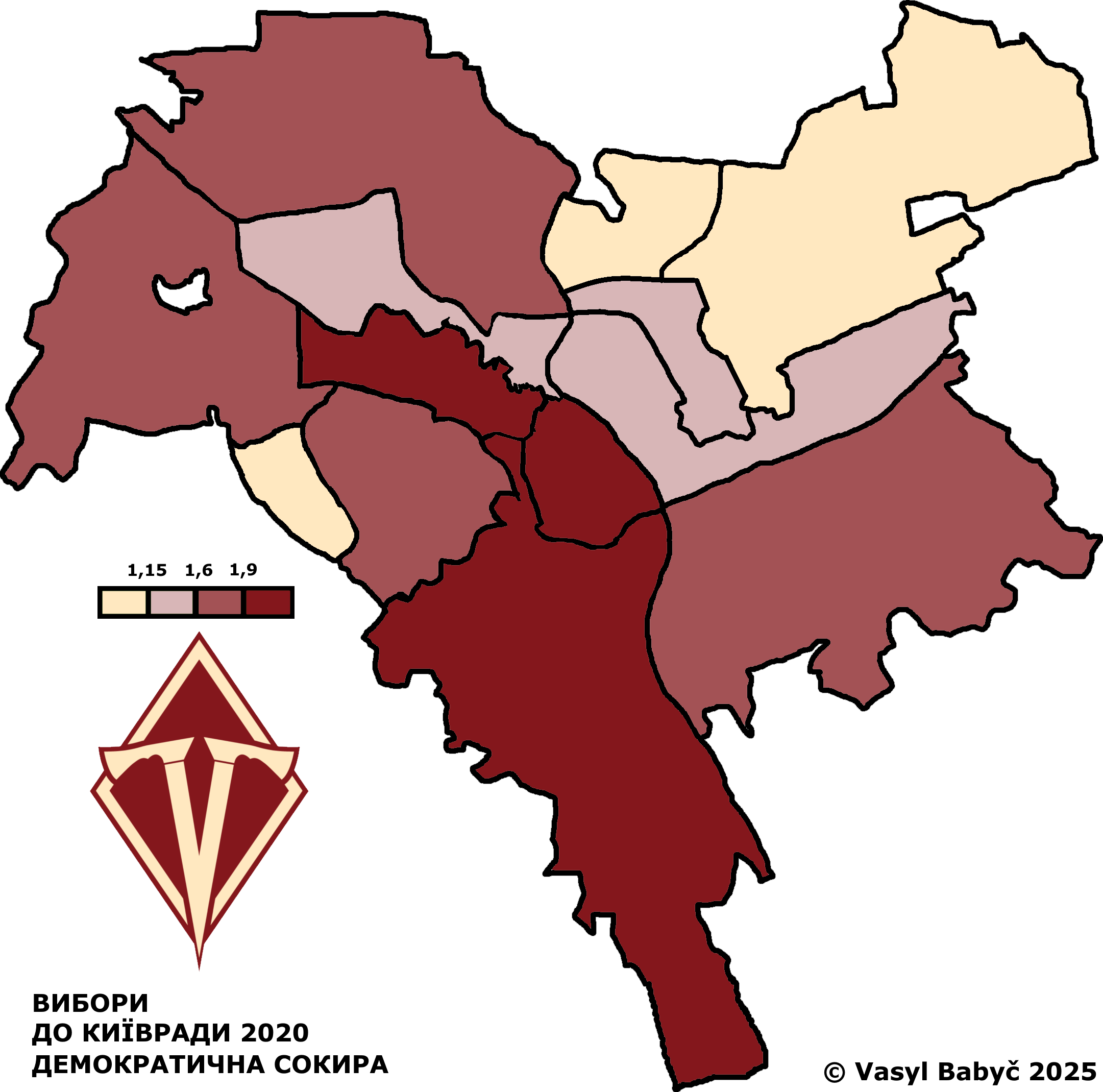
The results of the "Democratic Axe" party in the local elections in Kyiv on October 25, 2020 by districts.

The "Democratic Horde" party was announced at the end of April 2018. About 30 well-known bloggers (Iurii Gudymenko, Ihor Bihdan), journalists (Viktor Tregubov, editor-in-chief of the site "Peter and Mazepa"), Mykhailo Makaruk (volunteer of Narodny Tyl and the Inform Napalm community), businessmen (Bohdana Yarova, Pylyp Dukhlii), hackers (people known by the nicknames "Sean Townsend" and "Jeoffrey Dahmer" from the "Ukrainian Cyber Alliance"), ATO veterans (Oleksandr Zolotko, Anton Kolumbet), volunteers ("Serg Marco", Yaroslav Matiushyn), programmers and writers made statements about joining or supporting the party.

In the summer of 2018, the party was renamed from the "Democratic Horde" to the "Democratic Axe". The founders explained it with negative connotations that evoked the word "horde" in the name.

On August 4, 2018, the constituent assembly of the party was held at the Svii v dosku (Ukrainian: Свій в доску) pub, which was attended by 400 people. On December 27, 2018, documents were submitted to the Ministry of Justice of Ukraine for official registration of the party.

Officially added to the register of political parties by the Ministry of Justice on May 22, 2019.

=== 2019 parliamentary election ===
On May 15, 2019, the political parties "Strength of People", "Ukrainian Galician Party" and "Democratic Axe" became partners to coordinate their work to "resist the Russian revanchism" and advance democratic reforms.

On June 13, 2019, the CEC registered 10 candidates in single-mandate constituencies. None of the candidates were successful, Anton Kolumbet and Mykyta Soloviov achieved the highest results, 4.3% and 3.4% respectively.

== Ideology ==
The party stands for "the land market, the liberalization of gun laws, the consistent decriminalization of light drugs, the legalization of casinos and prostitution, LGBT marriages and all other initiatives aimed at maximizing the release of a responsible citizen from the dictatorship of the socialist state." The Party considers the minimization of the state's influence on the life of citizens as a cornerstone of ideology, so its general program and sectoral annexes are derived from this ideology - the abolition of the moratorium on land sales, total privatization, maximum deregulation.

== Advocacy activities ==
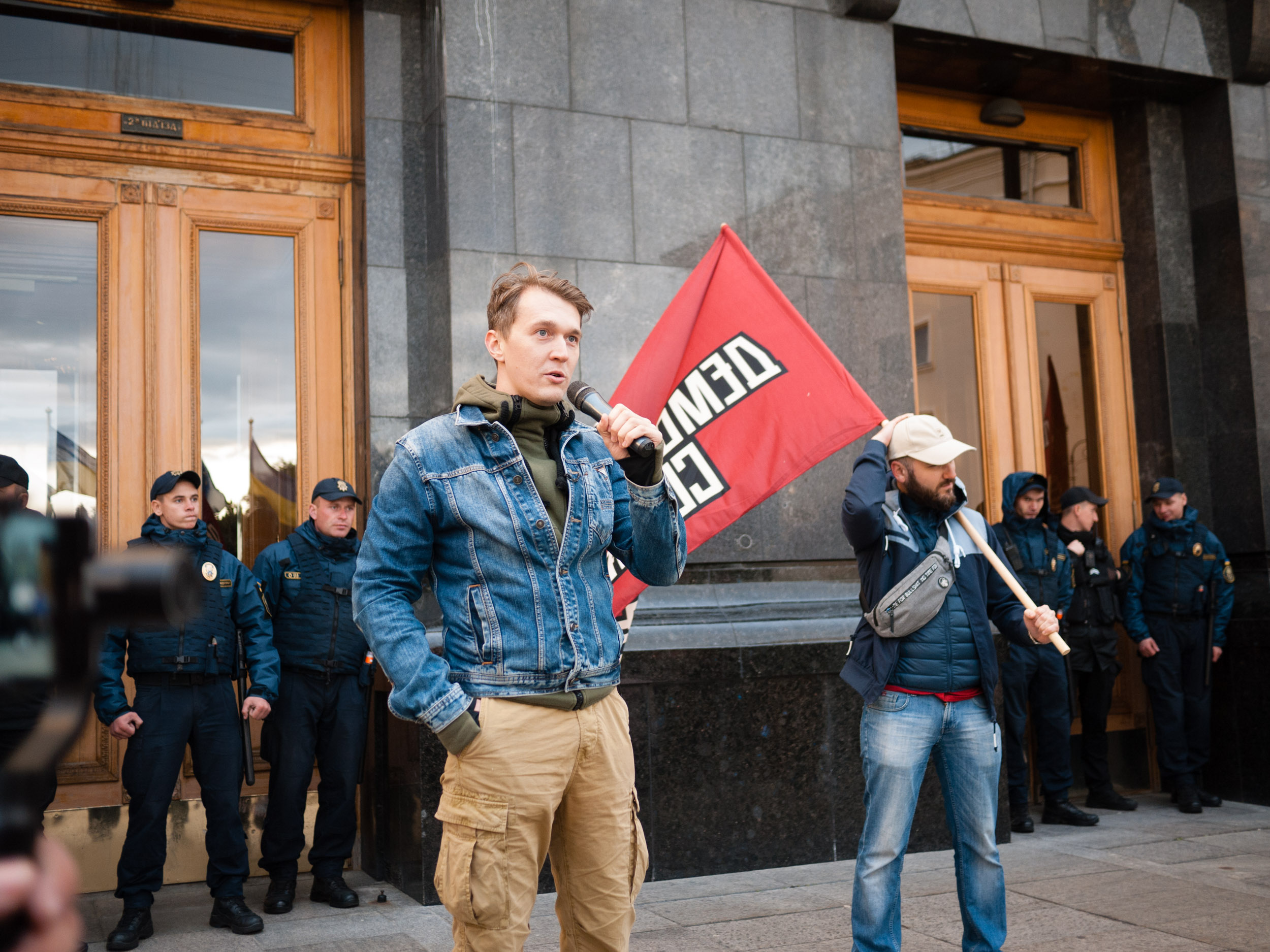
Iurii Gudymenko during the action "Impeachment of Kolomoisky" near President Office, Kyiv, September 20, 2019

Even before registration, the party launched a campaign to support the draft law on replacement of corporate tax with the tax on withdrawn capital. The party also held a flash mob to block draft law 6688, which significantly restricted internet freedom and providers' rights.

Through campaigning in the media, social networks and street campaigns, the party has delayed the adoption of the Natural gas transmission system law code by National Commission for State Regulation of Energy and Public Utilities for two months. According to the Democratic Axe leadership, the amendments to this code enabled the regional gas companies connected with Dmytro Firtash to carry out unauthorized gas extraction from the GTS without any consequences for themselves.

On June 6, 2018, three representatives of the "Democratic Axe Horde" NGO created by the party — Maksym Dizhechko, Tetiana Lokatska and Anatolii Mazur — garnered the highest number of votes during the elections to the Public Control Council of National Anti-Corruption Bureau and became part of it.

In the 2019 elections to the National Anti-Corruption Bureau Public Control Council, NGOs, close to Democratic Axe, formed a coalition with the "Veterans Movement of Ukraine" and won 14 out of 15 seats.

== Structure and leadership ==
From its inception, the Democratic Axe has positioned itself as a party without a charismatic leader. All important decisions are made by voting among party members.

Party chairman: Ihor Shchedrin
The political council of the party: Iurii Gudymenko, Anton Shvets, Viktor Tregubov, Keira Harmashova, Yelisey Khodolovsky, Taras Kotov, Bohdana Levytska, Mark Savchuk, Mykhailo Hrechuhkhin, Tetyana Komlyk, Mykyta Solovyov, Dmytro Shamray, Artem Zhuk, Ihor Shchedyn

== Party funding ==
According to the founders, crowdfunding is one of the main sources of funding for the party. The party regularly publishes expense and income statements.
