= Shevchuk =

Shevchuk, Shewchuk, Schewtschuk, Ševčuk, Sevcuk, Szewczuk, or Chevtchouk (Ukrainian: Шевчук) is a widespread Ukrainian surname. It is derived from the Ukrainian word shvets (Ukrainian: швець), "cobbler/shoemaker", and the suffix -uk, denoting descent. It is also related to Shevchyk (Ukrainian: Шевчик), a less common Ukrainian surname. The Polish version of the surname is "Szewczuk" and is used by Poles, which is also related to the Polish surname "Szewczyk".

== People ==
=== Shevchuk ===
- Anatoliy Shevchuk (1954–2011), Ukrainian art historian
- Andrey Shevchuk (born 1970), Russian javelin thrower
- Andriy Shevchuk (born 1985), Ukrainian footballer
- Anton Shevchuk (born 1990), Ukrainian footballer
- Anzhelika Shevchuk (born 1969), Ukrainian sprinter
- Serhiy Shevchuk (born 1985), Ukrainian footballer
- Serhiy Shevchuk (born 1990), Ukrainian footballer
- Stephan Shevchuk (born 1977), Russian sprint canoer
- Sviatoslav Shevchuk (born 1970), Ukrainian archbishop
- Taras Shevchuk (born 1997), Ukrainian track cyclist
- Vadym Shevchuk (born 1995), Ukrainian footballer
- Valeriy Shevchuk (1939–2025), Ukrainian writer
- Vasyl Shevchuk (born 1954), Ukrainian politician
- Vladimir Shevchuk (born 1954), Russian footballer and manager
- Vyacheslav Shevchuk (born 1979), Ukrainian footballer
- Yulia Shevchuk (born 1998), Ukrainian footballer
- Yuri Shevchuk (born 1957), Russian musician
- Yuriy Shevchuk (born 1985), Ukrainian footballer
- Yevgeny Shevchuk (born 1968), Transnistria politician

=== Shewchuk ===
- Daniel Shewchuk, Canadian politician
- Jack Shewchuk (1917–1989), Canadian hockey player
- Jamie Shewchuk (born 1985), Canadian lacrosse player
- Jonathan Shewchuk, Canadian computer scientist
- Murphy O. Shewchuk, Canadian writer
- Tammy Shewchuk-Dryden (born 1977), Canadian ice hockey player

=== Szewczuk ===
- Mirko Szewczuk (1919–1957), German cartoonist of Austrian-Ukrainian origin
- Stephen Szewczuk, Ukrainian-American army veteran
- Tomasz Szewczuk (born 1978), Polish footballer

== Related surnames ==
- Shevchenko
- Shvets
- Szewczyk
