= Ihor Shevchenko =

Ukrainian lawyer

- Ігор Шевченко
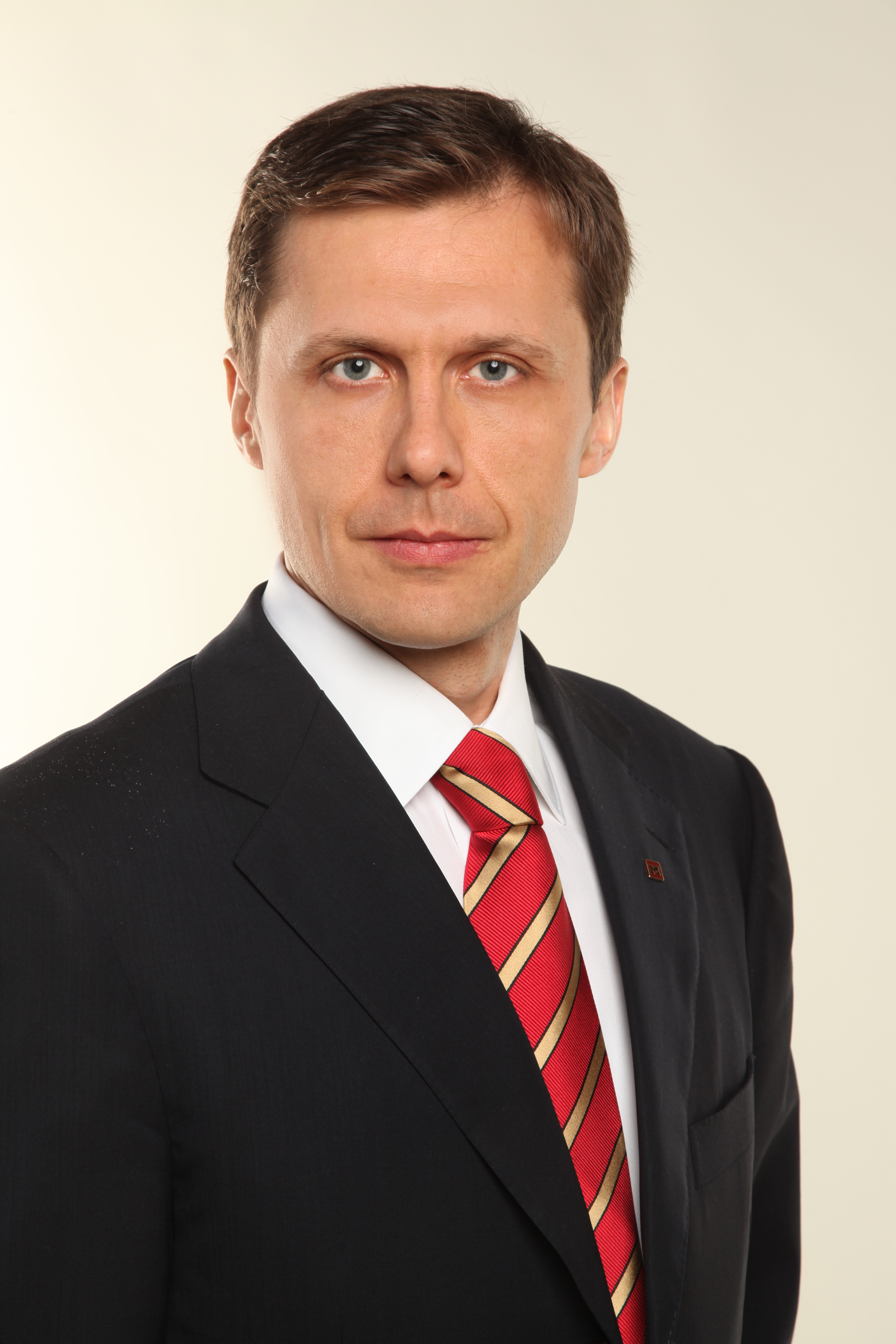

16th Minister of Ecology and Natural Resources
- In office 2 December 2014 – 2 July 2015
- Prime Minister: Arseniy Yatsenyuk
- Preceded by: Andriy Mokhnyk
- Succeeded by: Ostap Semerak

Personal details
- Born: 10 January 1971 (age 55) Oleksandriia, Kirovohrad Oblast, Ukrainian SSR
- Party: Meritocratic Party
- Education: University of Kyiv
- Occupation: lawyer, politician

Ihor Anatoliiovych Shevchenko (Ukrainian: Ігор Анатолійович Шевченко; born January 10, 1971) is a Ukrainian lawyer and public figure. He was Minister of Ecology and Natural Resources from December 2014 until July 2015.

Shevchenko was the founder and President of the Ukrainian Bar Association (2002-2007). He also founded and led the leading Ukrainian law firm "Shevchenko Didkovskiy & Partners" from 1995 to 2008 (currently "Asters").

== Education ==
In September 1977 Shevchenko's family moved to Kyiv. In 1978-1988 Shevchenko attended Kyiv public school #206.

In 1988 he enrolled into the National University of Physical Education and Sport of Ukraine, where he studied in the faculty of professional sport, specializing in athletics. Having decided not to pursue a career as a professional athlete, in 1991 Shevchenko transferred to the History Faculty of Taras Shevchenko National University of Kyiv.

In September 1992, Shevchenko transferred to the law faculty of Taras Shevchenko National University of Kyiv. Two months later, following a competitive selection process, he entered the university's newly-established Institute of International Relations in the faculty of International Law. In 1996 Shevchenko graduated with a degree in International Law and English. During his studies Shevchenko played an active role in university life, founding the League of Law Students of the Institute of International Relations and being one of the founders of the all-Ukrainian Association of Law Students (which in 2006 was converted into the League of Law Students of Ukrainian Bar Association) and was a member of the International Law Students Association. In 1996, Shevchenko organized and led the first ever visit by a delegation of Ukrainian law students to the congress of the International Law Students Association in Washington DC and the Telders International Law Moot Court Competition.

In 1995 Shevchenko studied European Union Law and Human Rights in the European University Institute (Florence, Italy).

In 1996 Shevchenko won a Muskie Scholarship of University of Minnesota Law School to study in America where he earned a Master's degree. In 2003 Shevchenko was recognized by the US State Department as the most outstanding Ukrainian graduate of the Muskie program.

In 1998 Shevchenko earned the diploma of specialist in international capital markets of the London Chartered Institute for Securities & Investment for Securities & Investment.

In 2006, Shevchenko won an international competition and became the first Ukrainian to receive a scholarship from the Yale World Fellows program to study at Yale University. The two other Ukrainians who have been selected for this program is the former Verkhovna Rada (Ukrainian parliament) deputy and Ambassador to Canada Andriy Shevchenko (2008) and frontman of Ukraine's most popular band "Okean Elzy" Svyatoslav Vakarchuk (2015).

In 2007, Shevchenko was selected by the World Economic Forum in Davos from the members of the Forum of Young Global Leaders to participate in the "Global Leadership and Public Policy in the 21st Century" program in Harvard University's John F. Kennedy School of Government.

In 1994, Shevchenko undertook an internship in the Ukrainian Embassy in Brussels at the invitation of Ukraine's Ministry of Foreign Affairs.

In 1996 he completed an internship in the central apparatus of the Anti-Monopoly Committee of Ukraine.

== Legal Practice ==
Shevchenko began his career as a lawyer in 1991 at the Legis law firm, which was founded by Alexander Chaliy.

In 1992, Shevchenko established his own law firm Principle, which he sold in 1993 and continued his law practice in a successful firm Frishberg and Partners under the leadership of the firm's founder Alex Frishberg. Starting in 1994, Shevchenko worked at another well-known law firm Vasil Kisil & Partners, working with Vasil Kisil. At the same time, Shevchenko began independent legal practice, consulting companies such as Alcatel Business Systems (Austria) and Osnova-Solsif (Ukrainian-French)

In October 1995 Shevchenko founded Shevchenko Didkovskiy and Partners law firm together with his classmate Oleksiy Didkovskiy. In 2003 the firm became the most profitable in Ukraine and in 2004 it was acknowledged as the best law firm in the country according to the respected rating of the "Legal Practice" newspaper. In 2006 Shevchenko Didkovskiy and Partners was acknowledged as the best employer in Ukraine among leading law and audit firms by the rating in "Korrespondent" magazine.

In 1996 Shevchenko successfully passed the qualification exam and received the right to be an attorney-in-law in Ukraine.

In 1997 he successfully passed the New York State Bar Exam and worked as a foreign lawyer in the headquarters of the prestigious Coudert Brothers law firm in New York. There he worked in the areas of international tax law, corporate law and international securities market regulation and also took part in legal processes for energy production sharing agreements on Sakhalin Island involving the most successful companies such as ExxonMobil, British Petroleum (BP), Shell, Chevron, and ConocoPhillips.

Ihor Shevchenko was offered to stay in the USA and become a constant member of the Coudert Brothers company, but Shevchenko wanted to develop his own law firm in Ukraine and implement his international experience there. In 1998 Shevchenko returned to Ukraine and continued to lead his law firm.

Shevchenko Didkovskiy and Partners provided legal services to leading international companies, worked as an advisor in resonant investment projects which brought billions of dollars of investment to key sectors of the Ukrainian economy, generated thousands of new jobs and introduced cutting-edge global technologies to Ukraine.

Shevchenko Didkovskiy and Partners was the first Ukrainian law firm of the Western model. Among its clients were: Microsoft, Coca-Cola, McDonald's, IKEA, Boeing, British Petroleum (BP), Gas de France, the European Bank for Reconstruction and Development, the World Bank, General Electric, Daimler AG (Mercedes-Benz, Maybach) Rolls-Royce, Telenor, Adidas, Siemens, Samsung, Nokia, Raiffeisen Bank Aval, Ukreximbank, Alcatel, Mitsubishi, Nissan, Renault, Fiat, Levi's, Philip Morris, Citibank, UBS, Deutsche Bank, UniCredit Group, Merrill Lynch, JPMorgan, Leahman Brothers, McKinsey & Company, Arcelor, Glencore, VISA, Western Union, Aerosvit, Miele, Hilti, Velux, Ecolab and many more. Shevchenko Didkovskiy and Partners also represented the interests of star footballer Andriy Shevchenko regarding the international advertising contracts. In 2006-2007 Ihor Shevchenko was a member of the board of Kyivstar, the leading Ukrainian mobile company, representing the interests of shareholder Telenor (Norway).

In 2007 Shevchenko sold his share in the firm in order to focus on public and charitable activities. The firm was renamed "Asters" and remains one of Ukraine's leading legal practices.

«Leaving the legal profession was a revolutionary development for me. I left not only jurisprudence, but I left the entire field of business. The legal profession was a very important stage of my life. If a person knows the law and its applications, not only for himself but also to help others, this is a solid foundation for growth in many spheres, for example, politics and public governance».

- From an interview with Ihor Shevchenko

Shevchenko is a member of the International Bar Association, American Bar Association, New York State Bar Association, Ukrainian-American Bar Association and Ukrainian-British Bar Association.

== Ukrainian Bar Association ==
In 2002 Ihor Shevchenko established the Ukrainian Bar Association and became its first leader. He was elected as a president of the Association in 2002 and 2007 and since 2008 has been its Honorary President. The Ukrainian Bar Association brings together more than 6000 progressive Ukrainian legal professionals from diverse spheres of practice: advocates, corporate lawyers, judges, notaries public, prosecutors and state officials, with members including the deputy head of the Presidential Administration Oleksiy Filatov, Constitutional Court Judge Stanislav Shevchuk, deputy head of the Supreme Court of Ukraine Oleksiy Muraviev, head of the High qualification commission of judges of Ukraine Serhiy Kozyakov, Judge of the Supreme Court of Ukraine Mykola Husak, deputy head of the Kyiv City State Administration (Mayor's office) Oleksiy Reznikov, Minister of Justice of Ukraine (1995-1997) Serhiy Holovatiy, Head of the Security Service of Ukraine (2005-2006) and deputy Prosecutor General (2003-2003) Ihor Drizhchaniy, Deputy Minister of Foreign Affairs (1998-2004) and deputy head of the Presidential Administration (2006-2008) Oleksandr Chaliy, Ambassador of Ukraine to the UK Court of Human Rights, Ambassador of Ukraine to the Benelux Countries, Ambassador of Ukraine to the UK Volodymyr Vasilenko, Deputy Minister of Justice Serhiy Shklyar, First Deputy Minister of Healthcare Oleksandra Pavlenko, Deputy Minister of Economic Development and Trade Representative of Ukraine Nataliya Mykolska, First Deputy Representative of the Anti-Monopoly Committee of Ukraine Mariya Nizhnik, People's Deputies of Ukraine Serhiy Vlasenko, Olena Sotnik, Victoria Ptashnyk, Andriy Zhurzhiy People's Deputy (2nd and 3rd Convocations), one of the authors of the Constitution of Ukraine Viktor Musiyaka, member of the Supreme Court of Ukraine (2004-2014) Serhiy Safulko, and famous lawyers such as Vasil Kisil, Anatoliy Dovhert, Volodymyr Ryzhyi and Dmitry Grishchenko, etc.

== Civic Activities ==
In 1999 Ihor Shevchenko co-founded the European Business Association, which unites the leading European, international and Ukrainian businesses operating in Ukraine.

In 2001 he co-founded and became the deputy head of the Internet Association of Ukraine, which today is the most influential civic organization of the Ukrainian internet industry.

In May 2006, Ihor Shevchenko founded the Ukrainian Advocates Association and became a member of its Supervisory Board. The Association unites the best advocaats and is the top association of practicing lawyers in Ukraine.

In 2006 Shevchenko established the Ukrainian Forum of Young Global Leaders, which undertakes projects in the area of education and professional development, youth and social entrepreneurship, healthcare and promotion of healthy lifestyles, ecology and environmental security and national cultural projects. One of the projects of the Ukrainian Forum of Young Leaders was the "Yellow and Blue – the national pride of Ukraine" project honoring the national flag of Ukraine. Forum's activists as part of this project launched an annual celebration of the Ukrainian Flag Day with the participation of influential public figures. Until 2008, the Ukrainian Flag Day existed only nominally. The Supervisory Board of the Forum of Young Leaders among others included the President of Poland Aleksander Kwasniewski (1995-2005), President of Mexico Ernesto Zedillo (1994-2000) and the Minister of Foreign Affairs of Ukraine Anatoliy Zlenko (1990-1994).

Together with Hanna Hopko, Ihor Shevchenko took active part in the anti-tobacco project of Michael Bloomberg "Tobacco Free Kids" which organized press conferences and a rallies against smoking, which included the participation of Ukrainian celebrities and an awareness campaign on Ukrainian top TV channels. As a result, an anti-tobacco law was adopted which banned tobacco advertising, smoking in public buildings and increased taxes on cigarettes. According to experts, these activities led to a significant decline in smoking in Ukraine. Shevchenko also took part in the creation of the civic project "New Citizen" together with Oleh Ribachuk and Svitlana Zalishchuk.

== Forum of Young Global Leaders ==
In 2005 the World Economic Forum in Davos nominated Ihor Shevchenko as a Young Global Leader and included him in the Forum of Young Global Leaders, one of the key projects of the Davos WEF forum. The co-chairs of the Forum of Young Global Leaders are Queen Rania of Jordan and the founder of the World Economic Forum Klaus Schwab. Shevchenko was the first Ukrainian to become a member of this prestigious global community. Some of the other Forum members include British Prime Minister David Cameron, Georgian President Mikheil Saakashvili, Canadian Trade Minister Chrystia Freeland, founders of Google Sergey Brin and Larry Page, founder of Facebook Mark Zuckerberg, founder of Wikipedia Jimmy Wales, head of Alibaba Group Jack Ma, co-founder of PayPal Max Levchin, lawyer Amal Clooney, Ivanka Trump, Chelsea Clinton, Jonathan Soros, Miguel Forbes, Michael Schumacher, Crown Prince of Norway Haakon, Princess Victoria of Sweden, Beatrice Trussardi, Hollywood actors Leonardo DiCaprio and Ashton Kutcher, model Natalia Vodianova, footballer and Minister of Energy and Natural Resources of Georgia Kakha Kaladze, presidents, ministers, congressmen and parliament members of many countries. Recent members of the forum from Ukraine are Andriy Kolodyuk, Wladimir Klitschko, Hanna Hopko and Mustafa Nayyem.

In 2006 and 2008 Shevchenko was an official participant of the World Economic Forum in Davos.

In 2012 Ihor Shevchenko founded the first branch of the World Economic Forum Global Shapers initiative in Ukraine. Following invitations from Shevchenko, the first participants of the forum included MP Hanna Hopko, Deputy Minister of Ecology and Natural Resources Svitlana Kolomiyets, Director of the Department of International Projects at the Ministry of Economy and Trade Olena Tregub, co-founder of Petcube Yaroslav Azhnyuk and founder of internet-portal PLATFORMA Oleksandr Akimenko.

== Public Governance Activities ==
2005 – Advisor to the Prime Minister of Ukraine Yulia Tymoshenko on foreign investments

2005 – Member of the working group on foreign investments of the Council of Ministers of the Autonomous Republic of Crimea

2001-2006 – Advisor to the Kyiv City Mayor Olexander Omelchenko on foreign investments

2005 – Member of the Civic Council of Ministry of Justice

2005-2006 – Member of the Council of Entrepreneurs of the Cabinet of Ministers of Ukraine

2006-2007 – Member of the National Commission on strengthening democracy and the rule of law under the President of Ukraine

2008 – Member of the Expert council of the parliament of Ukraine of industrial and regulatory policy and entrepreneurship

2014-2015 – Member of the National Reforms Council under the President of Ukraine

== Minister of Ecology and Natural Resources ==
In December 2014, Ihor Shevchenko entered the coalition government led by Arseniy Yatsenyuk as the Minister of Ecology and Natural Resources of Ukraine.

Immediately after his appointment, Shevchenko fired all deputy ministers and heads of departments of the Ministry who were involved in corruption. He then terminated all corrupt schemes and returned more than 20 oil and gas fields stolen by accomplices of the former Ukrainian President Viktor Yanukovych to the state ownership. During his time as minister Shevchenko carried out a number of important reforms in the field of ecology and natural resources. He established the first public tenders for the posts of directors of reservations and national parks were held with online broadcasting of candidates' interviews. Improved water control processes were implemented, thus eliminating a corruption scheme at the Ecological Inspectorate of the Black Sea which previously significantly reduced the competitiveness of Ukrainian seaports. Receiving of the conclusion document on international shipping of potentially hazardous cargo was shortened from 30 to 10 days and the requirement to obtain a certificate from the Ministry of Ecology certifying the absence of ozone-depleting substances was cancelled for obvious cases so that the shipping of goods across the border could be simplified. The Ministry of Ecology and Natural Resources was the first Ministry which implemented the "Open Budget" project, whereby all the expenses of the Ministry were made available for inspection and control by every citizen online. All possible procurement of the Ministry was transferred to a transparent public format via the online Prozorro system. This initiative has eliminated manipulations of auctions for the sale of licenses for use of mineral resources and developed a new transparent and fair system of auctions. At a donor conference in London, with the personal participation of Shevchenko, an additional €540 million was collected for the construction of the New Safe Confinement for the destroyed 4th power unit of the Chernobyl Nuclear Power Plant, as well as a grant of €15 million from the German government for Ukrainian development of nature reservations and national parks. As a result of intense multi-round negotiations Shevchenko managed to extend expired contracts with Japanese companies worth $500 million for environmental projects under the Kyoto Protocol. During Shevchenko's time as Minister, Ukraine improved from 95th to 44th place in the international Environmental Performance Index (EPI), which measures achievements in terms of the state of the environment and natural resources management.

However, Shevchenko and Prime Minister Yatsenyuk could not find a common tongue. Shevchenko's views often did not align with the views of Yatsenyuk, in particular when it came to the questions of effective governance of state property, tax increases and the absence of systemic reforms. In addition, Shevchenko refused Yatsenyuk's demand to appoint Hennadiy Rudenko as head of the state geological service as he had been an associate of President Yanukovych in the 2004 elections.

Another scandal erupted when it became known that an MP from the People's Front party Mykola Martynenko and the Minister of Internal Affairs Arsen Avakov strongly pressured Shevchenko to appoint their ally Mykola Lizun as Deputy Minister, which Shevchenko refused.

"They tried to force a person into the post of First Deputy of the State Ecological Inspectorate. Minister of the Cabinet of Ministers Anna Onishchenko (a person from Yatsenyuk's team – RBK Ukraine) called and firmly insisted to appoint "their" person as First Deputy of the state ecological inspectorate. I refused."

- from an interview with Ihor Shevchenko

The key moment in the confrontation between Prime Minister Yatsenyuk and Minister Shevchenko was Shevchenko's position regarding the members of the committee for the selection of members for the National Anti-Corruption Bureau. Shevchenko insisted on new selections and the cancellation of the decision made by the Cabinet, which was adopted as a result of manipulation, and the inclusion into the committee of representatives of independent civil society organizations, rather than insiders ready to vote as they would be told by the Secretariat of the Cabinet of Ministers of Ukraine. For the first time in the history of Ukraine, an acting Minister openly and publicly criticized the Cabinet's decision, as stated at a joint press conference with MPs Yegor Sobolev and Sergei Leshchenko and representatives of civil society.

Immediately after that, on 24 June 2015, at a seating of the Cabinet of Ministers, Prime Minister Yatsenyuk demanded the immediate resignation of Shevchenko as a warning to other ministers, which he refused.

Soon, Yatsenyuk and then Oleh Lyashko accused Shevchenko from the tribune of the parliament of not attending the site of a fire at an oil refinery near Kyiv, and that Shevchenko was abroad during the accident. Shevchenko denied these accusations, saying that firefighting is not included in the mandate of the Minister of Ecology and is the direct responsibility of the Ministry of Internal Affairs, which includes the State Agency for Emergency Situations. Shevchenko also brought irrefutable evidence that he was in Ukraine at the start of the fire until its complete elimination, and that he visited the scene of the fire and met the head of the State Environmental Service and the head of the operational headquarters for fire suppression.

Further Yatsenyuk, Lyashko and several MPs from the People's Front party accused Shevchenko of flying free of charge on the corporate jet of Oleksandr Onishchenko to Ukraine. In turn, Shevchenko provided documentary evidence that he personally paid for his flight and that the plane belonged to a Dutch aviation company and not Onishchenko.

Despite documentary evidence, the conflict between Shevchenko and Yatsenyuk had reached such a point that in July 2015, as a result of political collusion, Ihor Shevchenko was released from the post of Minister of Ecology and Natural Resources citing "acts that may contain corruption offenses". In turn, Shevchenko accused Prime Minister Yatsenyuk of "political reprisals", "defending the interests of oligarchic clans" and corruption. In political circles it was widely rumored that Shevchenko was brought into the government on the recommendation of the All-Ukrainian Political Union "Bat’kivschyna" party and its leader Yulia Tymoshenko personally. An advisor to the Minister of Internal Affairs Anton Herashchenko published a relevant document.

In March 2016, Solomenskiy district court of Kyiv declared the charges against the ex-Minister of Ecology Ihor Shevchenko to be unfounded and dismissed the case initiated by the Security Service of Ukraine. At its session of March 22, the court ruled that Shevchenko had not violated Part 1, Article 28, paragraph 2 of the Law "On Prevention of Corruption", as he was accused by the SSU, declaring a conflict of interest in the actions of the ex-Minister was absent.

Shevchenko initiated 10 lawsuits against a variety of parties for false accusations, including against former Prime Minister Arseniy Yatsenyuk, MPs Serhiy Pashinsky, Tatiana Chornovil, Irina Suslova, Yuri Chizhmar, Andrei Pomazanov, Leonid Emets and the leader of the Radical Party, Oleh Lyashko, who claimed that the post of Minister for Shevchenko was bought for $5 million by Oleksandr Onishchenko. Information about the fact that during the large-scale fire near Kyiv Shevchenko was in Nice was also not confirmed. The State Border Service confirmed that Shevchenko was in Ukraine during the fire.

On 29 July, the Kyiv City Prosecutor closed criminal proceedings against Ihor Shevchenko due to the absence of criminal offense. Shevchenko informed the public about it on his Facebook page, posting the relevant documents.

"This investigation was under personal control of Avakov (Interior Minister Arsen Avakov), Shokin (former head of the PGU Victor Shokin), Sytnik (director of NABU Artem Sytnik), Holodnitsky (SAP head Nazar Holodnitsky), Sakvarelidze (former Deputy Attorney General, Attorney Odesa region Davit Sakvarelidze) and Kasko (ex-deputy head of the PGU Vitaliy Kasko). But as they say, control is not controlled ... in the end, the case was transferred to the prosecutor of Kyiv, who took the responsibility to stop this insanity and close the case," wrote Shevchenko.

== Politics ==
Until 2011, Ihor Shevchenko was not a member of any political party. In 2011 he established the Meritocratic Party of Ukraine. In 2012 discussions were held about cooperation in parliamentary elections with Anatoliy Gritsenko (Civic Position) and Vitali Klitschko (UDAR) but the forces remained independent. In 2013, Shevchenko left the post of head of the party, but remained a member of its governing council. In May 2016, Shevchenko announced the end of his membership in the Meritocratic Party of Ukraine.

"I am convinced that if Ukrainians want to see their country become truly European and successful - in reality, not just by formal membership of the EU – the choice to bring decent people to power, as is the essence of meritocracy, is clear. But, unfortunately, for various reasons the Meritocratic Party of Ukraine has become obsolete as a political organization. "

From an interview with Ihor Shevchenko

In local elections in October 2015, Ihor Shevchenko was a candidate for the post of mayor of Bilhorod-Dnistrovskyi (Odesa Oblast) as an independent candidate. He came in 2nd position, taking 28% of the vote. After the elections Shevchenko remained in Bilgorod-Dnistrovskyi for another year, where he founded the "News of Akkerman" newspaper and leads the "Successful Akkerman" civic organization.

Shevchenko is currently not a member of any political party.

On 13 November 2018 Shevchenko told during a press conference that he intends to participate in the 2019 presidential elections; but also stated he would not participate in the elections if a new candidate appears who "better meets the requirements." He submitted the documents to the Central Election Commission for registration as a presidential candidate on 31 December 2018 (which was also the first day of the electoral campaign). He was the first to do so.

== Charity ==
Since the beginning of the 1990s, Ihor Shevchenko has taken active part in the revival of the Rotary movement in Ukraine, participating in the establishment and activities of Rotary Club-Kyiv. Rotary International is a worldwide network of clubs of successful people engaged in charitable activities since 1904. One of the most important achievements of this international organization is overcoming the global epidemic of polio.

In 2008-2009 Ihor Shevchenko was the head of the Board of "SOS - Children's Village - Ukraine" Charity Foundation, the largest international charity in support of orphans and children left without parental care and children at risk of family loss. Children's Village is a unique initiative providing a sense of family and long-term social support and education of orphans. Shevchenko significantly accelerated the completion of the construction and launch of the first Ukrainian SOS-Children's Village in Brovary near Kyiv.

With the financial support of Ihor Shevchenko, the book "Intelligent Politics" by Sergey Datsyuk and "Control Over One's Mind" by Heorhiy Pocheptsov were published and Ukrainian translations of "Why Georgia Succeeded" by Larisa Burakova and "The China Model: Political Meritocracy and the Limits of Democracy" by Daniel A. Bell were published.

== Family ==
Shevchenko is single. His parents – Maria and Anatoliy Shevchenko – are retired engineers. He has a brother Pavlo Shevchenko.

== Sports ==
From 1982 to 1991 Shevchenko actively participated in athletics and competed in track-and-field. He was a candidate for national master of sport in the 400-meter phurdles, for which he was a member of the junior team of the Ukrainian SSR and a candidate for the junior team of the USSR.

Political offices
Preceded by Andriy Mokhnyk	Minister of Ecology and Natural Resources; 2014–2015	Succeeded by Ostap Semerak
