= Andriy Mokhnyk =

Ukrainian politician

- Андрій Мохник
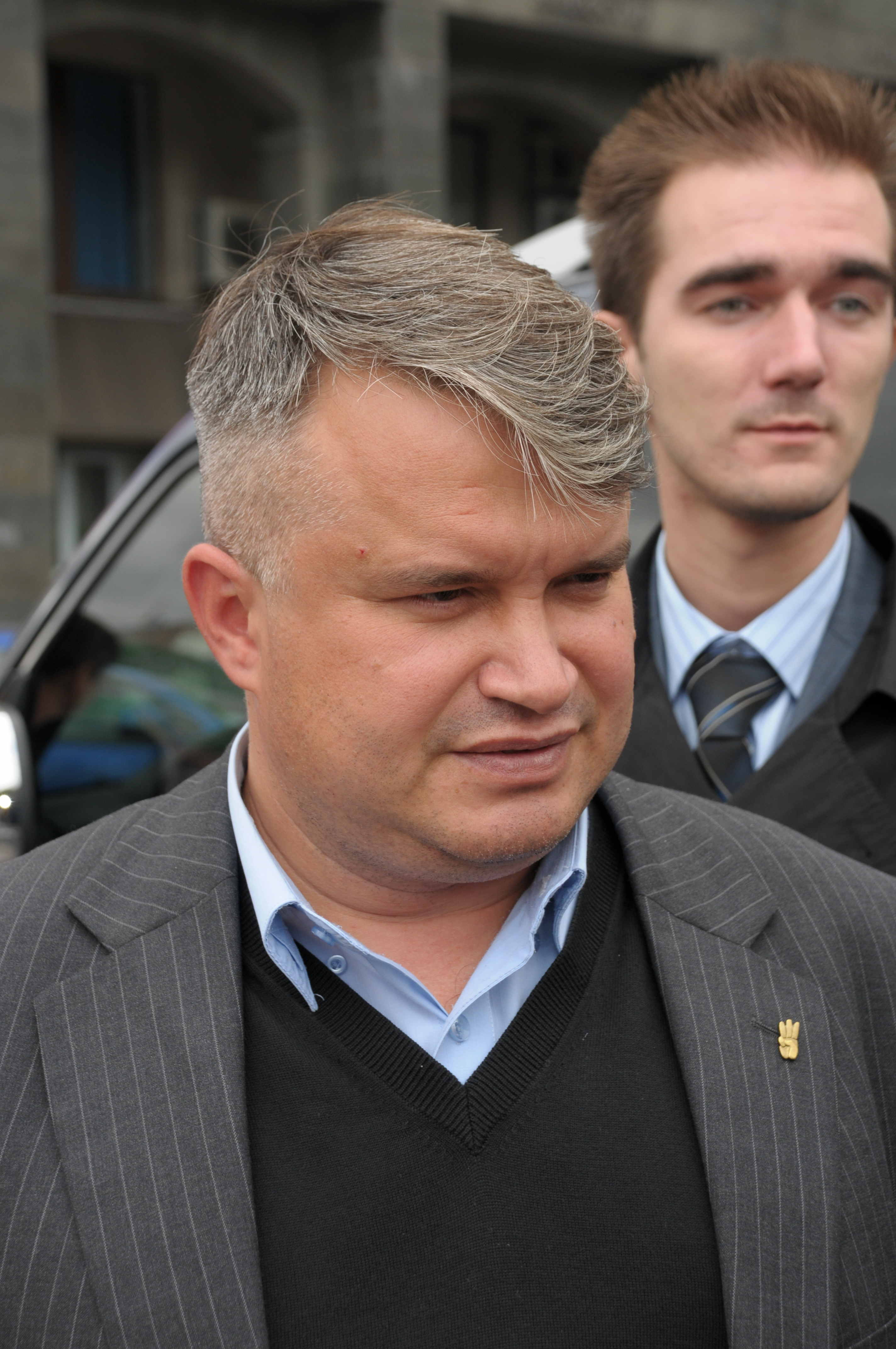
- Mokhnyk in 2012

15th Minister of Ecology and Natural Resources of Ukraine
- In office 27 February 2014 – 12 November 2014
- Prime Minister: Arseniy Yatsenyuk
- Preceded by: Oleh Proskuryakov
- Succeeded by: Ihor Shevchenko

Personal details
- Born: 15 June 1972 (age 54) Lypovets, Vinnitsa Oblast, Ukrainian SSR
- Party: All-Ukrainian Union "Freedom"
- Education: Kyiv Institute of Civil Engineering; Kyiv National Taras Shevchenko University

Andriy Volodymyrovych Mokhnyk (Ukrainian: Андрій Володимирович Мохник) is a Ukrainian politician, Deputy Chairman of the right-wing All-Ukrainian Union "Freedom" party, and a former Minister of Ecology and Natural Resources of Ukraine.

== Biography ==
From the age of six to fourteen he lived with his parents in the town of Pripyat, now abandoned and part of the Chernobyl Exclusion Zone since the Chernobyl accident. After school he worked in education, with a personal experience of combat Russification. For a while he worked in the Ministry of Education of Ukraine..In 1994 he graduated from the Kyiv Institute of Civil Engineering as a civil engineer. He worked as a foreman engineer at the Research Institute.

In 2011 he graduated from Kyiv National Taras Shevchenko University majoring in law. He completed postgraduate studies in "History of Ukraine".

== Activities within Svoboda ==
Mokhnyk joined the nationalist movement in the mid-1990s. By September 2010 he was head of the Kyiv organization Svoboda, and deputy of the "Kyiv Regional Council" from 2010–2012. In 2012 he won a seat in the Ukrainian parliament's 7th convocation for the All-Ukrainian Union "Freedom". He rose to deputy chairman and is member of their Political Council. He met with representatives of Svoboda's Italian counterpart, the Forza Nuova, discussing cooperation regarding the "preservation of each country's national identity" in October 2013.

Mokhnyk has been described as Tiagnybok's "right hand man in parliament", who sees "Russia as Ukraine’s main foreign enemy, seeking to oppress Ukrainians, control their riches, and sabotage EU integration". In 2012 he has stated that Ukrainians suffered like Jewish people, and that the Holodomor genocide, a 1930s man-made famine that killed up to 7.5 million, nearly eliminated Ukrainians. He has said that Ukraine's internal enemies are an "oligarchic class composed of former Communist apparatchiks, Komsomol leaders, KGB agents and straight forward criminals of primarily non-Ukrainian ethnic descent". He supports banning Communist party members, former Soviet apparatchiks and KGB agents from holding office. Mokhnyk is on record for supporting re-nationalization of "strategic state assets", which he claims were "stolen by oligarchs through corrupt privatizations" and increasing taxes for large businesses rather than small and medium businesses. He also supports stating Ukrainian passport holders' ethnicity.

In the Yatsenyuk Government that came to power on 27 February 2014, Mokhnyk was Minister of Environment and Natural Resources. On 12 November 2014 he and his fellow two Svoboda ministers in the Yatsenyuk Government resigned (they became acting ministers till a new Government was formed). In the October 2014 parliamentary election Mokhnyk had been 8th on the election list of his party; since the party came 0,29% short to overcome the 5% threshold to win seats on the nationwide list he was not re-elected into parliament.

== Private life ==
He is married and has one daughter, Miroslava, living in Kyiv.
