= Serhiy Shevchenko =

Serhiy Shevchenko or Serhii Shevchenko (Ukrainian: Сергій Шевченко) may refer to:

- Serhiy Shevchenko (footballer, born May 1960), Kyrgyz-Ukrainian footballer
- Serhiy Shevchenko (footballer, born August 1960), Ukrainian footballer
- Serhiy Shevchenko (footballer, born 1958) (1958–2024), Soviet Ukrainian footballer and coach
- Serhiy Shevchenko (footballer, born 1953), Soviet Ukrainian footballer and coach
- Serhiy Shevchenko (diplomat) (1908–?), Soviet diplomat from Ukraine
- Serhii Shevchenko (born 1960), Ukrainian writer and journalist

== See also ==
- Shevchenko, a family name
