= Szewczyk =

Szewczyk is a Polish occupational surname, derived from the occupation of szewc ("shoemaker"). It is related to the Czech name Ševčík and Ukrainian surname Shevchik (Шевчик) and Shevchuk (Шевчук).

It may refer to:

- Jerzy Luczak-Szewczyk (1923–1975), Polish-Swedish artist
- Maciej Szewczyk (born 1994), Polish footballer
- Małgorzata Szewczyk (1828–1905), Polish nun
- Roman Szewczyk (born 1965), Polish footballer
- Szymon Szewczyk (born 1982), Polish basketball player
- Wilhelm Szewczyk (1916–1991), Polish writer
- Zbigniew Szewczyk (born 1967), Polish footballer

== See also ==
- Shevchenko, a Ukrainian cognate
