= Igor Shevchenko (lawyer) =

Igor Shevchenko Ігор Шевченко
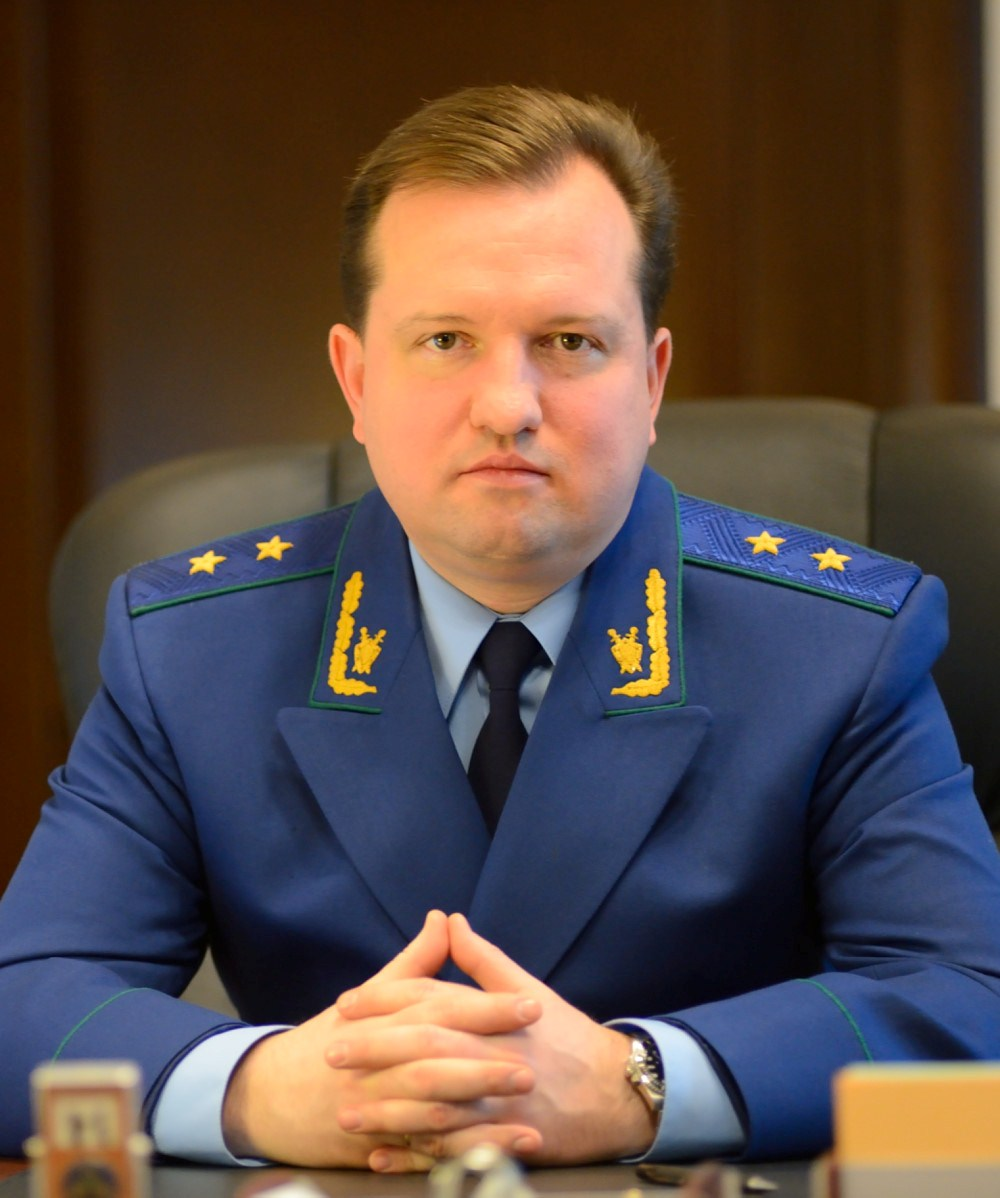

Prosecutor of Sevastopol
- Incumbent
- Assumed office 2 May 2014
- Prime Minister: Sergey Aksyonov

Personal details
- Born: Ігор Сергеевич Шевченко Sevastopol, Ukrainian SSR
- Education: Yaroslav Mudryi National Law University - Jurisprudence
- Occupation: Attorney

Igor Sergeievich Shevchenko (Russian: Игорь Сергеевич Шевченко; born in Sevastopol) on 9 February 1979 is a Russian prosecutor from Ukraine who was appointed Prosecutor of Sevastopol, Crimea, by Vladimir Putin on May 2, 2014.

== Education ==
He graduated second in his class receiving a jurisprudence degree from the Yaroslov Law University in Kharkiv, Ukraine.

== Career ==
In 2001, he became an assistant prosecutor in the Nakhimovsky district of the city of Sevastopol in Crimea. Then, in 2003, he joined the Prosecutor's Office in the city of Sevastopol. On March 25, 2014, he became the acting public prosecutor of the city of Sevastopol by order of Yury Chaika, the Prosecutor General of Russia, and since May 2, 2014, he has been appointed by Vladimir Putin as the Prosecutor of the City of Sevastopol.

=== Sanctions ===
He was sanctioned by the UK government in 2014 in relation to the Russo-Ukrainian War.

== Personal wealth ==
During 2014, he earned 1.966 million Rubles which is equivalent to the 1.9 million Rubles salary of Nataliya Poklonskaya, who was the Prosecutor of Crimea. He owns a Volkswagen Passat, two plots of land and an apartment in Sevastopol, but his ownership of a 1000 square meters plot acquired March 11, 2010, from Sergei Kunitsyn is under litigation in the Balaklava District Court since 2018. This plot is at Cape Lermontov near the "Caravel" resort, but Sergei Kunitsyn admitted that his signature on the land transfer had been forged.

== Sanctions ==
During 2014, Shevchenko was placed under European Union, Switzerland, and Liechtenstein sanctions in May, Canadian sanctions in June, Japanese sanctions in August, and Australian sanctions in September for actively implementing Russia's annexation of Sevastopol during the Russian interference in Ukraine.

== See also ==
- Timeline of the annexation of Crimea by the Russian Federation
