= Zapatero (surname) =

Zapatero is a Spanish-language occupational surname literally meaning "shoemaker".

- José Luis Rodríguez Zapatero (born 1960), Prime Minister of Spain from 2004 to 2011.
- Carlos Arroyo Zapatero (born 1964), Spanish architect.
- José Ignacio Zapatero (born 1971), Spanish rugby union player.
- Ismael Piñera Zapatero (born 1971), Spanish soccer player.
