= Olena Tregub =

Ukrainian defence anti-corruption leader

- Олена Трегуб
- Born: 15 September 1982; Kyiv, Ukraine
- Occupations: Civil Society Leader, Executive Director and Secretary General of NAKO
- Website: https://nako.org.ua/en

Olena Tregub (Ukrainian: Олена Трегуб; born 15 September 1982) is a Ukrainian civil society leader, anti-corruption advocate, and expert on defense reform, international relations, and sanctions policy. She is known for her work in promoting transparency, good governance, and accountability in Ukraine's defense and security sectors. As a government official, she was responsible for international aid management in Ukraine.

In 2019, Tregub co-founded the Independent Defense Anti-Corruption Commission (NAKO), a non-governmental organization dedicated to reducing corruption in areas critical to Ukraine's national security.

== Early career and education ==
Olena Tregub studied at the National University of Kyiv-Mohyla Academy, graduating with a Bachelors in Political Science. At postgraduate level she studied at the Central European University in Budapest, and the Fletcher School of Law and Diplomacy at Tufts University, specialising in international relations and public policy. She began her career in journalism and international relations, providing insights into the political and economic landscape of Ukraine.

In the U.S., Olena held multiple roles including adjunct professor of political science at Adelphi University, media liaison at the U.N. in New York, and U.S.-based correspondent for the Ukrainian News Agency and the Kyiv Post.

Tregub co-founded an educational consulting group offering professional internship and study abroad programs for young North Americans in the Central and Eastern European region (Global Education Leadership). She also served as a columnist for the Kyiv Post and a researcher on Ukraine for the New York Times. Her writings on Ukrainian domestic and international politics have been featured in various European and American media outlets.

== Government service ==
After residing in Washington D.C. for ten years, Tregub in 2015 returned to Ukraine and joined the government, contributing to the post-Maidan democratic transformation of Ukraine. She was appointed Director of International Aid Coordination for the Ministry of Economic Development and Trade, where she oversaw a portfolio in excess of $10 billion of international development projects. During her tenure, she launched various reform initiatives, including establishment of the Better Regulation Delivery Office. Tregub came to prominence when she sought to introduce extensive anti-corruption measures, which controversially led to her dismissal in 2017 and later reinstatement, following the ruling of the Kyiv District Administrative Court in October 2018.

== Contributions to anti-corruption efforts ==
In 2016, Tregub collaborated with Transparency International to establish the Independent Anti-Corruption Commission (previously - The Independent Defence Anti-Corruption Committee) (NAKO). Initially, NAKO consisted of three Ukrainian and three international experts, concentrating its efforts on addressing corruption within Ukraine's defence sector.

At NAKO, Tregub has led efforts to implement OECD corporate governance and anti-corruption standards in Ukraine's defence industry, particularly within Ukroboronprom, Ukraine's state-owned defence conglomerate. Under her leadership, NAKO has been active in monitoring the recruitment processes for new directors of state-owned enterprises (SOEs) and publicizing cases of corruption within the industry.

Her tenure at NAKO is noted for contributions to drafting legislative reforms, such as the bill on the corporatization of Ukroboronprom companies, the development of a Code of Ethics, and the terms of reference for the first international financial and forensic audits of Ukroboronprom.

== Political influence and civil society work ==
Tregub has maintained strong connections with key decision-makers in Ukraine, even while spending periods abroad. She is actively involved in shaping policy discussions related to defense reform, anti-corruption, and international aid coordination. Tregub's work has contributed to the establishment of supervisory boards in defense agencies and has influenced legislative changes aimed at improving transparency in the defense sector.

== International advocacy and diplomacy ==
Tregub has extensive experience working with international donors and organizations, including the UN, USAID, EBRD, World Bank and IMF and the EU. Her advocacy efforts have focused on strengthening Ukraine's ties with Western partners, securing international support, and promoting reforms that align Ukraine's defense practices with NATO standards.

Tregub's role involves extensive travel to the United States, Europe and Asia to advocate for continued support for Ukraine, especially during times of conflict. Her efforts aim to secure international backing and resources necessary for Ukraine to uphold its sovereignty, and to combat corruption effectively. She often participates in global forums and policy discussions.

On 28 January 2022, in advance of the full-scale invasion of Ukraine, Tregub appeared on an Atlantic Council C-Span broadcast urging NATO's Secretary General, Jens Stoltenberg, to support Ukraine in the face of imminent invasion of its territory.

Following the full-scale invasion, together with other civil society leaders, Tregub met with US politicians including Nancy Pelosi, Tom Cotton, Bernie Sanders, Adam Kinzinger, August Pfluger, Kirsten Gillibrand, Marsha Blackburn, and Tina Smith. Tregub's message centred on Ukraine's resilience and the determination of the Ukrainian people to prevail in the face of Russian aggression, and shoring up US military backing and support. This included advocacy for Ukraine's acquisition of F16 fighter jets, together with the late Andrii Pilshchykov ("Juice"), Oleksii Mes ("Moonfish"), and other pilots and civil society leaders.

== Sanctions work ==
Tregub is an expert on international sanctions and export controls. Her research has highlighted the failure of current sanctions regimes to prevent the flow of Western technologies to hostile states such as Russia, Iran, and North Korea. She has been a vocal advocate for closing loopholes in export control policies and has called for stronger measures to prevent the transfer of critical components used in the production of weapons by these countries.

In 2023 Tregub appeared at the Senate Hearing of the US Helsinki Commission to testify on Russian evasion of sanctions and money laundering.

== Media profile ==
Tregub is a frequent commentator in both Ukrainian and international media. She has been interviewed on topics ranging from defense reforms and anti-corruption efforts to international sanctions and geopolitical issues. Her work has been featured in outlets such as Bloomberg, BBC, France24, Sky News, Voice of America, KBS, TRT, NDTV and Al Jazeera, and other prominent news platforms.

== Recognition and awards ==
Tregub's work has earned her recognition both in Ukraine and internationally. Her insights contribute to shaping international perceptions and policies regarding Ukraine, particularly in relation to defence and security sectors.

Tregub has received several awards for her reforming anti-corruption work. In 2012, the World Economic Forum chose her to represent Ukraine as a Global Shaper at its Davos forum. In 2017 she was selected as a Millenium Leader by the US Atlantic Council. She is the recipient of the CEU Alumni Impact Award, and has been repeatedly named in Top 100 Women of Ukraine by New Voice of Ukraine. She is a board member of Hromadske TV since 2020 and a member of the Steering Committee of B4Ukraine Coalition.
