= Alexander Shevchenko =

Alexander Shevchenko or Aleksandr Shevchenko (Russian: Александр Шевченко) may refer to:

- Alexander Shevchenko (ice hockey) (born 1992), Russian ice hockey player
- Alexander Shevchenko (curler) (born 1971), Russian wheelchair curler
- Aleksandr Shevchenko (tennis) (born 2000), Kazakhstani tennis player
- Aleksandr Shevchenko (1883–1948), Ukrainian painter and sculptor
- Alex Shevchenko, co-founder of Grammarly

== See also ==
- Oleksandr Shevchenko (disambiguation)
