= Petcube =

Technology company that produces smart devices for pets

Petcube, Inc.
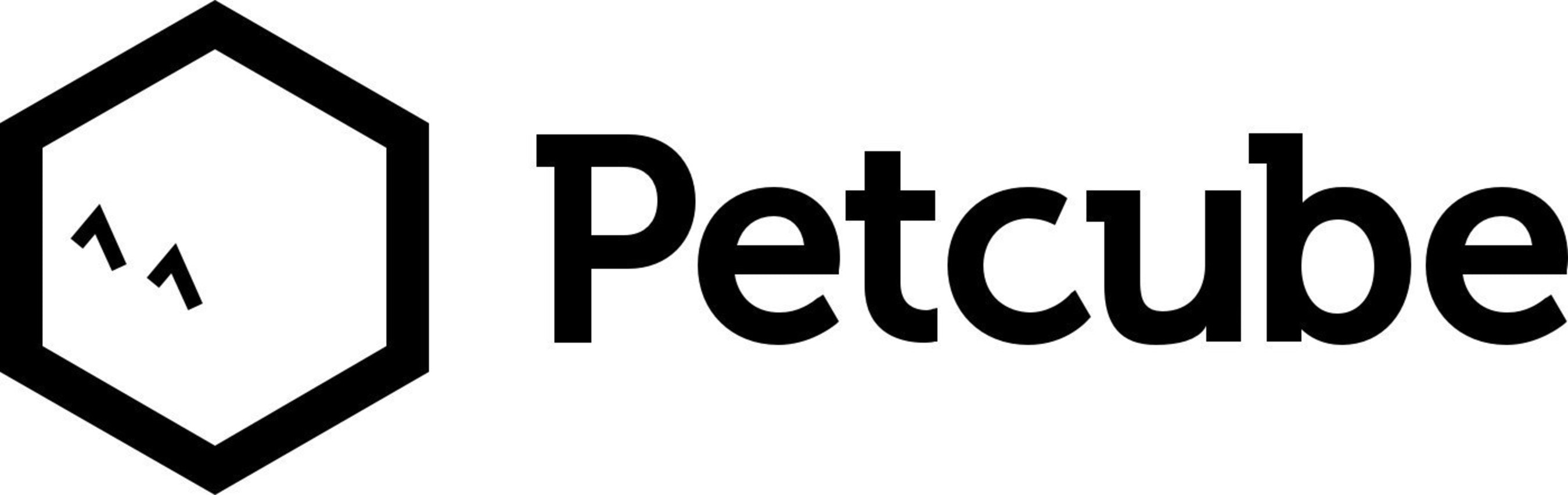
- Type: Private
- Industry: smart, connected products
- Founded: July 16, 2013; 13 years ago
- Founder: Yaroslav Azhnyuk, Andrey Klen, Alex Neskin
- Headquarters: San Francisco, United States
- Area served: Worldwide
- Key people: Anastasia Kuhar (CEO), Alex Neskin (CTO), Andrey Klen (CDO), Yaroslav Azhnyuk (president)
- Products: Petcube Bites; Petcube Play; Petcube Camera
- Number of employees: 100
- Website: petcube.com

Petcube, Inc. is a technology company that designs and develops smart devices for pets which combine cameras with treat dispensers and laser pointer toys.

== History ==
The company was incorporated in 2013 in Kyiv, Ukraine by Alex Neskin, Yaroslav Azhnyuk, and Andrey Klen. Typically for a startup, Petcube aimed to solve the problem the founders faced on their own: Neskin's dog Rocky suffered and misbehaved due to separation anxiety.

Within two Kickstarter campaigns the project raised $250,000 in 2013 (becoming the best funded pet product by that time) and $315,000 in 2016. In 2017, Petcube announced a treat partnership with Wellness and acquired a Canadian pet-focused startup Petbot. In the following years, Petcube raised over $14 million in seed money and Series A financing from Y Combinator, Almaz Capital, Aventures, and other investors.

== Products ==
Petcube offers three devices: Petcube Camera, Petcube Bites with camera and a treat dispenser, and Petcube Play which features a laser pointer to keep the pet entertained (distracted) while the owner is away.

The devices can stream and record video, toss treats, allow users to communicate with a pet two-way, and connect to Amazon Alexa. Paid subscription enables cloud video storage, automated recording triggered by sound or motion, smart alerts (bark, meow, pet, and human notifications), and adds a web interface.

== Awards ==
- In 2014, Petcube won the prestigious European start-up competition ‘Europas’ in the ‘Best Hardware Start-up’ category.
- Petcube also won Macworld’s ‘6 about to break’ competition, sharing first place with Avegant Glyph.
- In 2016, the company was ranked 14th in the list of Ukraine’s most innovative companies, as compiled by forbes.net.ua.

== Charity ==
Petcube cooperates with shelters and helps to save pets and find them new homes. The company donates its products and organize events for pet activists. As a Ukrainian brand, Petcube joined United24 charity project and donates proceeds from its pet cameras to the future rebuilding of Ukraine.
