= Eduard Shevchenko =

Ukrainian military personnel

Eduard Hryhorovych Shevchenko (Ukrainian: Едуард Григорович Шевченко; born 19 April 1977) is a Ukrainian soldier of the Ukrainian Navy, captain 1st rank, head of the 73rd Naval Center of Special Operations between 2016 and 2017. Knight of the II and III degree Orders of Bohdan Khmelnytsky, full knight of the Order for Courage. He was detained by the Security Service of Ukraine on March 7, 2023, as an agent of Russian intelligence who was engaged in preparations for the capture by the Russian Army of the city of Ochakiv in the Mykolaiv Oblast during the Russian invasion of Ukraine.
