= Dmitry Shevchenko =

Dmitriy Shevchenko is the name of:

- Dmitry Shevchenko (fencer) (born 1967), Russian fencer
- Dmitry Shevchenko (discus thrower) (born 1968), Russian discus thrower
