= Hennadii Kryvosheia =

Ukrainian politician

Hennadii Kryvosheia Кривошея Геннадій Григорович
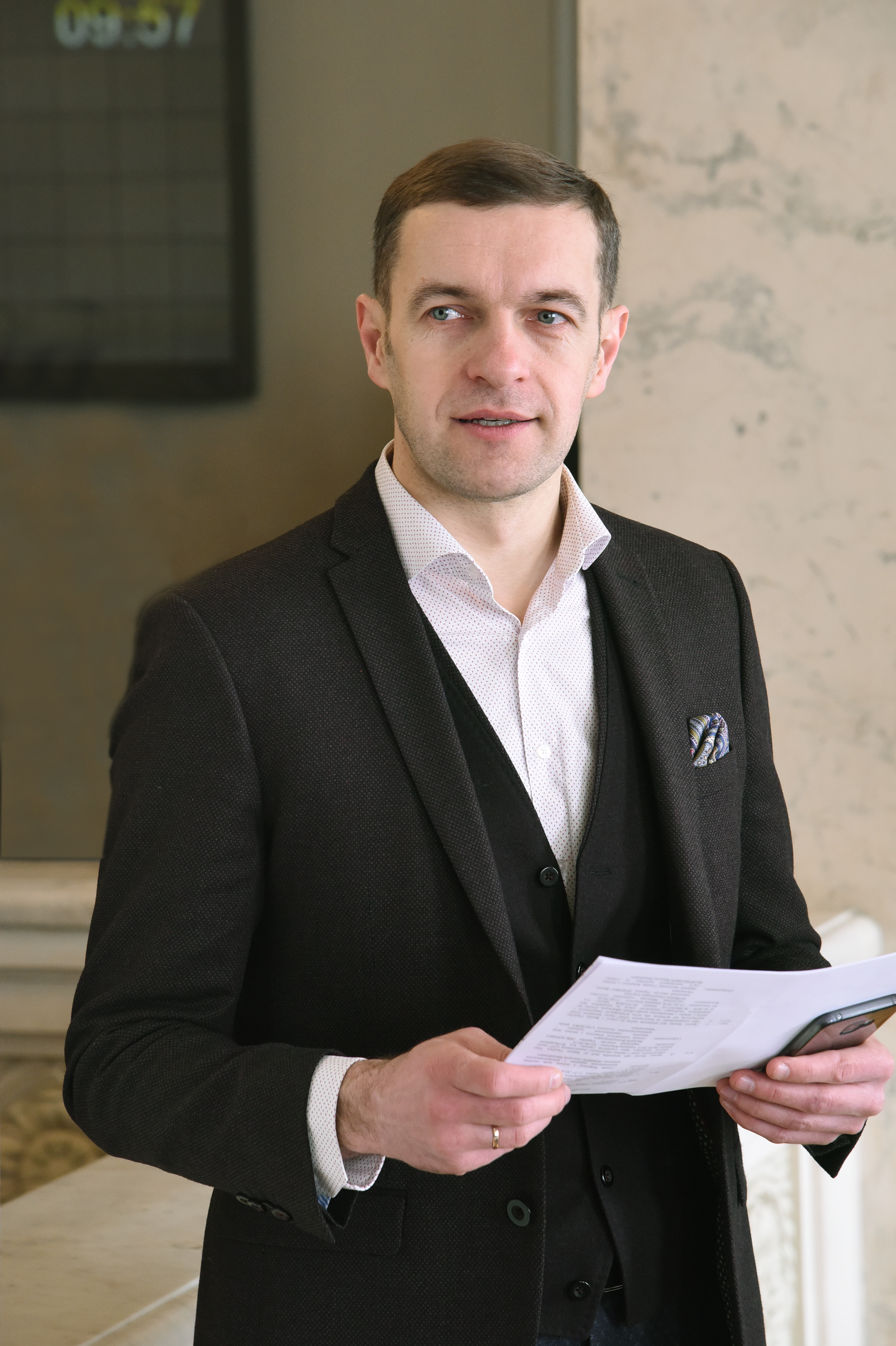

Personal details
- Born: 2 July 1977 (age 49) Bohuslav Town, Kyiv Region, Ukraine
- Party: People's Front
- Education: National Pedagogical Dragomanov University

Hennadii Kryvosheia (Ukrainian: Кривошея Геннадій Григорович; born July 1977, Bohuslav, Kyiv Region) is a Ukrainian politician. A People's Deputy of Ukraine of the VIIIth convocation.

== Education ==
Higher Education, Specialist‚ National Pedagogical Dragomanov University‚ 2002‚ History (History and Law Teacher); Higher. Bohuslav Ivan Nechuy-Levytsky pedagogical college 1997‚ Elementary Education (Elementary School Teacher‚ an organizer of work with pupils’ societies). Languages Knowledge: Ukrainian, Russian – fluently, English – read and translate with a dictionary.

== Labour and political activity ==
After graduating from Boshulav in July 1997, he started attending the National Pedagogical Dragomanov University from which he also graduated from in July 2002. During and after his graduation from Dragomanov, he worked as a promo-manager for the partnership company «Pals-LTD». In November 2003, he started working as a director of the advertising company «Novovyd», which he worked at until January 2004.

In January 2004, he started working as a manager in sales market expansion and simultaneously as Deputy Director for the company «В. І. К. Оil Ukraine». He entered politics in September 2010 by becoming an advisor to the chairman of the executive committee and director of the community receiption office for the political organization Front for Change. He then started working as the chief specialist of the Department of Urban Planning Oversight Department of the Kyiv Institute of the General Plan (which is a communal organization under the executive body of the Kyiv City Council). After a year of doing this, he started working as an assistant and consultant to Leonid Yemets, who served as a People's Deputy of Ukraine in the Verkhovna Rada at the time.

Sometime after this he also served as a deputy of the Podilskyi District Council in the city of Kyiv for its V convocation. On 17 April 2014 he was appointed Head of the Pecherskyi District, which he served as until 15 August. During the 2014 Ukrainian parliamentary election, he ran as a candidate from the People's Front party (which had previously been a nonprofit), which he won. In the Rada, he was the head of the subcommittee on entrepreneurship and technical regulation within the main Committee on Industrial Policy and Entrepreneurship.

In the 2019 Ukrainian parliamentary election Kryvosheia failed as an independent candidate in constituency 93 (in Kyiv Oblast) to get reelected to parliament. He lost this election with 6.60% of the votes to Anna Skorokhod (who won with 43,90% of the votes).

In the 2020 Kyiv local election (set for 25 October 2020) Kryvosheia is a candidate for the Kyiv City Council in Pecherskyi District for For the Future.
