= Oleksandr Shevchenko =

Oleksandr Shevchenko or Olexandr Shevchenko (Ukrainian: Олександр Шевченко) may refer to:

- Oleksandr Shevchenko (politician, born 1937) (Oleksandr Oksentiyovych Shevchenko, 1937–2016), Ukrainian scientist and politician
- Oleksandr Shevchenko (footballer) (Oleksandr Hryhorovych Shevchenko, born 1992), Ukrainian footballer
- Oleksandr Shevchenko (politician, born 1971) (Oleksandr Leonidovych Shevchenko), Ukrainian entrepreneur and politician
- Oleksandr Shevchenko (politician, born 1924) (Oleksandr Tykhonovych Shevchenko, 1924–2021), Soviet and Ukrainian politician

== See also ==
- Alexander Shevchenko (disambiguation)
