= Maksim Shevchenko =

Maksim Shevchenko may refer to:

- Maksim Aleksandrovich Shevchenko (b. 1983), Russian footballer
- Maksim Igorevich Shevchenko (b. 1980), Kazakhstani footballer
- Maksim Leonardovich Shevchenko (b. 1966), Russian journalist and presenter of Channel One
