= Yegor Shevchenko =

Russian footballer

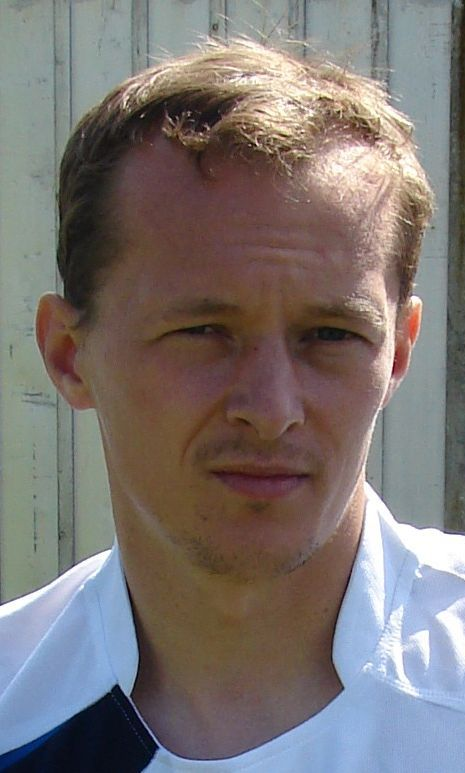

Personal information
- Full name: Yegor Vladimirovich Shevchenko
- Date of birth: 4 February 1978 (age 48)
- Place of birth: Leningrad, Russian SFSR
- Height: 1.74 m (5 ft 8 1/2 in)
- Position: Midfielder

Senior career*
Years	Team	Apps	(Gls)
1995–1999	FC Torpedo Pavlovo	156	(4)
2000–2004	FC Shinnik Yaroslavl	62	(1)
2004	FC Lisma-Mordovia Saransk (loan)	35	(2)
2005	FC Shinnik Yaroslavl	1	(0)
2006	FC Petrotrest St. Petersburg	17	(2)
2007–2009	FC Dynamo St. Petersburg	60	(8)
- * Club domestic league appearances and goals

Yegor Vladimirovich Shevchenko (Russian: Егор Владимирович Шевченко; born 4 February 1978) is a former Russian professional footballer.

== Club career ==
He made his debut in the Russian Premier League in 2002 for FC Shinnik Yaroslavl.
