= Shvets =

Shvets (alternative transliterations: Szwec/Szwiec, Shwets, Schwets, Švets, Švec, Svec, Shwec, Chvets) is a Ukrainian (Швець Shvets) occupational surname literally meaning "cobbler" or "shoemaker". In Russian the word means "tailor" (obsolete). It may also be a phonetic respelling of Czech "Švec".

The surname may refer to:

- Anton Shvets (born 1993), Ukrainian-born Russian footballer
- Fedir Shvets (1882–1940), Ukrainian geologist, public activist and statesman
- Oksana Shvets (1955—2022), Ukrainian actress
- Serhiy Shvets (footballer) (born 1992), Ukrainian footballer
- Serhiy Shvets (politician) (1976–2025), Ukrainian politician
- Yana Shvets (born 1989), Ukrainian singer
- Yuri Pavlovich Shvets (1902–1972), Soviet cinematic artist
- Yuri Shvets (born 1952), former KGB Major
- Mark Švets (born 1976), Estonian international footballer
