= Valentyna Shevchenko =

Valentyna Shevchenko (Ukrainian: Валентина Шевченко) may refer to:

- Valentyna Shevchenko (cross-country skier) (born 1975), Ukrainian cross-country skier
- Valentyna Shevchenko (politician) (1935-2020), Ukrainian politician

== See also ==
- Valentina Shevchenko (born 1988), Kyrgyzstani kickboxer / mixed martial artist
