= NAKO =

Ukrainian Anti-corruption Civil-Society Organisation, focussing on defense

Independent Anti-Corruption Commission
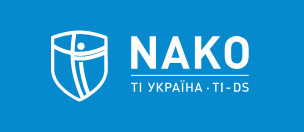
- Abbreviation: NAKO
- Formation: 2016
- Legal status: Charity
- Headquarters: Kyiv, Ukraine
- Secretary General: Olena Tregub
- Main organ: Committee
- Website: https://nako.org.ua/en
- Formerly called: Independent Defence Anti-Corruption Committee (IAC)

The Independent Anti-Corruption Commission (NAKO) is a Ukrainian civil society organization that monitors corruption, advocates for transparency, and upholds accountability in support of Ukraine's national security and sovereignty. Based in Kyiv, NAKO works both within Ukraine and internationally.

== Mission ==
NAKO's mission is to reduce corruption in defense and security sectors by conducting independent research, effective advocacy and informing the public, in order to strengthen Ukraine's defense capabilities. NAKO works with and supports the Ministry of Defense of Ukraine, the Armed Forces of Ukraine, the defense-industrial complex, and key anti-corruption bodies.

== Areas of activity ==
NAKO advocates for reforms in Ukraine's defense procurement system, including the adoption of transparent and competitive bidding processes. NAKO's work has been highlighted in several major international publications, including The New York Times and The Washington Post, for bringing critical changes to Ukraine's military procurement processes, which had long been plagued by inefficiency and corruption.

NAKO's primary areas of activity are:

- defense procurement;
- development of the defense-industrial complex;
- implementation of proper governance in the security and defense sector;
- reduction of secrecy;
- democratic civilian control over the security and defense sector;
- gender equality in the security and defense sector;
- development and implementation of veteran policies;
- sanctions against the Russian Federation (from 2022);
- monitoring corruption risks during war (from 2022).

== Leadership ==
Since October 2017, the organization has been headed by its Secretary General, Olena Tregub. Tregub is the former Director of International Aid Coordination for the Ukrainian Ministry of Economic Development and Trade.

== History and evolution ==
NAKO was established in 2016, initially as the Independent Anti-Corruption Committee on Defense (IAC). It was founded in response to widespread corruption in Ukraine's defense sector, which was widely acknowledged to be undermining both the country's military capabilities and its international standing. The organization was launched in collaboration with Transparency International Ukraine. Over time, as its mandate expanded beyond the defense sector, the committee rebranded itself as the Independent Anti-Corruption Commission (NAKO).

NAKO's broader focus on not just defense but also on public sector governance reforms, legislative advocacy, and civic engagement in anti-corruption activities across various government sectors. The organization's mission aligns with Ukraine's broader goals of integrating into European and NATO security frameworks, which require stringent anti-corruption measures.

In 2019, NAKO became a separate public organization. With the expansion of its mandate, NAKO was renamed as the Independent Anti-Corruption Commission (NAKO).

NAKO was founded in response to widespread corruption in Ukraine's defense sector, which was significantly undermining the country's military capabilities and its international standing. The organization was initially called the Independent Defense Anti-Corruption Committee and was launched in collaboration with Transparency International Ukraine. Over time, as its mandate expanded beyond the defense sector, the committee rebranded itself as the Independent Anti-Corruption Commission (NAKO).

The rebranding was reflective of NAKO's broader focus on not only defense but also on public sector governance reforms, legislative advocacy, and civic engagement in anti-corruption activities across various government sectors. The organization's mission aligns with Ukraine's broader goals of integrating into European and NATO security frameworks, which require stringent anti-corruption measures.

== Committee and board membership ==
In 2016, the IAC Committee included three Ukrainian and three international experts:

- Lieutenant General Tim Evans, former commander of NATO's Joint Rapid Response Corps;
- Drago Kos (co-chairman), former authorized representative for the fight against corruption in Slovenia, former chairman of GRECO;
- James Wasserstrom, Senior Anti-Corruption Advisor at the US Embassy in Kabul, Strategic Advisor and Head of Anti-Corruption, US Special Inspector General for Afghanistan Reconstruction;
- Volodymyr Ogryzko, former Minister of Foreign Affairs, First Deputy Secretary of the National Security Council of Ukraine;
- Oleg Rybachuk (co-chairman), chairman of the Board of Center UA, co-initiator of the "Chesno" movement and former Vice-Prime Minister for European Integration and Head of the Presidential Administration;
- Sevgil Musaeva, editor-in-chief of the online publication Ukrainian Pravda.

In April 2019, Lieutenant General Michel Yakovlev and Yulia Marushevska joined the Committee. Yulia joined as a new Ukrainian Member of the Committee, replacing Sevgil Musaieva, who became a Board Member.

As of September 2024, the members of NAKO's board are:

- Sevgil Musaeva, editor-in-chief of Ukrainian Pravda;
- Giovanni Kessler, Italian lawyer and prosecutor, former director general of the European Anti-Fraud Office (OLAF);
- Andrii Borovyk, executive director of TI Ukraine;
- Andrew Bain, US Marine Corps Reserve Colonel, president of Atlantic Group Limited.
- Larry Henderson, Vice President and Head of Analytic Intelligence at Arcanum Global.

== Research, publications and reports ==
NAKO conducts research and regularly publishes reports and white papers on corruption risks and governance issues in Ukraine and internationally. These publications have been featured in major global media outlets, and are used by policymakers both within Ukraine and internationally to guide reform efforts. NAKO's main research, publications and reports are:

- 30 May 2017: Making the system work: enhancing security assistance to Ukraine
- 14 September 2017: Just what the doctor ordered? Corruption Risks in the System of Medical Supply in the Ministry of Defenсe of Ukraine
- 28 November 2017: Crossing the line: how the illegal trade with occupied Donbas has undermined defence integrity
- 15 August 2018: Secrecy and Transparency: Striking the Right Balance in the Defence Sector
- 11 September 2018: Six Red Flags: The Most Frequent Corruption Risks in Ukraine’s Defence Procurement
- 25 October 2018: Poor Governance and Corruption Inside Ukraine’s Defence Housing System: Risks and Recommendations
- 16 September 2019: Reforming the State Defence Order. A Brief.
- 12 October 2020: MoD State-Owned Enterprises: How to Overcome Corruption and Inefficiency?
- 14 March 2021: Corruption in the Real Estate Sector of the Ministry of Defence: Risks and Recommendations
- 26 March 2021: Corporate governance reform in Ukraine’s defence industry: from initiative to implementation
- 28 February 2023: Enabling War Crimes? Western-Made Components in Russia's War Against Ukraine
- 6 June 2023: Discrimination of various social groups in the Ukrainian Armed Forces
- 3 July 2023: Terror in the Details: Western-made Components in Russia's Shahed-136 Attacks
- 6 July 2023: An interdisciplinary study Invisible Battalion 5.0.
- 1 August 2023: Globalization, Weaponized: Foreign Components in Weapons and Equipment Used by the Russian Army
- 4 March 2024: Sociological study "Access to Military Education for Women in Ukraine" (abridged version)
- 13 June 2024: Wings of War: Analysing the Western Parts in Russian Fighter Jets

== Financing ==
NAKO works with the support of both international donors and individual donations. Its activities are supported by, amongst others:

- British Foreign, Commonwealth & Development Office (FCDO),
- U.S. Agency for International Development (USAID);
- National Endowment for Democracy (NED)

Donors who previously supported NAKO projects include:

- International Renaissance Foundation (IRF);
- Ministry of Foreign Affairs of the Netherlands;
- Ministry for Foreign Affairs (Sweden);
- French Embassy in Ukraine;
- EU Anti-Corruption Initiative (EUACI).

== Impact ==
NAKO's work has been recognized by international organizations, including NATO and the European Union, as essential for Ukraine's integration into Western defense and security frameworks. Time Magazine has noted NAKO's role in fostering international trust and cooperation, which is critical for Ukraine's geopolitical positioning.
