= Byron Shefchik =

American swimmer (born 1974)

Personal information
- Born: 1974 (age 51–52)

Sport
- Sport: Swimming
- Strokes: Breaststroke
Medal record
Representing United States
Summer Universiade
Bronze medal – third place	1997 Sicily	200m breaststroke

William Byron Shefchik, III, born in 1974, is the only current male member of the Brigham Young University (BYU) Swimming and Diving Team to be elected into the BYU Hall of Fame. Shefchik was a five-time All-American and three-time Academic All-American during his time at BYU. He graduated from BYU with his MBA in 2000 and works for Rich Products as a Senior Marketing Manager in Jacksonville, FL.

== BYU career ==
1992–1993 — Freshman Year

Shefchik was a recipient of academic scholarship at BYU. Despite multiple swimming awards in High School, he was not recruited for the BYU Swim team and joined as a walk on. He placed third in the 200 breast and 11th in the 400 IM at the WAC Championships and earned Academic All-WAC status as a freshman with a 3.98 GPA. He placed second in the 400 IM and first in the 200 breast at NMSU, second in the 200 breast vs. UNLV, second in the 200 IM vs. Utah in Provo, first in the 200 breast vs. Air Force and first in the 200 IM and first in the 100 breast vs. Wyoming.

1993–1994 — Sophomore Year

Shefchik recorded good times for the Cougars as a sophomore before leaving for a two-year LDS mission to Costa Rica.

1996–1997 — Junior Year

After a two year break, Shefchik was quickly back in the water and became Academic All-WAC, Collegiate Swim Coaches Academic All-America and CoSIDA District VIII Academic All-America. He won the WAC title in the 100 and 200 breast and was on the second-team All-American in 200 breast (ninth) and 100 breast (10th). He set an NCAA Championship time of 1:56.82 in 200 breast (2:17.07) at U.S. National Championships. Despite injuries, he won the bronze medal in the 200 breast Swimming at the 1997 Summer Universiade in Sicily. Shefchik was U.S. Swimming All-America that year and set records at BYU in the 100 breast (54.75), 200 breast (1:56.82) and 400 medley relay (3:19.51).

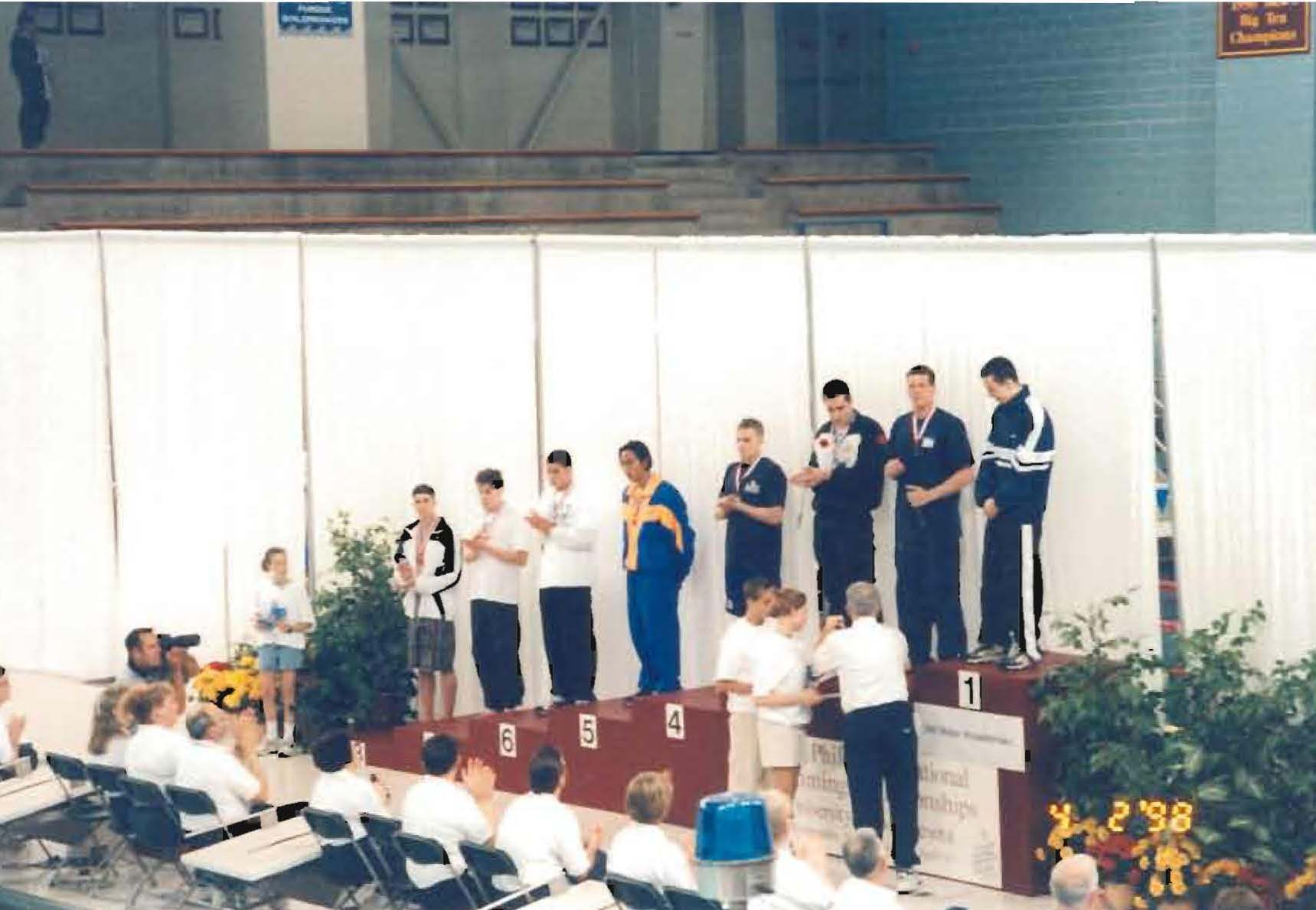
1998 Spring US Nationals

1997–1998 — Senior Year

Tallied 17 first place wins during the season in events such as the 100 and 200 breast, 100 fly, 100 back, 200 and 400 IM, 200 medley and 400 medley. Shefchik competed at WAC Championships, where he placed first in both 100 and 200 breast. At the NCAA Championships, he placed fourth in the 200 breast, 13th in the 100 breast and 16th in the 200 IM. He was named both First and Second Team All-American.

Awards

Was inducted into the BYU Athletic Hall of Fame in 2008, still the only Men's Swimming Athlete to be in the Hall of Fame.

Records

Shefchik still holds the All-time records at BYU for the 200-Yard Breaststroke and as part of the 400 Medley Relay team.

== Today ==
Shefchik is back in the water and training for health and new races. He swam in the BYU alumni meet and finished first in the 100 Breast.

Shefchik set two records for his age group in the Georgia Masters: 57.75 in the 100 Breast and 2:05.47 in the 200 Breast.
