= Yurii Hudymenko =

Ukrainian journalist, activist, and politician (born 1987)

- Юрій Гудименко
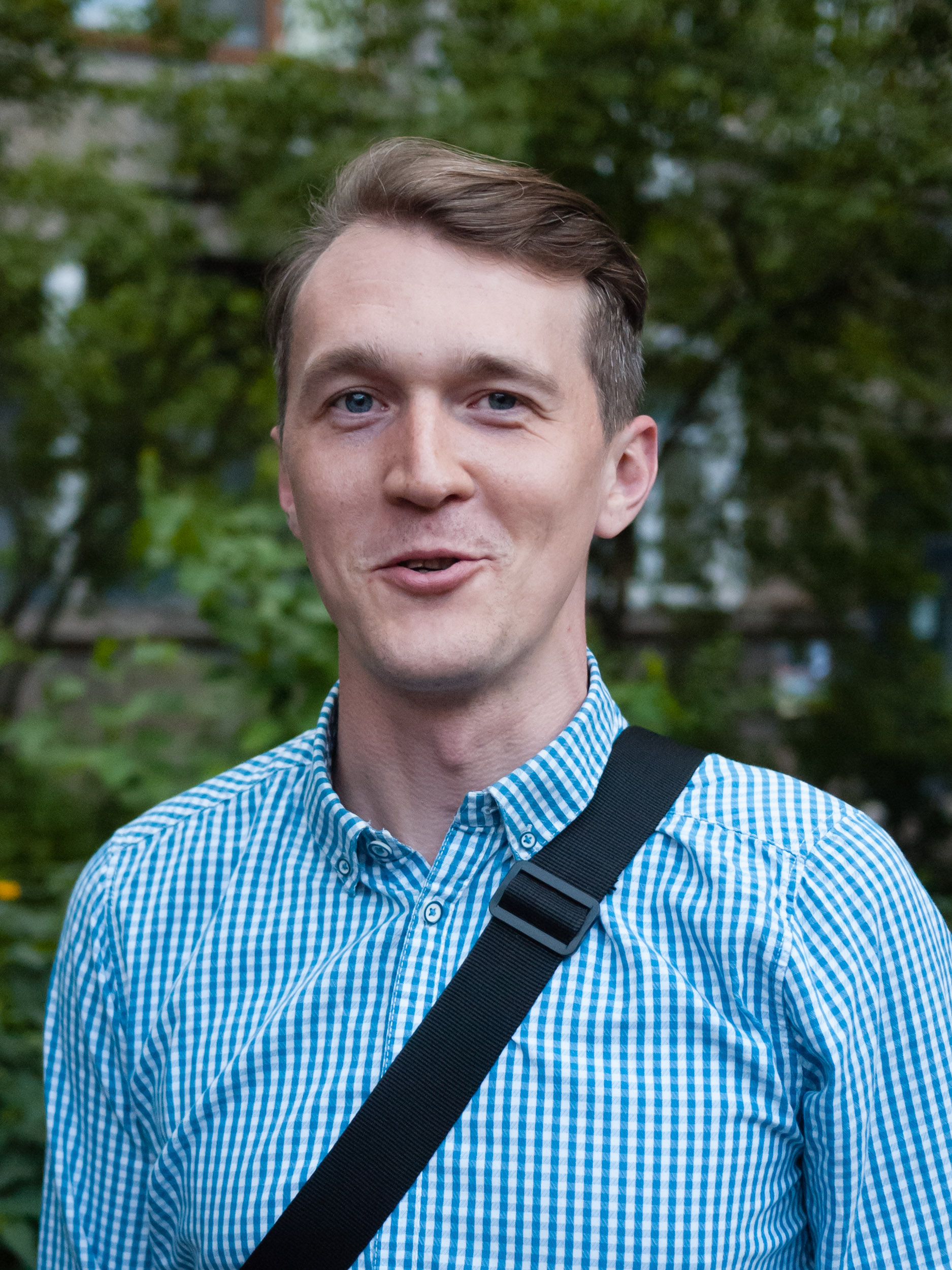
- Hudymenko in 2019
- Born: 14 December 1987 (age 38); Zaporizhzhia, Ukrainian SSR, Soviet Union (now Ukraine)
- Occupations: Politician, journalist, blogger
- Awards: Order for Courage 3d class

Yurii Volodymyrovych Hudymenko (Ukrainian: Юрій Володимирович Гудименко; born 14 December 1987) is a Ukrainian politician. He is leader of the "Demokratychna Sokyra" movement. He participated in the Russo-Ukrainian War as commander of a military engineer detachment with the rank of junior sergeant (corporal).

He had been a political prisoner, journalist and blogger. He holds a master’s degree from the Zaporizhzhia National University in history with teaching qualification.

On September 6, 2022, Yurii was awarded the Order for Courage 3rd class for personal courage in defending state sovereignty and territorial integrity of Ukraine, according to President Volodymyr Zelenskiy's decree №627/2022. On September 28, 2022, Yuriy was awarded the Commander-in-Chief's Honor «Steel Cross».

== Activism ==
- In 2008 he became involved in activism and the political process.
- In 2010 he served as deputy head of a political party in Zaporizhzhia.
- In 2011 he was sentenced to two years in prison (sentence suspended) for defacing the monument to Dzerzhynsky with a bucket of paint (Dzerzhynski was one of the founders of the All-Russian Extraordinary Commission (Cheka) and organizer of the "Red Terror").
- Gudymenko was an aide to the leader of the Zaporizhzhia Euromaidan.
- As a participant in Euromaidan rallies in Zaporizhzhia, he was beaten up during January 26, 2014, violent dispersal of the protest by the police.
- In 2014, after the Revolution of Dignity, the Zhovtnevy district court of Zaporizhzhia amnestied Gudymenko among with other pro-Ukrainian activists wrongfully judged during the Yanukovych regime per request of Prosecutor General of Ukraine.
- In 2014 he initiated the "Operation Butterfly" website – one of the first databases containing information on separatists.
- In 2016–2017 he headed the campaign department for a Ukrainian political party.

== Political activity ==
In Spring 2018 he co-founded the Demokratychna Sokyra party, along with other major Ukrainian bloggers and influencers sharing his ideas. The party’s ideology is based on the ideas of classical liberalism, aimed at supporting economic deregulation, strengthening the military and defending human rights (being the only party consistently supporting LGBTQ+ rights, sex workers' rights, and the right to self-defence), combined with a strong pro-European, pro-American, pro-NATO, anti-Russian and anti-communist position.

Ran in the 2020 Kyiv local election as the 1st candidate in the Demokratychna Sokyra list, with Yulia Payevska (Taira) as 2nd.

As a political council member, Gudymenko is responsible for PR and public rallies. Thus, he organised and took part in numerous protest campaigns, bringing public attention to the problems in Ukraine and helped achieve key decisions for the state and the society, such as:

- Demokratychna Sokyra was one of the initiators and organisers for the "No to capitulation!" campaign against implementing the political part of the Minsk agreements and concessions for Russia. Afterwards, the party organised multiple protests against the soft-on-Russia policies of president Volodymyr Zelenskyy throughout 2020;
- Human rights campaigns for legalisation of medical cannabis, gun rights, medical and education reform.
- Consistent campaigns protesting attempts made by Ihor Kolomoyskiy and other Ukrainian oligarchs, like Dmytro Firtash and Rinat Akhmetov, to use their influence on the state and courts to obtain decisions, more preferable for their businesses;
- protests against pro-Russian media influence;
- campaign calling for impeachment of president Volodymyr Zelenskyy and firing the Office of the President Head Andrii Yermak for their actions in 2021, considered by the party to be dangerously soft on Russia and corruption in the state, with some calling them treasonous.

In late 2022, Hudymenko filed a claim with the Office of Prosecutor General, which used it to open criminal proceedings for high treason (p. 111 of the Ukraine Criminal Code), passing it onto the State Bureau of Investigation to investigate all MPs from the pro-Russian OPZZh party parliament fraction.

In January 2023, Hudymenko's petition №22/174786-еп, demanding to introduce clear markings for brands selling products in the Russian Federation reached 30000 signatures.

== Journalist ==
- In 2011 he worked as a journalist for Subota Plus local Zaporizhzhia newspaper.
- In 2012 he served as head for the news department of the regional "TV-Gold" TV channel.
- In 2013 he worked as editor in chief for Mriya newspaper
- He authored a number of investigative pieces.
- In 2016 he became the co-founder of the Forpost news website
- In 2015 he moved to Kyiv, where he worked briefly with TSN, Focus, Petro and Mazepa and other news outlets. He volunteered for a weekly historical radio program on military "Armiya. FM" radio.
- In 2018–2019 he worked as anchor for Blogpost and Blogpost: Hate Night Show TV program.
- As of March, 2023, his total follower count across all platforms reaches 300 thousand people.
- According to ICTV, he is in the TOP-10 of Ukrainian bloggers (8th in 2018).

== Russo-Ukrainian War involvement ==
After the 2022 Russian invasion, Hudymenko enlisted. He served as a military engineer (sapper) unit commander with the 130th Territorial Defense Battalion of the Armed Forces of Ukraine. Hudymenko met the Russian invasion of Ukraine in Mariupol, on base of the 503rd Separate Marine Battalion. After joining up with his Territorial Defence unit, Yurii fought in the Battle of Kyiv, particularly in the liberation of Irpin and Bucha, as well as battles in the Donetsk and Kharkiv regions.

On June 27, 2022, he was heavily wounded in action in Dementiyivka near Kharkiv. Receiving multiple mine fragments to his left leg, right arm, and lungs, Yurii was evac'd to hospital barely staying alive.

After spending 4 months in the hospital, Hudymenko is still currently recovering, with him regaining his ability to walk (although slowly), and his right arm being still disabled.

== Book ==
In 2023, Hudymenko published a volume titled Stories and Wars (Ukrainian: Історії та війни), a 416-page hardcover collection of essays, speeches, and historical sketches he wrote over the years, including content written during his hospitalization. The book received significant attention across Ukraine: Hudymenko conducted nationwide presentations and signings.

== Awards ==
- On September 6, 2022, Yurii was awarded the Order for Courage 3rd class for personal courage in defending state sovereignty and territorial integrity of Ukraine, according to President Volodymyr Zelenskiy's decree №627/2022.
- On September 28, 2022, Yuriy was awarded the Commander-in-Chief Valerii Zaluzhnyi's Honor «Steel Cross».
- Commander-in-Chief of the Armed Forces of Ukraine “Golden Cross”.
- Medal “For Wounds” (Ministry of Defence).

== Public service and anti-corruption oversight ==
In January 2025, Hudymenko was elected head of the Public Anti-Corruption Council at Ukraine’s Ministry of Defence, a 15-member advisory body selected through a nationwide online vote. During the election he received the highest result – 65,222 votes (with ~100,000 people participating).

He publicly highlighted the case of substandard 120-mm mortar rounds being supplied to the front. In this case, the director of the Pavlohrad Chemical Plant was arrested.

In an interview with Espreso, he outlined key corruption risks in the defence sector and emphasized the need to reform existing procurement principles. He advocated “formula-based procurement,” a transition that would reduce the scope for abuses.

As chair, he has publicly highlighted governance risks stemming from the merger of the Ministry of Defence and the Ministry of Strategic Industries, warning that the concentration of contracting, production, quality control and acceptance functions within one ministry creates systemic corruption risks. Hudymenko publicly criticizes the Ministry of Defence’s ineffective structure and advocates institutional reforms. In July 2025, following a six-month functional audit conducted by the Public Anti-Corruption Council at the Ministry of Defence, Hudymenko announced that the audit identified about 3,000–3,500 redundant positions within the Ministry.

As head of the Public Anti-Corruption Council, in 2025 Hudymenko has voiced strong criticism of the draft law package known as Defence City, designed to create a special legal regime for the defence industry. In particular, he denounced bill No.13423 as containing “corruption-prone” provisions. Following public debate, the most controversial articles were removed in bill No. 13423-2 and the package was sent for further revision.

== Veterans’ support initiatives ==
Since 2023, he has been involved with the Ukrainian Foundation Mriya, a nonprofit providing humanitarian, legal and educational support to families of fallen and missing defenders, prisoners of war and civilian detainees.

In 2023, Hudymenko proposed the creation of a national flag to commemorate missing and captured defenders of Ukraine. According to his initiative, the flag should be raised over major government institutions until the last prisoner of war or missing soldier returns home.

In January 2024, Hudymenko initiated a veterans’ appeal to the United States Congress, urging expedited financial assistance to Ukraine.

Hudymenko has been cited among public advocates of the idea “Wounded Service Member’s Kit”, an initiative to provide wounded soldiers at stabilization points and in hospitals with a special set of adaptive clothing and hygiene items. In 2025 the Ministry of Defence launched the program.

== Media presence ==
According to Forbes Ukraine, Hudymenko is one of the TOP-10 Ukrainian blogger-servicemen by overall followers.

As of March, 2023, Hudymenko's follower count amounts to 340,000 followers across such platforms as Facebook, Instagram, Twitter, Telegram, and YouTube. Yuriy's posts on history and politics have reached great heights in the past years. His videos from the early stages of the war, especially from February 25, are still remembered in social media.
