= Švec =

Švec (feminine Švecová) is a Czech surname (meaning literally shoemaker). It may refer to:

- Denis Švec (born 1996), Slovak footballer
- František Švec, Czech canoer
- Jakub Švec (born 2000), Slovak footballer
- Jan G. Švec (born 1966), Czech voice scientist
- Jiří Švec (1935–2014), Czech wrestler
- Josef Jiří Švec (1883–1918), Czech military officer of Czechoslovak Legion
- Josef Švec (born 1935), Czech rower
- Jozef Švec (born 1995), Slovak hockey player
- Marek Švec (wrestler) (born 1973), Czech wrestler
- Martin Švec (football player) (born 1984), Czech footballer
- Martin Švec (squash player) (born 1994), Czech squash player
- Michal Švec (born 1987), Czech footballer
- Otakar Švec (1892–1955), Czech sculptor
- Valér Švec (born 1935), Slovak footballer
