= Stock exchanges in Ukraine =

Stock exchanges in Ukraine are stock exchanges based in Ukraine. Stock exchanges really surfaced by the end of the 1990s, but it was not until the Orange Revolution when stock market in Ukraine showed a noticeable growth. As of 2020, a number of stock exchanges in Ukraine were owned by Russians.

== Market description ==
According to the classification of Standard and Poor's, the securities market in Ukraine is defined as the Frontier Market (see Credit rating). The class includes some 20 countries across the globe, among which are several neighbors of Ukraine (most of them member of the European Union such as Romania, Bulgaria, Baltic states and others. In 2011 the Standard & Poor's gave Ukraine the lowest investment grade of B along with such countries as Belarus, Bosnia and Albania.

The biggest stock exchange that proved itself well in 2005 was the PFTS Stock Exchange. It is also recognized as one by the S&P. Based in Kyiv, in 2005 the stock exchange owned some 86% of market contracts in Ukraine. In 2011 the National Rating Agency of Ukraine "Rurik" composed an analytic review of stock market in Ukraine based on the report of the National Commission on Securities and Exchange "Ukrainian stock market in 2011: confidence, stability and growth" (Ukrainian: Український фондовий ринок у 2011 році: впевненість, стійкість та зростання). According to the review 98% of all contracts are concentrated at three stock exchanges of Ukraine: PFTS, Perspective, and Ukrainian Exchange (UX). And if in 2010 PFTS owned almost 50% of all trading, 2011 it yielded the some volume of trading to Perspective and UX yet still staying as a leading stock exchange in the country.

== History ==
The first stock exchange was Ukrainian Stock Exchange created in 1991 with the help of $5 million grant from the French government. The same year parliament adopted the Law of Ukraine "About securities and stock exchange". In 1994 the Presidential decree "About investment funds and investment companies". Next year there was established the State Commission in securities and stock market that sets regulations on securities trading (similar to U.S. Securities and Exchange Commission). In 1996 there was created electronic trade system, PFTS. Next year the private sector established a common depositary "Inter-regional Stock Union".

== List of stock exchanges ==
- Ukrainian Stock Exchange
- Kyiv International Stock Exchange
- Ukrainian Interbank Currency Exchange
- Ukrainian Universal Exchange

== List of trade-information systems ==
- PFTS Stock Exchange
- South-Ukrainian Trade Information System
- Perspectiva Stock Exchange

== Popular indices ==
- PFTS index
- KP-Dragon
- UX Index
- UAI-50
