= PFTS index =

Stock market index

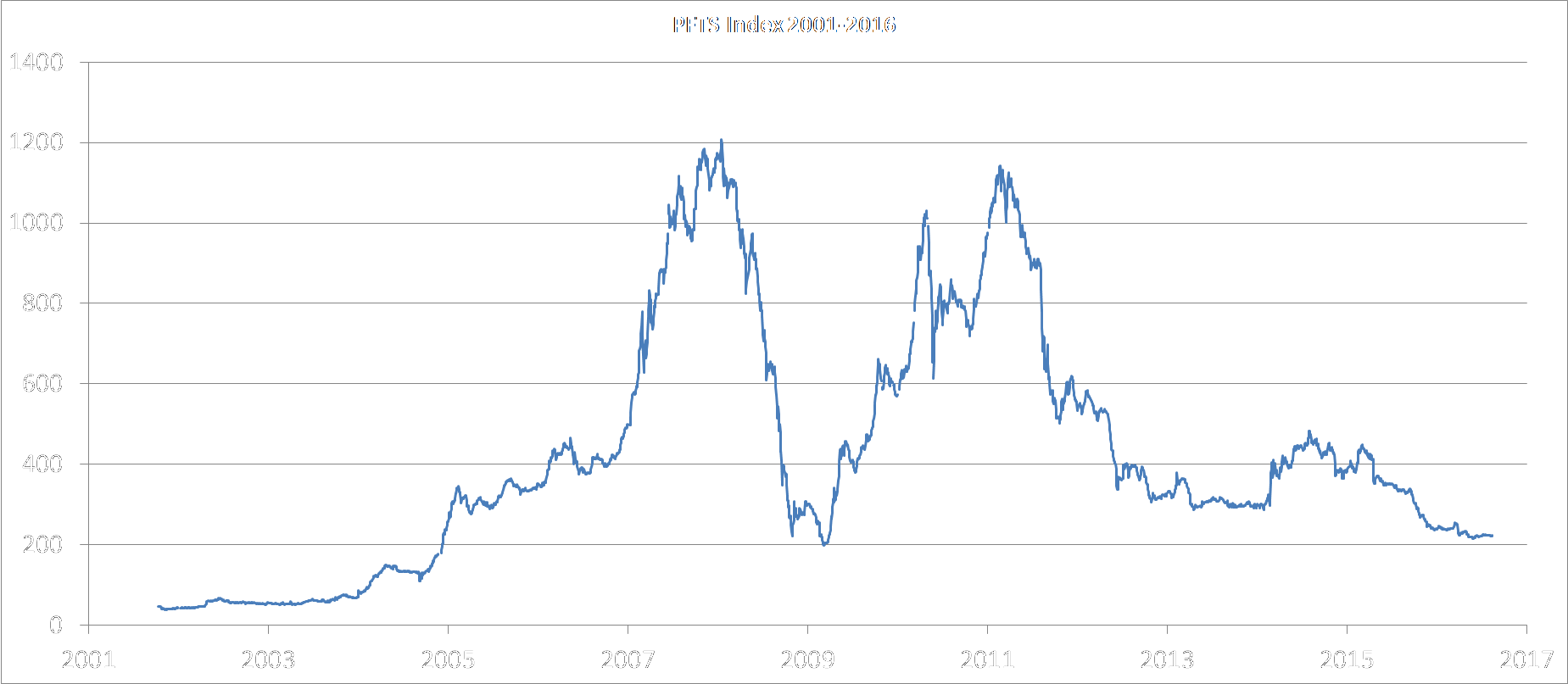
The Ukrainian stock index PFTS 2001–2016.

PFTS index is a benchmark index of PFTS Ukraine Stock Exchange, Ukraine's leading bourse. Beside PFTS Index, there are also the UX Index of the Ukrainian Exchange and the Ukrainian Average Index 50 (UAI-50) being composed by analysts of internet-publisher fundmarket.ua.

PFTS Index was effectively created on October 1, 1997, as a capitalization-weighted index to track the percentage change of the basket of stocks from base period – i.e., from October, 1997. As of today it remains the only index of Ukrainian stocks to be recognized and closely tracked by the international financial community.

Many companies included in PFTS Index specialize in raw materials extraction and processing, therefore heavily exposing the Index to the fluctuations of world commodities' prices. The Index is also disproportionately weighted towards industry sector of the economy. As of July 28, 2009, the total weight of industry firms in PFTS Index was 52.75%, with the rest (47.22%) accounted for by the services sector, thereby leaving agricultural sector unrepresented in the index. ^{[a]}

PFTS Index Basket
N	Ticker	Company Name	Industry	Date of Entrance to PFTS Listing^{[b]}	Free Float, %
1	ALMK	Alchevsk Metallurgical Combine (ISD)	Basic Materials	March, 2005	3,87
2	BAVL	Raiffeisen Bank Aval (Raiffeisen)	Financials	December, 2004	1,72
3	CEEN	Centerenergo	Utilities	unknown	21,71
4	DNEN	Dniproenergo	Utilities	September, 1997	1,89
5	DOEN	Donbasenergo	Utilities	September, 1997	14,14
6	KVBZ	Krukivka Carriage Works (Kremenchuk city)	Industrials	November, 2006	5,00
7	MSICH	Motor Sich	Industrials	September, 1997	20,00
8	UNAF	Ukrnafta	Oil & Gas	September, 1997	8,00
9	UTLM	Ukrtelecom	Telecom	November, 2002	7,14
10	ZAEN	Zakhidenergo	Utilities	September, 1997	5,00

== History ==
Major events:

- 2003

In November, 2003, the PFTS Board adopted the amendments to the Rules of Calculation of PFTS Index whereby only the prices of securities in a free-float would be taken into account upon index calculation, excluding stock holdings which are in state ownership. These changes, which, in essence, substantially increased the influence of securities issued by privatized companies' on the index value, took effect in January of next year.

- 2004

During Orange revolution, the calculation of PFTS Index was suspended for 10 days – the longest pause in its history – due to sharp fall in liquidity induced by political instability.

- 2005

In July a special Committee was created to oversee the calculation of all PFTS Indices^{[c]} in order to ensure their maximum conformity with market conditions. Same month the calculation methodology was enhanced further. Effective since August, the newly introduced changes expanded the list of stocks that are excluded from index calculation. In addition to state-owned stock (excluded in 2003), all the securities held by the issuer of that stock or in possession of strategic investors or company's management or employees are not taken into account upon index calculation.

- 2006

The trading of Zaporizhstal shares is suspended in April due to high price volatility generated by the uncertainty over the positions of its minor and major shareholders. The company stock was subsequently removed from the index basket. Next month the basket was broadened to include the shares of Raiffeisen Bank Aval and Luhanskteplovoz (the former company, however, was later excluded). It expanded further during the rest of the year, incorporating the shares of Poltava Ore Mining and Processing Plant, Sumy Frunze Machine Building Plant and that of Ukrsotsbank. By November, the basket consisted of 14 securities.

- 2007

Azovstal Iron and Steel Works, Ilyich Iron and Steel Works and Mariupol Heavy Machinebuilding Plant join PFTS index basket, bringing the total number of tracked securities to 17. Three months later, on June 13, the index tops 1,000-point milestone. In August, the basket of stocks grew to 18, with the addition of Motor Sich.

- 2008

The stocks of two more companies – Avdiivka Cokery Plant and Enakievo Metallurgical Plant – are included in the index calculation in February, bringing the total number of tracked securities to 20. In October more changes to the index basket take place as the shares of Donbasenergo and Luhanskteplovoz are replaced with that of Alchevsk Metallurgical Plant and Krukivsky Carriage Works.

- 2009

A new trading system called PFTS NEXT is launched in April. Same month, PFTS index posts 49.5% growth, the biggest monthly rise ever recorded. Index climbs 80.87% in second quarter of 2009, the best rally among 93 stock benchmark measures tracked by Bloomberg. In July, the number of client accounts tops 700 as more private investors enter the market. Two months later, the first Repo transaction on government securities takes place on PFTS NEXT. In nine months to the end of September, PFTS Index climbs more than 70%, which placed it 2nd among world markets in terms of growth rate.

- 2010

Members of index committee decide that the shares of Sumy Frunze Machine Building Plant do not meet the criteria for index shares and decide to replace them with more liquid stock of Stahanov Car Production Facility.

== Market statistics ==
Records^{[d]}

Milestone	Closing Level	Date
100	101.87	February 17, 2004
200	202.48	December 7, 2004
300	303.93	January 14, 2005
400	407.91	February 15, 2006
500	507.92	January 10, 2007
1,000	1,000.00	June 13, 2007
1,100	1,117.83	July 25, 2007
1,200	1,208.61	January 15, 2008
Highest close	1,208.61	January 15, 2008

Total annual returns

Year	Annual Return	UAH1.00 Investment Gives	5 Year Annualized Return (g/i)=(1+ar)^5
2002	33.41%	1.33	–
2003	57.91%	2.11	–
2004	227.08%	6.89	–
2005	32.47%	9.13	–
2006	44.37%	13.18	67.48%
2007	135.91%	31.09	87.71%
2008	−74.02%	8.08	30.84%
2009	89.76%	15.33	17.34%
2010	65.63%	25.38	22.70%
High	227.08%		87.71%
Low	-74.02%		17.34%
Median	57.91%		30.84%
CAGR	38.72%		

== Notes ==
a. When calculating the shares, the following sector breakdown was assumed: 1. Industry sector – Basic Materials, Industrials and Oil & Gas; 2. Services sector – Financials, Utilities and Telecom.

b. The dates provided show when the company became listed on the broader stock exchange and not when it became part of the narrower PFTS Index basket.

c. By that time included Ukrainian corporate bonds market indices, created in October, 2004 in cooperation with Cbonds, a fixed income market news agency.

d. These are the closing milestones of PFTS Index in 100-point increments, along with the all-time highs.

== See also ==
- PFTS Ukraine Stock Exchange
- List of stock market indices
