= Mykolaivka, Donetsk Oblast =

City in Donetsk Oblast, Ukraine

Mykolaivka Миколаївка
- City
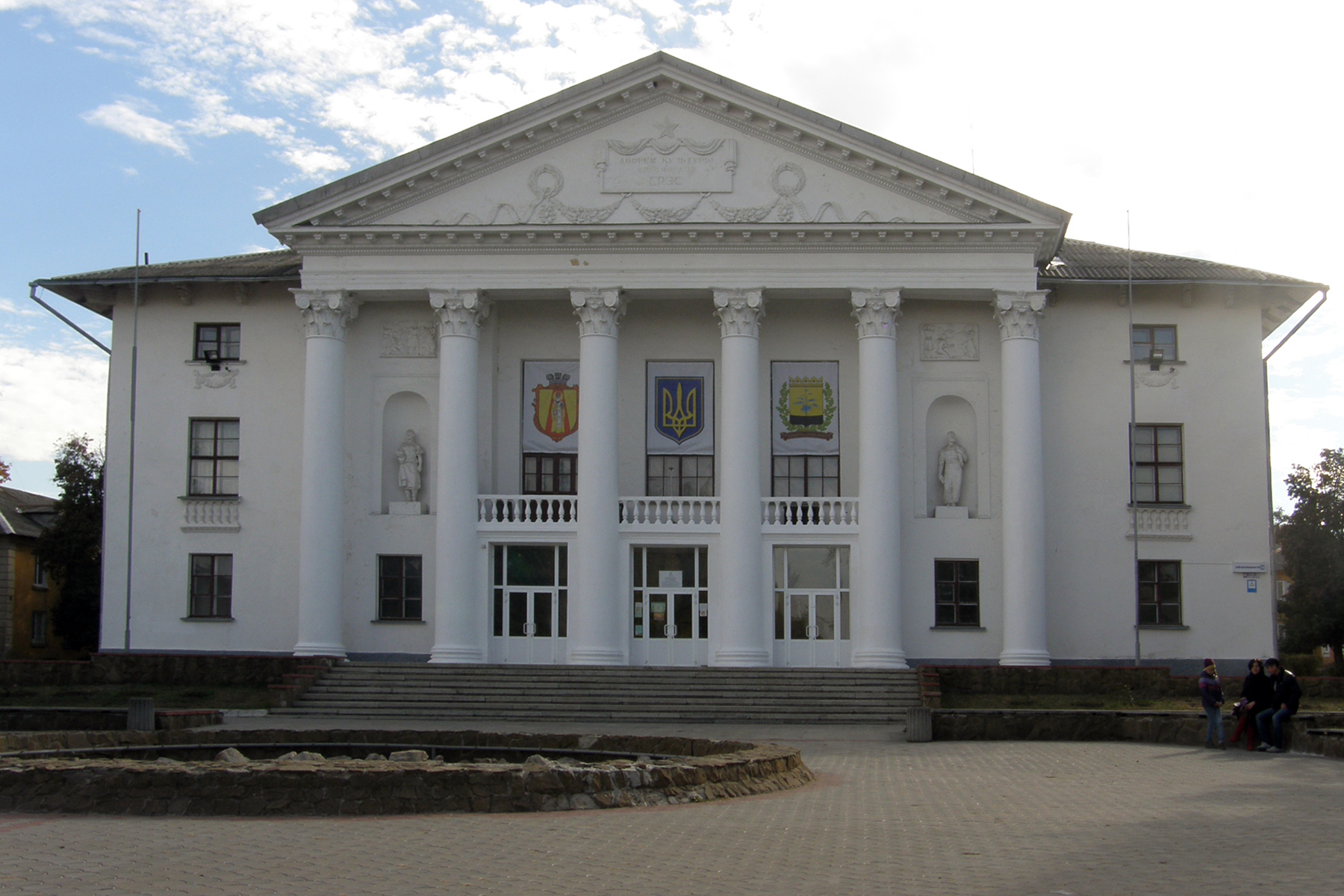
- Sloviansk TPP club.

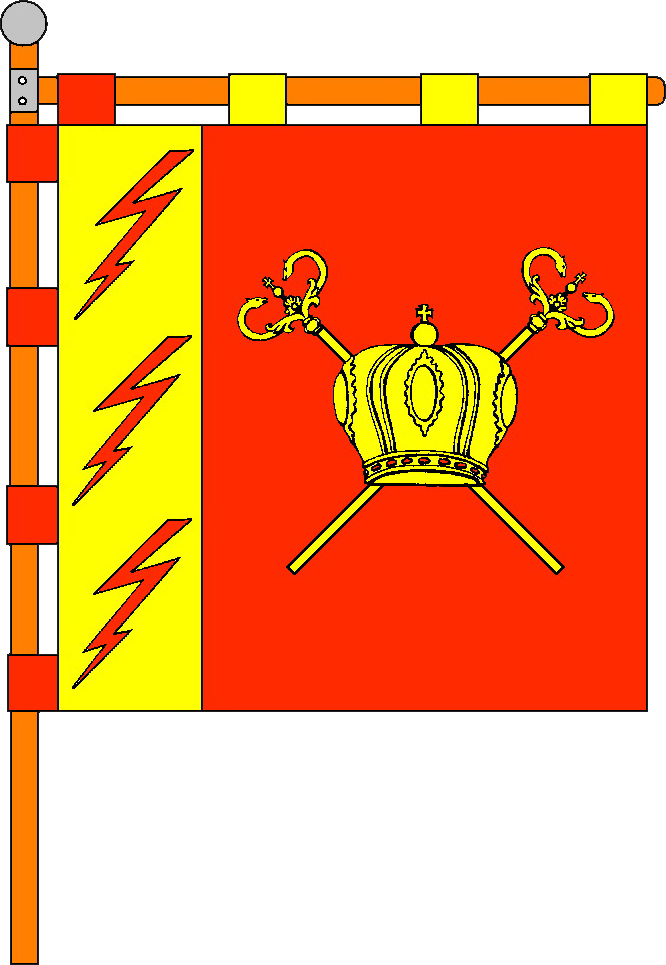
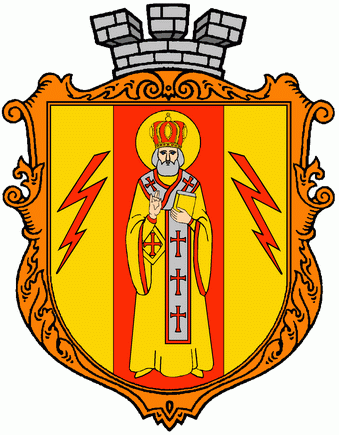
- Flag Seal
- Interactive map of Mykolaivka
- Location within Donetsk Oblast Location within Ukraine
- Coordinates: 48.8521°N 37.7740°E
- Country: Ukraine
- Oblast: Donetsk Oblast
- Raion: Kramatorsk Raion
- Hromada: Mykolaivka urban hromada
- First mentioned: 18th century
- City rights: 2003

Area
  - Total: 6.5 km^{2} (2.5 sq mi)
- Elevation: 75 m (246 ft)

Population (2022)
  - Total: 14,210
  - Estimate (July 2026): 709
  - Density: 2,200/km^{2} (5,700/sq mi)
- Postal code: 84180-84182
- Area code: +380-6262
- Website: http://mykolaivka-rada.gov.ua/

Mykolaivka (Ukrainian: Миколаївка, pronounced [mɪkoˈlɑjiu̯kɐ]; Russian: Николаевка, romanized: Nikolayevka) is a city and administrative centre of Mykolaivka urban hromada in Kramatorsk Raion, Donetsk Oblast, Ukraine to the south of the railway station Elektrychna. The city is most known for being the home of the Sloviansk Thermal Power Plant, where it is a major employer of local residents. The population estimate is about 14,210 (2022 estimate). It is located in the historic region of Sloboda Ukraine.

== Geography ==
Mykolaivka is located near the Seversky Donets River, 20 km east of Sloviansk and 12 km from the Kozhushko railway station Sloviansk – Lyman line. The physical distance to Kyiv is 528 km. A railway line from Sloviansk serves the city, serving and supplying the Sloviansk Thermal Power Plant. The Elektricheskaya railway station, a non-passenger railway station, operates.

== History ==
The settlement was founded in the first half of the 18th century in 1730. It was the property of Danila Bystritsky, the Izyum wagon regiment. In 1732, Bystritsky's estate included 18 households, 34 huts, and 83 souls. According to church records and legend, the river, located approximately 15–16 km from Slavyansk, flowed into the Seversky Donets River, which was very turbulent and, flowing out of ravines and hillocks composed of red clay, eroded the turf banks. This gave the river and the settlement their name, Krasny Byk.

The settlement of Krasny Byk grew into a sloboda, a village, and by the end of the 18th century, it had 397 households and approximately two thousand people of both sexes. According to legend, one of the settlers found an icon depicting St. Nicholas. A chapel was built in the village, and the icon of St. Nicholas was placed there. After some time, the settlement of Krasny Byk was renamed Nikolaevka, after the chapel of St. Nicholas. The chapel with the icon of St. Nicholas, according to legend, was moved to the church newly built in 1748. It was subsequently rebuilt several times, consecrated by clergy, and the village became a full-fledged settlement and parish.

In 1903, Pyotr Petrovich Semenov-Tyan-Shansky wrote about Nikolaevka: "All the clay from the Nikolaevka deposit is of high quality and is used by potters not only in the nearby village, but also in many villages 10 miles away." In 1900, the Slavic manufacturer Essen built a porcelain factory on the colored clay deposits between Nikolaevka and Rai-Aleksandrovka, employing many Nikolaev residents. In 1910, a pottery school was established in Nikolaevka, with four masters teaching about 70 students.

After the overthrow of the Provisional Government of Russia, a zemstvo was organized in Nikolaevka. After the October Revolution, a volost revolutionary committee was elected in Nikolaevka. Nikolaevka partisans who died during the civil War are buried in a mass grave in Raihorodok. In 1931 a farm was established in Nikolaevka. By 1932 the farm had 30 cows, 150 sheep, and 30 pigs. Two collective farms were organized in the village. The top of the farm was united into the Chubar collective farm, and the lower streets of the village were united into the 15th Party Congress collective farm.

From October 1941 to June 1942 the front ran along the Donets River. On the night of September 2, 1943, all residents were evacuated along the roads in the direction of the Dnieper River. The Germans used this to cover their retreat, as a German convoy of horses and vehicles was moving alongside the civilians. Almost the entire village was burned by the Germans during their retreat. Of the 940 houses in Nikolaevka, only 72 remained. On September 12, 1943, the Workers' and Peasants' Red Army liberated the village of Varvarovka in the Kramatorsk Raion, where residents of Nikolaevka were located.

After the war, part of the collective farm lands was allocated for the construction of the Slavyansk Thermal Power Plant. Construction workers arrived here in late 1951. On September 26, 1954, the first unit of the power plant, with a capacity of 100 MW, began operation. By decision of the Central Committee of the CPSU and the Council of Ministers of the Soviet Union, construction of the main unit, the first in Europe, with a capacity of 800 MW, began in late 1963. Some time later, construction of another unit of the same capacity began. It was commissioned in 1969.

Mykolaivka received city status in 2003, and since 2016 has been the center of the community of the same name.

=== Russia-Ukraine War ===
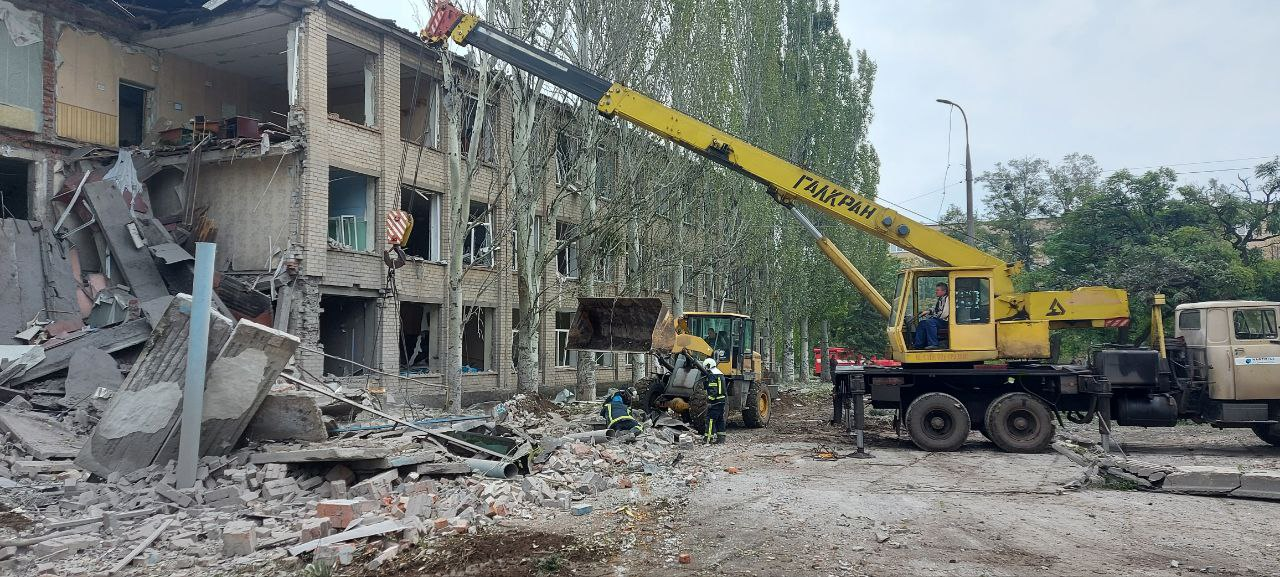
School in Mykolaivka after Russian shelling on September 28, 2022

On July 4, 2014, Ukrainian forces secured the city from pro-Russian separatists. The hospital began renovations in 2015, having been damaged in the fighting, with pro-Russian militants positioned around the building and on its roof. In 2016, the Verkhovna Rada appropriated the status of the city of district significance, withdrew it from the composition of the Sloviansk municipality and included it in the Sloviansk Raion.

On September 28, 2022, the city was shelled by Russia. One person is known to be killed.

== Social sphere ==
=== Education ===
- Nikolaevskaya Comprehensive School No. 1 (11 Muzykalnaya St.)
- Nikolaevskaya Comprehensive School No. 2 (11 50-letiya Slavyanskoy TES St.)
- Nikolaevskaya Comprehensive School No. 3 (8 Mira St.)
- Nikolaevskaya Auxiliary Boarding School for Orphans (11–15 Sinetskogo St.)
- Energetik Sports and Recreation Complex (24 50-letiya Slavyanskoy TES St.)

=== Healthcare ===
- Slavyansk Central District Hospital (13 Mira St.), which includes surgical, therapeutic, and infectious disease departments, as well as an outpatient clinic.
- Primary Health Care Center (13 Mira St.), which includes 10 outpatient clinics and 24 feldsher-midwife stations in the Slavyansk District.
- Ambulance Station (9 Kyiv Lane)

== Demographics ==
Year	Number of inhabitants
1864	1989
1885	1466
1897	1719
1903	1800
1915	3659
1959	7014
1970	15309
1979	16613
1987	16700
1989	16189
1992	16400
1994	17000
1998	16400
2002	16620
2003	16447
2004	16408
2005	16285
2006	16201
2007	16203
2008	16149
2009	16050
2010	15920
2011	15847
2012	15780
2013	15684
2014	15559
2015	15391
2016	15245
2017	15109
2018	14917
2019	14724
2020	14564
2024	4612
