= Perspektyva Stock Exchange =

Ukrainian stock exchange

Perspektiva Stock Exchange (Stock Exchange "Perspektiva" PJSC) is a Ukrainian stock exchange, which has Ukrainian beneficiaries (1), domestically developed software (2), and the active use of electronic documents management (ED) and digital signature (DS), developed in full accordance with requirements of the Ukrainian law.

These are the most important distinctions in comparison with two other high-tech Stock Exchanges, which operates on the Ukrainian stock market (PFTS and Ukrainian Exchange). They use the software of their parent company Moscow Exchange, which belongs to state institutions of the Russian Federation (including the Central Bank of Russia).

== 2017 year results ==
2017, the sixth year in a row, Perspektiva Stock Exchange ranked the first among Ukrainian Stock Exchanges in terms of trading volume. The results of 2017 shows that the share of Perspektiva SE was 62% of total trading volume of securities, leaving far behind the competitors PFTS and Ukrainian Exchange, controlled by Russian residents.

Trading volume of all kinds of securities on Perspektiva SE in 2017 totalled ₴127 billion.
