= Amstor =

Commercial property management company in Ukraine

Amstor Retail Group
- Company type: Public
- Industry: Development
- Founder: Volodymyr Vahorovskyi (Володимир Вагоровський)
- Headquarters: Ukraine
- Products: Commercial property, hypermarket, supermarket
- Website: www.amstor.com

Amstor Retail Team is a company which manages commercial properties in central and eastern Ukraine.

== History ==
Amstor was started by Ukrainian businessman Volodymyr Vahorovskyi. The first store opened in Donetsk on 28 August 2003. By 2008, 19 more Amstor stores had opened in eastern Ukraine. There were also 22 shopping centers under construction.

In 2009, about ₴280 million (around US$30 million) was spent on the company's growth.

On 20 December 2012, Amstor opened stores in Kyiv. On 25 October 2013, the first Amstor store opened in Dnipro. By 2014, the company had eight supermarkets in Donetsk, Makiivka, Sviatohirsk, and Yasynuvata. The 2014 War in Donbas stopped further growth. A fight between the main shareholder, Smart-Holding, and Volodymyr Vahorovskyi started in December 2014. In 2015, Smart-Holding gave over ₴150 million to keep 20 stores running in Ukraine.

In July 2015, Smart-Holding and Fozzy Group agreed to work together to fix Amstor. Some Amstor stores now help small and medium-sized businesses.

On 27 June 2022, an Amstor shopping mall in Kremenchuk was hit by a Russian missile.

== Corporate conflict ==
=== Background ===
During the 2008 financial crisis, Amstor was closed due to insolvency. Business partners Shifrin and Vahorovskyi offered Vadym Novynskyi 70% of Amstor's stock in exchange for working capital and restructuring the company's excessive credit portfolio. Novynskyi's company Smart-Holding provided a $3 million stabilization loan. In return, they each retained 15% of the company's stock. In 2009–2011, Novynskyi gave about $30.5 million to Amstor, and Smart-Holding concluded suretyship agreements to $50 million under the company's loans with the banks. In 2012, Amstor's first supermarket in Kyiv was opened. Later, two more Amstors were opened there.

=== Conflict ===
In March 2014, Volodymyr Vahorovskyi, without the consent of Smart-Holding, founded Amstor Trade LLC. The name of the new company was almost identical to that founded with Smart-Holding's half a year prior. The only difference was the absence of a hyphen in the name. To fill up the capital of Amstor Trade, Vahorovskyi made several fiscal transactions. One of them, for instance, was the purchase of 'worthless' securities for ₴15 million from Lancelot by Amstor Trade House, funnelling the money to Amstor Trade LLC as a loan.

Later on, the Vahorovskyis brothers acted to make a deal to sell the trademarks to the companies that were controlled by them. The equipment of Amstor supermarkets was 'sold' and 're-registered' to these companies. Similar schemes were used when withdrawing vehicles and special machinery that belonged to the retail chain. In November 2014, Smart-Holding noticed photos of receipts from Amstor outlets located in the Anti-Terrorist Operation Zone, from which the "Amstor Trade House" name disappeared, and the VAT equaled 0%. Smart-Holding did not give its consent though.

It was revealed that money from Amstor's accounts was transferred to some fake companies. From the publication of receipts in social media from the supermarkets in December 2014, Volodymyr Vahorovskyi was discovered to have used the money to buy an apartment in Hrushevsky Street in Kyiv, an expensive car, etc. The proceeds from these 18 outlets were not debited and were appropriated by the ex-managers.

=== Aftermath ===
Smart-Holding removed the Vahorovskyis from the management and assigned new managers to all the branches of the Amstor chain. Armed people acting under the command of the Vahorovskyis blocked access to the stores. All that led to the suspension in the supermarkets' operations—neither representatives of Smart-Holding nor the employees were allowed in. The representatives of Smart-Holding received access to the stores only on 9 January 2015. In 10 days, servers were removed, labour books of employees disappeared, and the IT infrastructure of Amstor, contacts of suppliers, and accounting papers were destroyed.

Amstor LLC was declared bankrupt by the decision of the Commercial Court of Dnipropetrovsk Oblast on 23 July 2019. In December 2020, Madera Development, whose beneficiary is Ihor Mazepa, acquired several shopping centers, land, and commercial equipment from Amstor at an auction in the Prozorro system.

== Outlets in the ATO zone ==
Eighteen stores of the Amstor Retail Group are situated in the ATO zone. These stores were initially operated under the supervision of Vahorovskyi, who had negotiated with the leaders of the temporarily occupied territory of Donetsk. Subsequently, Vahorovskyi lost control of the Amstor stores in the territory of the Donetsk People’s Republic due to actions by local militants.
