= Seleznivka =

Seleznivka (Ukrainian: Селезнівка) may refer to the following places in Ukraine:

- Seleznivka, Donetsk Oblast
- Seleznivka, Luhansk Oblast
