= Sloviansk Thermal Power Plant =

Power plant in Donetsk Oblast, Ukraine

Slovianska thermal power plant
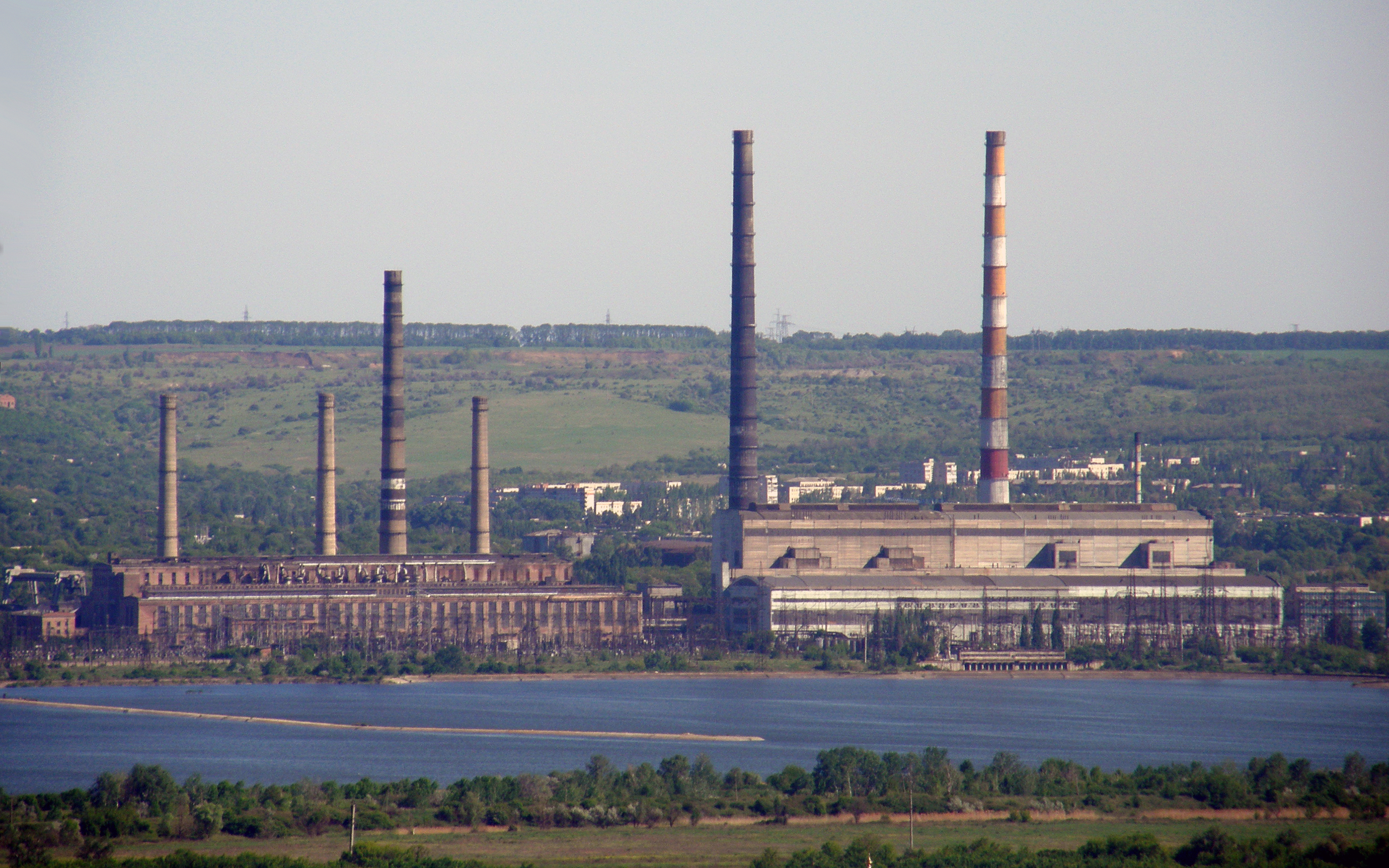
- Country: Ukraine
- Location: Donbas Region
- Coordinates: 48°52′19″N 37°45′53″E
- Owner: Donbasenergo

Power generation
- Nameplate capacity: 830 MW

External links
- Website: de.com.ua/structure-units
- Commons: Related media on Commons

Sloviansk Thermal Power Plant (Ukrainian: Слов'янська ТЕС, Russian: Славянская ТЭС) is a thermal power plant in Mykolaivka, near the city of Sloviansk, in northern Donetsk Oblast of Ukraine.

== Construction ==
The construction of the plant began in March 1951, and by September 1954 the first turbine went into service, with a power of 100 MW. In June 1957, the first phase of construction was completed, with five turbines, each with a power of 100 MW.

The second phase of construction commenced in 1964. In November 1967 and December 1971, the first and second units respectively went into service, each with a power of 800 MW.

March 30, 1970, at the Plant named after At the XXII Congress of the CPSU in Leningrad, a K-800-240-2 type turbine with a capacity of 800 MW (the most powerful single-shaft steam turbine in Europe at the time) manufactured for the Sloviansk GRES was tested, which was introduced on December 30, 1971, into operation. The turbine steam was supplied by a TPP-200-1 double-shell boiler with a steam production of 2650 t/h.

After introducing power unit #7 into operation, the power plant's capacity was raised to 2100 MW.

All stages of the power plant were designed to operate on AS, Asho, TR, TK, AKO coal, with the possibility of using seasonal surpluses of natural gas if necessary.

In the 1980s, the 800 MW power unit No. 7 was converted to co-firing coal and fuel oil.

Until 1993, the name of the plant used to be Sloviansk central district plant of the 50th anniversary of the glorious socialist October Revolution (Russian: Славянская ГРЭС им. 50-летия Великой Октябрьской социалистической революции).

In August 2013, the reconstruction of the sixth unit began. There were plans to split the unit into two, each with a power of 330 MW. The building where units are located have since been disassembled.

On July 28, 2003, the TPP was included in the list of particularly important objects of the electric power industry of Ukraine.

After relabeling, the capacity of the units was 2 × 80 MW and 1 × 720 MW. Unit No. 6 with a capacity of 800 MW was decommissioned in 1993, and decommissioned in 2003, its boiler part was dismantled in 2013–2014.

=== Installation ===
The plant has three units, each with a power of 80, 90, and 720 MW respectively.

The plant has seven chimneys in total: three with a height of 120m, two with a height of 250m, one with a height of 100m, and one with a height of 180m.

The Sloviansk Thermal Power Plant is the main employer of the city of Mykolaivka, where the plant is located.

== Russo-Ukrainian War ==
During the war in Donbas, shelling struck the plant on July 3, 2014, destroying the transformer of the seventh unit. It was subsequently replaced by the fifth unit from the Vuhlehirska Power Station, where it remained inactive for a few months.

By October 2014, Donbasenergo announced that the plant will be returning into service after repairs for wartime damages.

In April 2022, even amid the Russo-Ukrainian War reaching the periphery of the plant, it was reported that the power plant continued to be operational.

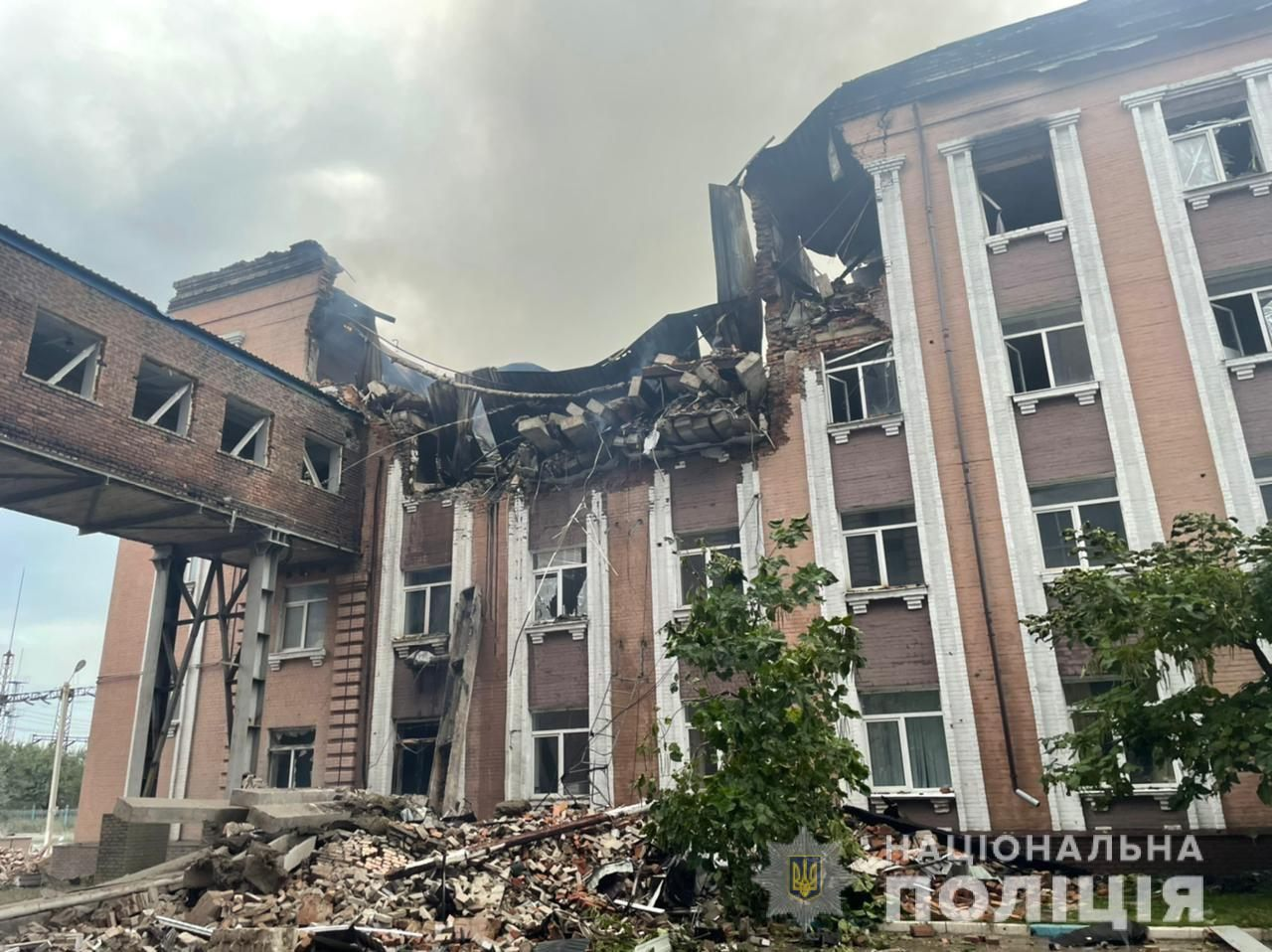
The building of the power plant after Russian missile strikes, September 17, 2022

However, with the Russian victory at Lyman by the end of May, the plant reached within only 5 miles of the frontline, making operation incredibly difficult from constant artillery fire. As a result, Donbasenergo decided to end operations at the plant to protect the lives of the workers.

On September 17, Russian missiles struck a building at the power plant, causing a fire at the scene, which was quickly contained.

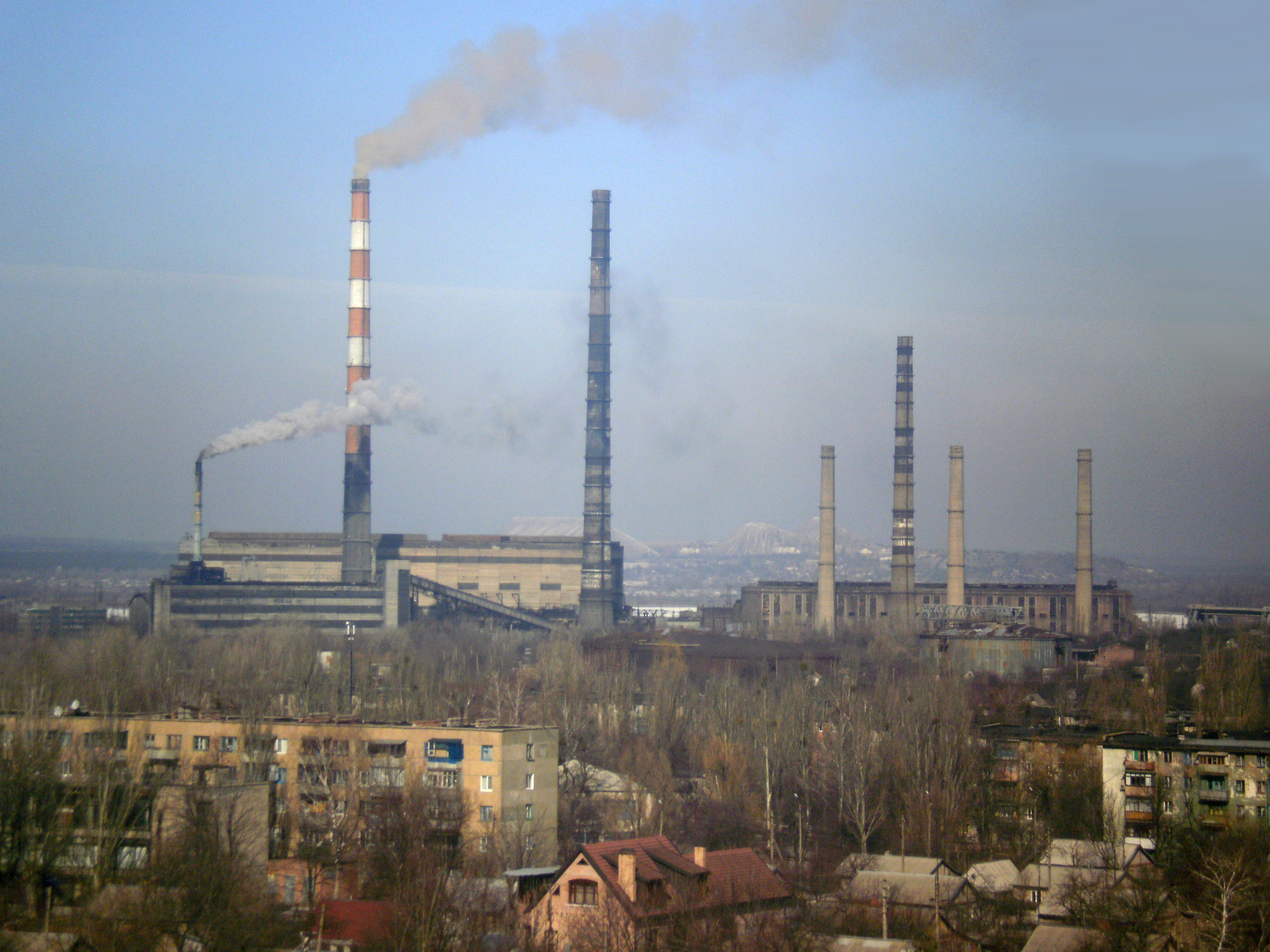
View of the thermal plant in the city of Mykolaivka, 2010

On May 5, 2024, the plant was reportedly damaged by shelling.
