= UUE =

UUE may refer to:

- Uuencode, a form of binary-to-text encoding, and its file extension ".uue"
- Ununennium, symbol Uue for '119', a theoretical chemical element
- Ukrainian Universal Exchange, a Ukrainian commodity exchange
- Union of Education and Training (Gewerkschaft Unterricht und Erziehung), a former trade union in East Germany
