= Karpivka, Mykolaivka urban hromada, Kramatorsk Raion, Donetsk Oblast =

Village in Donetsk Oblast, Ukraine

Karpivka Карпівка
- Village
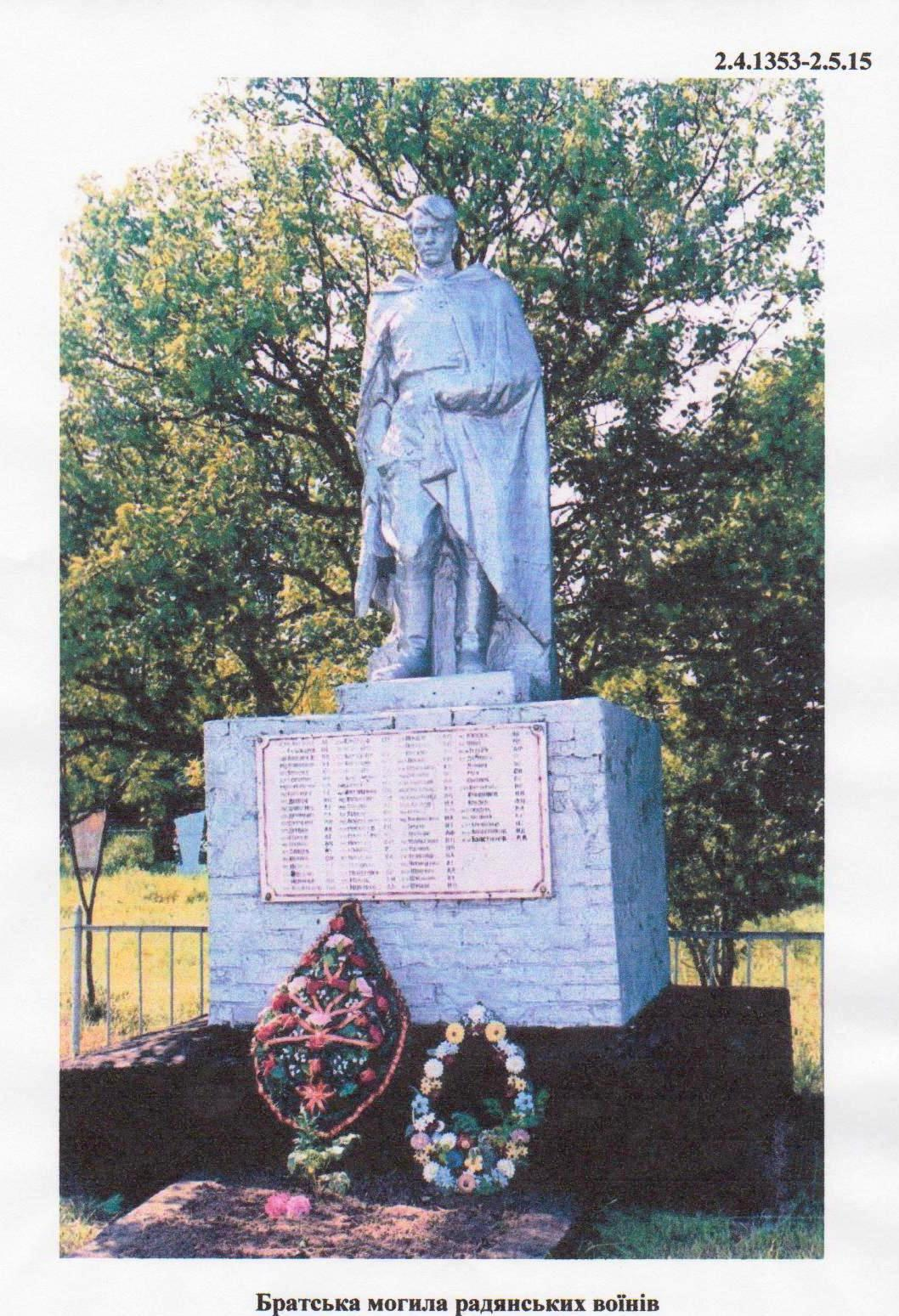
- Interactive map of Karpivka
- Karpivka in Donetsk Oblast Karpivka (Ukraine)
- Coordinates: 48°53′49″N 37°38′51″E
- Country: Ukraine
- Oblast: Donetsk Oblast
- Raion: Kramatorsk Raion
- Hromada: Mykolaivka urban hromada
- Elevation: 97 m (318 ft)

Population (2001 census)
  - Total: 368
- Time zone: UTC+2 (EET)
  - Summer (DST): UTC+3 (EEST)
- Postal code: 84110
- Area code: +380 626

Karpivka (Ukrainian: Карпівка; Russian: Карповка) is a village in Kramatorsk Raion (district) in Donetsk Oblast of eastern Ukraine. It belongs to Mykolaivka urban hromada, one of the hromadas of Ukraine.

Until 18 July 2020, Karpivka belonged to Sloviansk Raion. The raion was abolished in July 2020 as part of the administrative reform of Ukraine, which reduced the number of raions of Donetsk Oblast to eight, of which only five were controlled by the government. The area of Sloviansk Raion was merged into Kramatorsk Raion.
