= Retroville =

Retroville may refer to:

- Retroville, a fictional city and setting of The Adventures of Jimmy Neutron, Boy Genius
- Retroville, the shopping mall destroyed in the Kyiv shopping centre bombing
- Retroville, a song on Pi’erre Bourne’s 2021 album The Life of Pi’erre 5
