= Khmelnytskyi Nuclear Power Plant =

Nuclear power plant in Ukraine

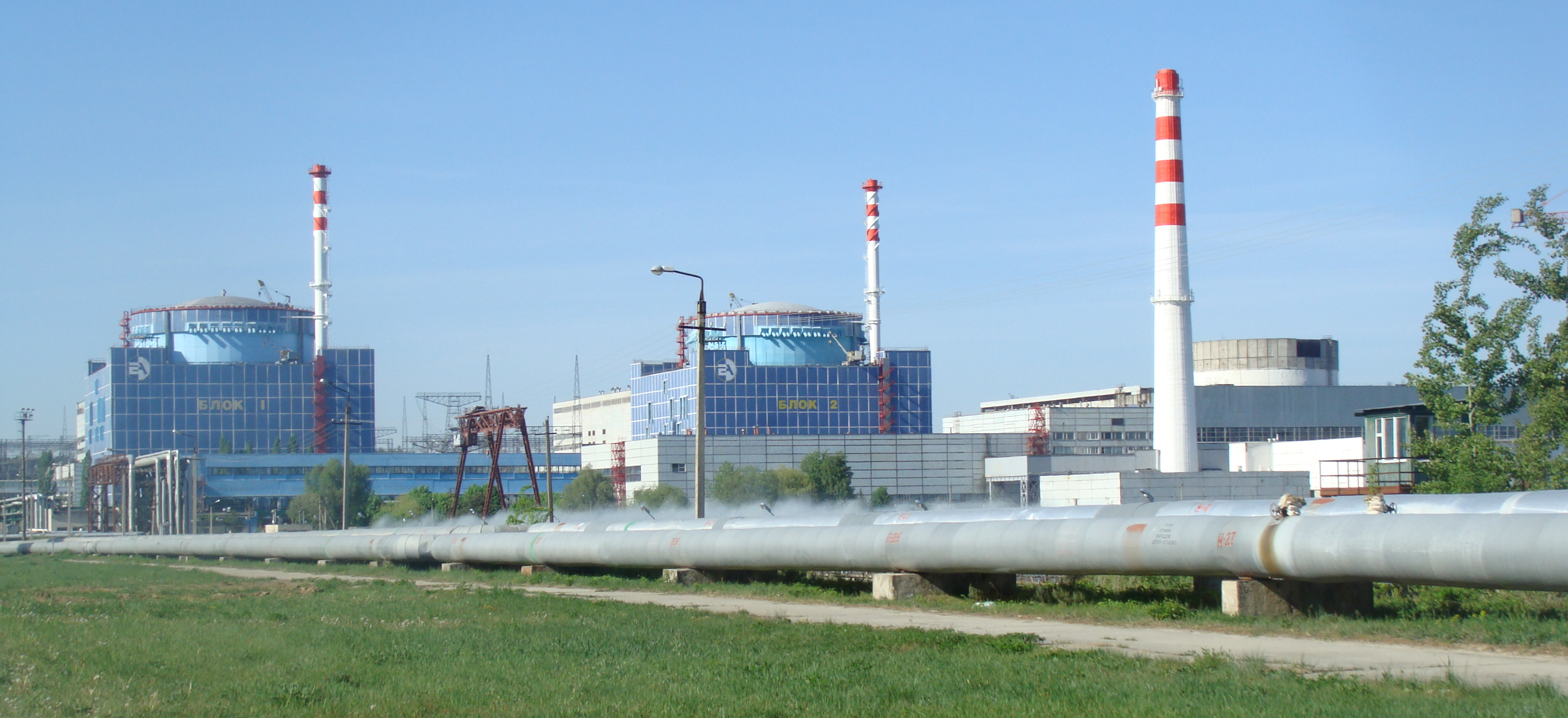
- Khmelnytskyi Nuclear Power Plant
- Country: Ukraine
- Location: Netishyn
- Coordinates: 50°18′5.06″N 26°38′59.10″E
- Status: Operational
- Construction began: 1981
- Commission date: 1987
- Owner: Energoatom
- Operator: Energoatom

Nuclear power station
- Reactor type: VVER
- Reactor supplier: Atomstroyexport

Power generation
- Units operational: 2 x 1,000 MW
- Make and model: Turbines and generators: LMZ; Electrosila
- Units under const.: 2 x 1,000 MW
- Nameplate capacity: 2,000 MW

External links
- Website: www.xaec.org.ua
- Commons: Related media on Commons

The Khmelnytskyi Nuclear Power Plant generates nuclear power in Ukraine. The plant is operated by Energoatom. Two VVER-1000 reactors are operational, each generating 1000 MW (net) of electricity, with two AP1000 reactors under construction.

Khmelnytskyi Nuclear Power Plant is connected to the Rzeszów–Khmelnytskyi powerline, one of three 750 kV lines running between Ukraine and the European Union.

On two occasions in November 2023, explosions were heard near the Khmelnitsky Nuclear Power Plant and its two Soviet-era reactors, which was assumed to be the result of near-misses by Russian missile attacks on or near the facility.

== History ==
Construction of the first reactor started under the Soviet Union in 1981 and the first unit was put in operation in late 1987. Construction of the second reactor started in 1983 with plans to finish it in 1991. In 1990, however, construction was stopped as part of a moratorium on new plant construction introduced due to public mistrust following the Chernobyl disaster. Construction was completed only in August 2004 after the moratorium was lifted.

Since 1992, it has been guarded by the 3rd NPP Protection Battalion.

Two more VVER-1000 reactors were under construction: construction of the third reactor started in September 1985 and the fourth reactor in June 1986. Construction was stopped in 1990 when they were 75% and 28% complete, respectively. An intergovernmental agreement on the resumption of construction was signed between Ukraine and Russia in June 2010. In February 2011, Energoatom and Atomstroyexport signed a contract agreement for the completion of reactors 3 and 4. They should have been commissioned in 2018 and 2020, respectively. Feasibility study of reactors 3 and 4 was conducted by Kyiv Institute Energoproekt.

Following the Russian attack on Ukraine going on since February 2014 with varying intensity the Ukrainian government of Arseniy Yatseniuk formally terminated the agreement with Russia in September 2015.

In August 2016 an agreement with Korea Hydro & Nuclear Power was made to assist with the completion of reactors 3 and 4, but little progress was made. In 2020 a Ukrainian working group assessed the safety of the old cranes on the site needed to progress construction work.

Energoatom considered disconnecting unit 2 from the Ukrainian power grid and connecting it to the Burshtyn energy island centered around the coal powered Burshtyn TES, which up to 2022 was the only part of Ukraine connected to the European power grid, to facilitate exports to Poland and Hungary. In 2019 the Ministry of Energy created a consortium, Ukraine Power Bridge Company Limited, to progress the project, but as of 2020 the project was not agreed.

In February 2025, Ukraine's Verkhovna Rada approved a plan to purchase unused VVER-1000 equipment from Bulgaria's cancelled Belene Nuclear Power Plant to complete units 3 and 4.

== AP1000 reactors ==
In late November 2021, Energoatom and Westinghouse Electric agreed on a contract to construct the first Westinghouse AP1000 reactor in Ukraine at the Khmelnytskyi plant.

In May 2022, Energoatom stated that the Russian invasion of Ukraine going on since February, and occupations of other power stations had not changed their ambitions to construct these units. They are still working with Westinghouse to construct two AP1000 reactors at the site.

Employees from the Russia-occupied Zaporizhzhia Nuclear Power Plant will be hired to operate these new reactors.

== See also ==
- Nuclear power in Ukraine
- 3rd Nuclear Power Plant Protection Battalion (Ukraine)
- Energoatom
