= Concorde Capital =

Ukrainian investment company

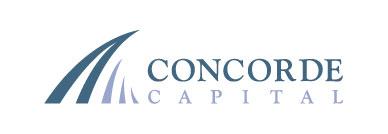
- Industry: Financial services
- Founded: 2004; 22 years ago
- Founder: Igor Mazepa
- Headquarters: Kyiv, Ukraine
- Website: concorde.ua

Concorde Capital is a Ukrainian investment company based in Kyiv, Ukraine. It offers investment banking, brokerage services, and asset management in Ukraine.

== History ==
The company was founded in 2004 by its owner and CEO, Igor Mazepa.

=== Brokerage activity ===
2005–08 – Concorde Capital ranks among the top five stock traders, according to the PFTS, and among the leaders on the Ukrainian securities market as a whole.

2009 – Concorde Capital becomes one of the leading participants on the Ukrainian Exchange, in which it’s a shareholder. Concorde Capital is recognizedas the top Ukrainian broker amongeEmerging EMEAs, based on the results of the 2009 Thomson Reuters Extel annual survey of financial markets.

2011 – Concorde Capital achieves 18th place on the UX spot market.

On June 11, 2015, on the official website of Concorde Capital, there was news that Concorde Private Equity is creating a company that will provide brokerage services on the forex market, for which Concorde Private Equity has entered into an agreement with Forex Trend Limited on preferential terms for former customers. On October 7, 2015, news appeared about the start of the work of the new broker PrivateFX.

2016 – Concorde Capital earns first place among the nominees for “Best sales/trader on the Ukrainian market” in the annual voting for the 2016 Cbonds Awards for the CIS region.

In January 2024, Concorde Capital's offices were searched after the arrest of CEO and Founder Igor Mazepa by the Ukrainian State Bureau of Investigation. Concorde Capital stated that these searches were conducted illegally and that Mazepa's criticism of Ukrainian security services were linked to his arrest. The arrest was allegedly linked to the development of Goodlife Park in Vyshhorod, Kyiv Oblast which Concorde Capital invested on, SBI later stated that he had been arrested in relation to seizing lands related to the Kyiv Hydroelectric Power Station.

In 2026, it was reported that Concorde Capital was helping Andriy Kobolyev to invest in energy storage systems, which he said was in an effort to help decarbonise the economy. Concorde's CEO had previously helped to raise money for Kobolyev's bail when he was arrested in March 2023.

=== Investment banking activity ===
The firm has attracted more than USD 5 billion using the various financial instruments for leading Ukrainian companies in the metallurgy, automobile, chemical, oil & gas, agricultural, real estate and pharmaceutical sectors.

2007–08 – Concorde Capital finishes first place by number of M&A deals in Ukraine among Ukrainian and global investment banks, and finishes first based on number of M&A deals in the financial sector among CIS countries in 2007, as determined by MergerMarket and DealWatch.

=== Research ===
2007–08 – Concorde Capital’s research department is recognized first in Ukraine, based on the annual Thomson Reuters Extel survey.

2009 – Concorde Capital ranks among the top three research teams in Ukraine.

2016 – Concorde Capital finishes first place in the Extel survey among its nominees for “Emerging EMEA: Ukraine: Country Research” as determined by a survey of employees of international hedge funds, private equity funds, and public companies.

Concorde Capital's head of research Alexander Paraschiy is frequently asked for analysis on Ukrainian government and business matters.
