= 3rd Nuclear Power Plant Protection Battalion =

3rd Nuclear Power Plant Defense Battalion
- 3-й окремий батальйон охорони ОВДО НГ (Ukrainian)
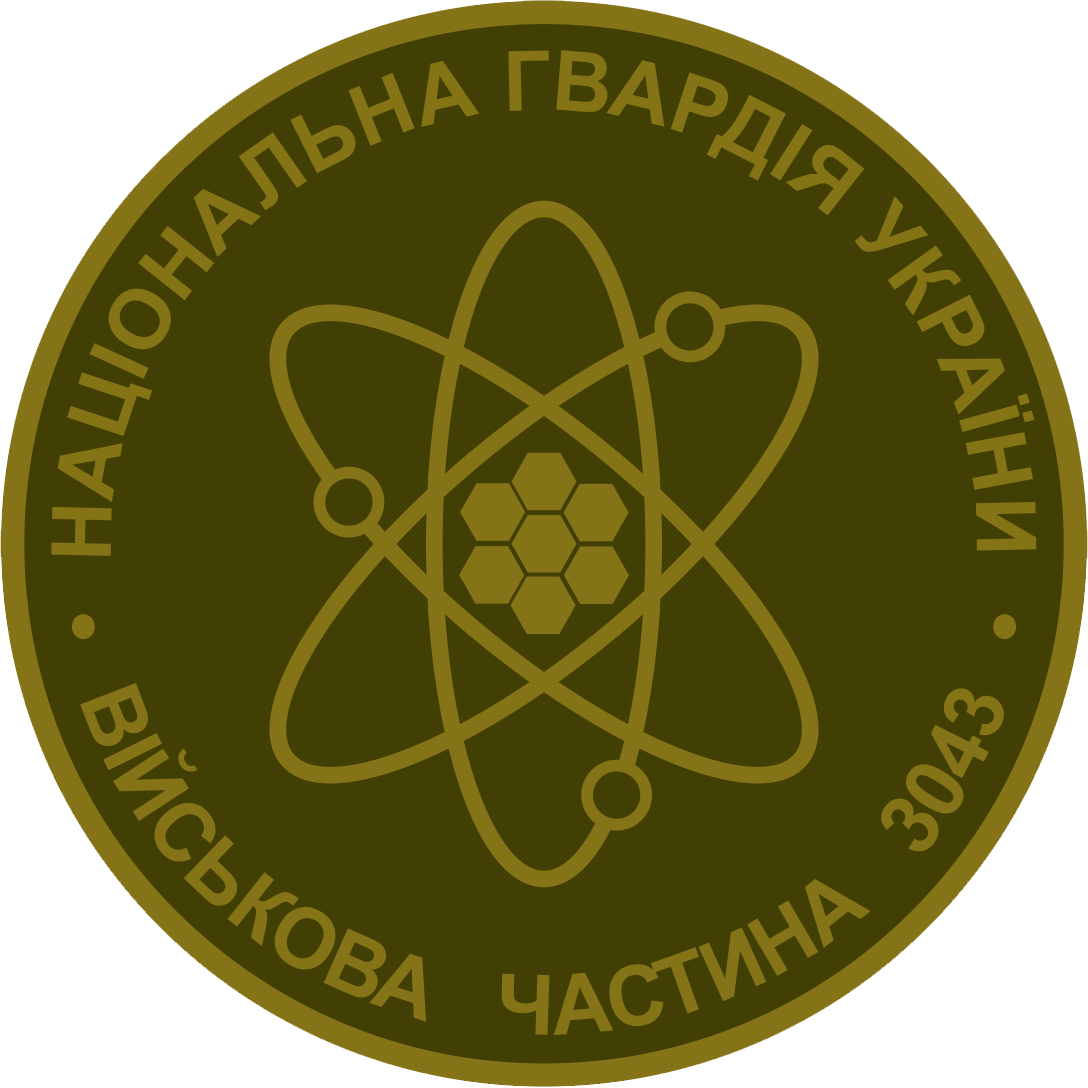
- Regimental Insignia
- Founded: 1992
- Country: Ukraine
- Allegiance: Ministry of Internal Affairs
- Branch: National Guard of Ukraine
- Type: Battalion
- Role: CBRN defense of Khmelnytskyi Nuclear Power Plant
- Part of: National Guard of Ukraine
- Garrison/HQ: Khmelnytskyi
- Engagements: Russo-Ukrainian war: War in Donbas; Russian invasion of Ukraine

Commanders
- Current commander: Colonel Kostyantyn Kabanov

The 3rd Nuclear Power Plant Defense Battalion is a battalion of the National Guard of Ukraine tasked with CBRN defense specifically of the Khmelnytskyi Nuclear Power Plant and has seen action against Russian forces during the Russian invasion of Ukraine. In its current form, it was established in 1992 and headquartered at Khmelnytskyi.

== History ==
It was established on 1 July 1992 as a part of the Internal Troops of Ukraine to protect and guard the Khmelnytskyi Nuclear Power Plant.

In 2014, it became a part of the National Guard of Ukraine and started operations during the War in Donbass with its special purpose platoon seeing heavy combat.

Following the Russian invasion of Ukraine, the Battalion saw action against Russian troops. It was reported that throughout the Russo-Ukrainian war, at least four personnel of the battalion were killed in action. On 15 November 2022, during a large scale Russian assault on Ukraine, the Khmelnytskyi Nuclear Power Plant, under the battalion's protection, lost full access to the power grid and temporarily switched to backup power from diesel generators and both reactors had to be stopped. On 10 February 2023, one of the units of the Khmelnytskyi Nuclear Power Plant stopped as result of a massive Russian attack causing instability on the nearby power grid. Khmelnytskyi Nuclear Power Plant was again attacked on 29 November 2023 with several explosions being reported near it.

== Structure ==
The structure of the battalion is as follows:

- 3rd Nuclear Power Plant Defense Battalion
  - Management and Headquarters
  - Object Commandant's Office
  - 1st Special Commandant's Office
  - 2nd Special Commandant's Office
  - Special Purpose Platoon
    - Capture Group
    - Artillery Support Group
    - Robotic Intelligence Complexes Department
  - Combat and Logistical Support Platoon
    - Cynological Group
    - Automobile Department
  - Engineering, Technical and Communications Platoon
  - Special Cargo Protection Group
  - Medical Center

== Commanders ==
- Colonel Kostyantyn Kabanov (2018-)

== Sources ==
- Військова частина 3043 міста Нетішин відзначила 30-ти річчя
- 30 10 2015 ХАЕС 30 жовтня – навчання у військовій частині 3043 Національної гвардії України
- Виповнилося 30 років військовій частині 3043 з охорони ХАЕС
- Нацгвардія купила бронежилетів на 37 мільйонів: 6 клас захисту подорожчав, 4 клас – подешевшав
