= Igor Mazepa =

Ukrainian businessman

Igor Mazepa Ігор Мазепа
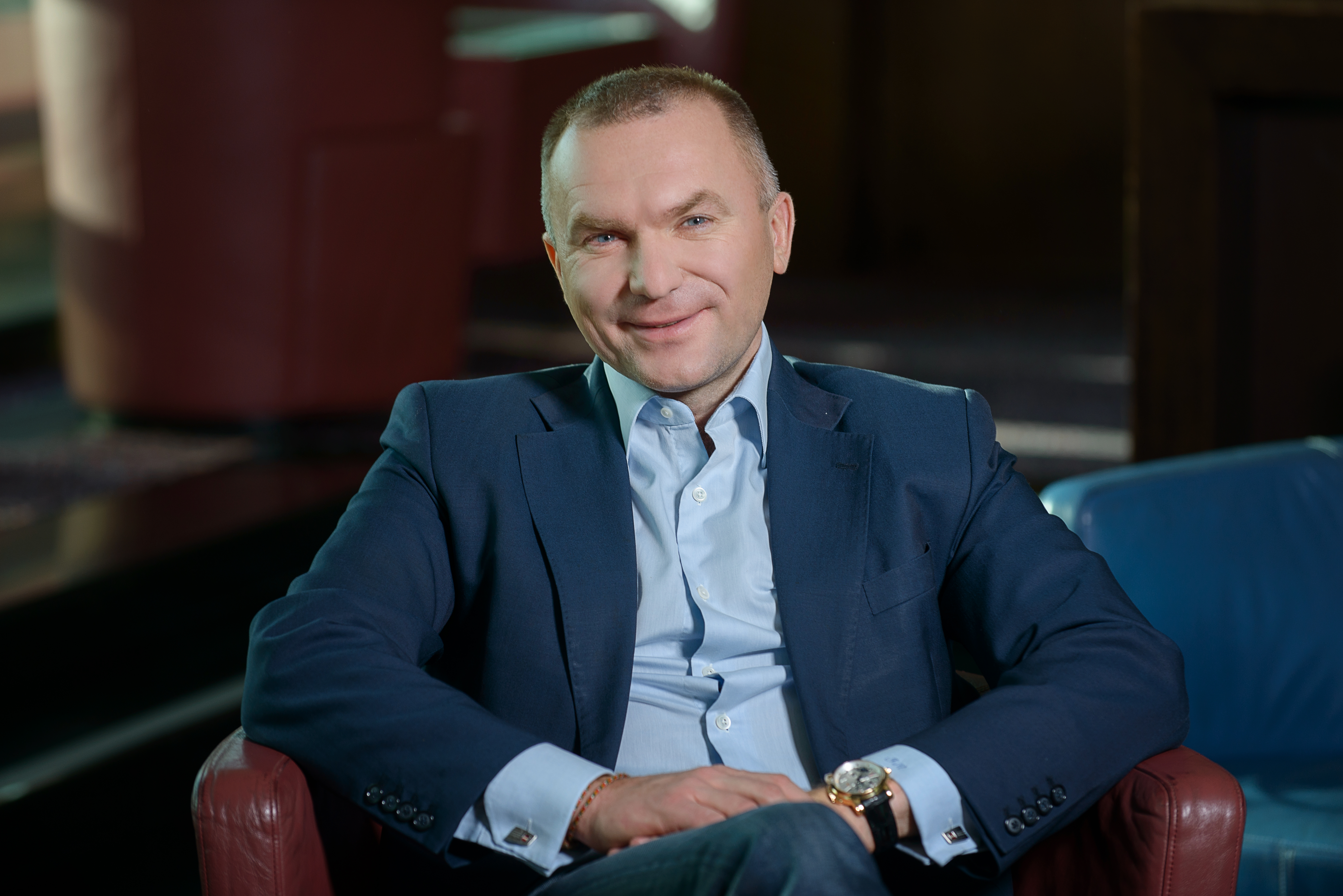

Personal details
- Occupation: Director general of Concorde Capital investment company

Igor Aleksandrovich Mazepa (Ukrainian: Мазе́па І́гор Олекса́ндрович; born 2 July 1976) is the director general of the Concorde Capital investment company in Kyiv, Ukraine.

== Biography ==
He graduated from Kyiv National Economic University having completed graduation programs in International Economics and Law.

In 1997, he started his career of investment banker in Russian – American Investment Company Prospect Investments. In 2000—2002 he worked in the position of managing director at IC Foyil Securities New Europe, and then as director of IC IFC (International Financial Corporation).

In 2004, he founded and became director general of IC Concorde Capital. Many years the company retains the position of one of three best investment banks of Ukraine (according to the largest international information agency Thomson Reuters).

In 2008, he was elected as chairman of the exchange committee of the Ukrainian Exchange, and at present he continues to act in this capacity.

In July–September 2014, he acted as a member of the Supervisory Committee of PJSC Alfa-Bank.

In 2010, he participated in the project of ICTV channel “Ukrainian Dream” as one of investors of promising business ideas of common Ukrainians.

The best manager in the exchange market of Ukraine as ranked by the publishing house “Economics”, in 2007- winner in the nomination “Personality of the exchange market of Ukraine” of the financial rating of Business magazine.

Igor Mazepa's business name was involved in numerous scandals. In 2015, Igor Mazepa's corporation Concorde Capital founded a forex broker PrivateFX, which became a technical successor of the scandalously ruined financial pyramid Forex Trend Limited developed in 2011 by the arrested financial criminal Pavel Krymov. The information about Igor Mazepa's 100% stake in the capital of the PrivateFX was publicly confirmed by CEO of PrivateFX Alexander Bykov. In April 2017, Igor Mazepa made a technical sale of PrivateFX to the unknown front company Prime Broker, without having closed the obligations to investors for almost $18 Millions.
