= Mykolaivka urban hromada =

Mykolaivka urban hromada Миколаївська міська громада
- Hromada
- Interactive map of Mykolaivka urban hromada
- Country: Ukraine
- Oblast: Donetsk
- Raion: Kramatorsk

Area
  - Total: 334.3 km^{2} (129.1 sq mi)

Population (2020)
  - Total: 20,943
  - Density: 62.65/km^{2} (162.3/sq mi)
- Settlements: 15
- Cities: 1
- Rural settlements: 2
- Villages: 12

Mykolaivka urban hromada (Ukrainian: Миколаївська міська громада) is a hromada of Ukraine, located in Kramatorsk Raion, Donetsk Oblast. Its administrative center is the city Mykolaivka.

It has an area of 334.3 square kilometres (129.1 mi^{2}) and a population of 20,943, as of 2020.

The hromada contains 15 settlements: 1 city (Mykolaivka), 2 urban-type settlements (Raihorodok and Donetske), and 12 villages:

- Karpivka
- Seleznivka
- Malynivka
- Vasyutynske
- Nikonorivka
- Orihuvatka
- Tikhonivka
- Yurkivka
- Rai-Oleksandrivka
- Piskunivka
- Starodubivka
- Pershomariivka

== See also ==
- List of hromadas of Ukraine
