= Seleznivka, Donetsk Oblast =

Village in Donetsk Oblast, Ukraine

Seleznivka Селезнівка
- Village
- Location of Seleznivka in Donetsk Oblast Seleznivka (Donetsk Oblast)
- Coordinates: 48°51′46″N 37°40′07″E
- Country: Ukraine
- Oblast: Donetsk Oblast
- Raion: Kramatorsk Raion
- Hromada: Mykolaivka urban hromada
- Elevation: 60 m (200 ft)

Population (2001)
  - Total: 219
- Time zone: UTC+2
  - Summer (DST): UTC+3
- Postal code: 84110
- Area code: +380 626

Seleznivka (Ukrainian: Селезнівка) is a village in Kramatorsk Raion of Donetsk Oblast, Ukraine. It forms part of Mykolaivka urban hromada, one of the hromadas of Ukraine.

Until 18 July 2020, Seleznivka was located in Sloviansk Raion. The raion was abolished that day as part of the administrative reform of Ukraine, the number of raions of Donetsk Oblast was reduced to eight, of which only five were controlled by the government.
