= Donetske, Donetsk Oblast =

Urban locality in Donetsk Oblast, Ukraine

Donetske Донецьке
- Rural settlement
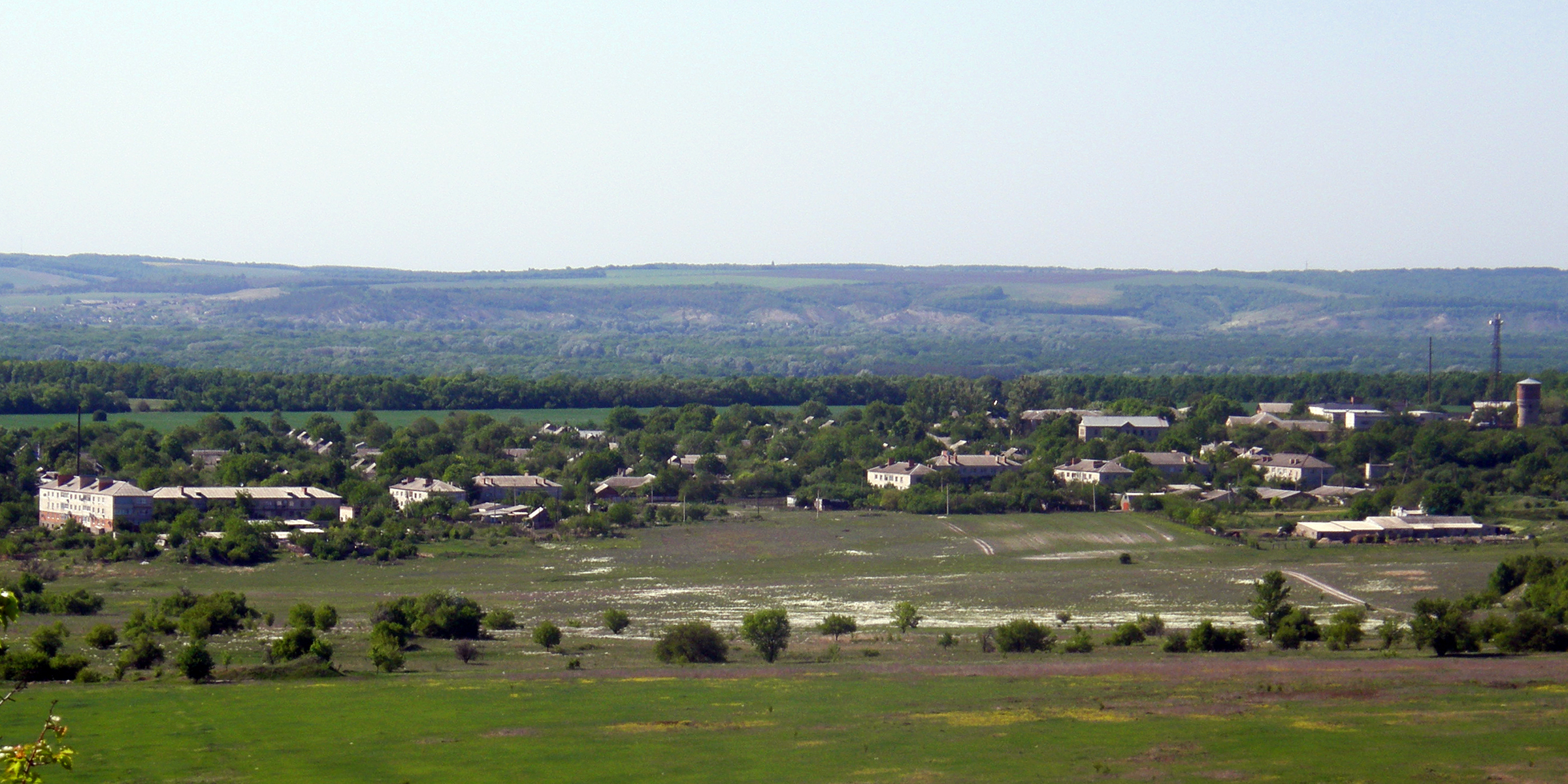
- Interactive map of Donetske
- Location within Donetsk Oblast Location within Ukraine
- Coordinates: 48°56′05″N 37°41′26″E
- Country: Ukraine
- Oblast: Donetsk Oblast
- Raion: Kramatorsk Raion
- Hromada: Mykolaivka urban hromada
- Elevation: 129 m (423 ft)

Population (2022)
  - Total: 574
- Time zone: UTC+2 (EET)
  - Summer (DST): UTC+3 (EEST)
- Postal code: 84151
- Area code: +380 6262

Donetske (Ukrainian: Донецьке) is a rural settlement in Kramatorsk Raion, Donetsk Oblast, eastern Ukraine. It belongs to Mykolaivka urban hromada, one of the hromadas of Ukraine. Population: 574 (2022 estimate).
