= Raihorodok =

Urban locality in Donetsk Oblast, Ukraine

Raihorodok Райгородок
- Rural settlement
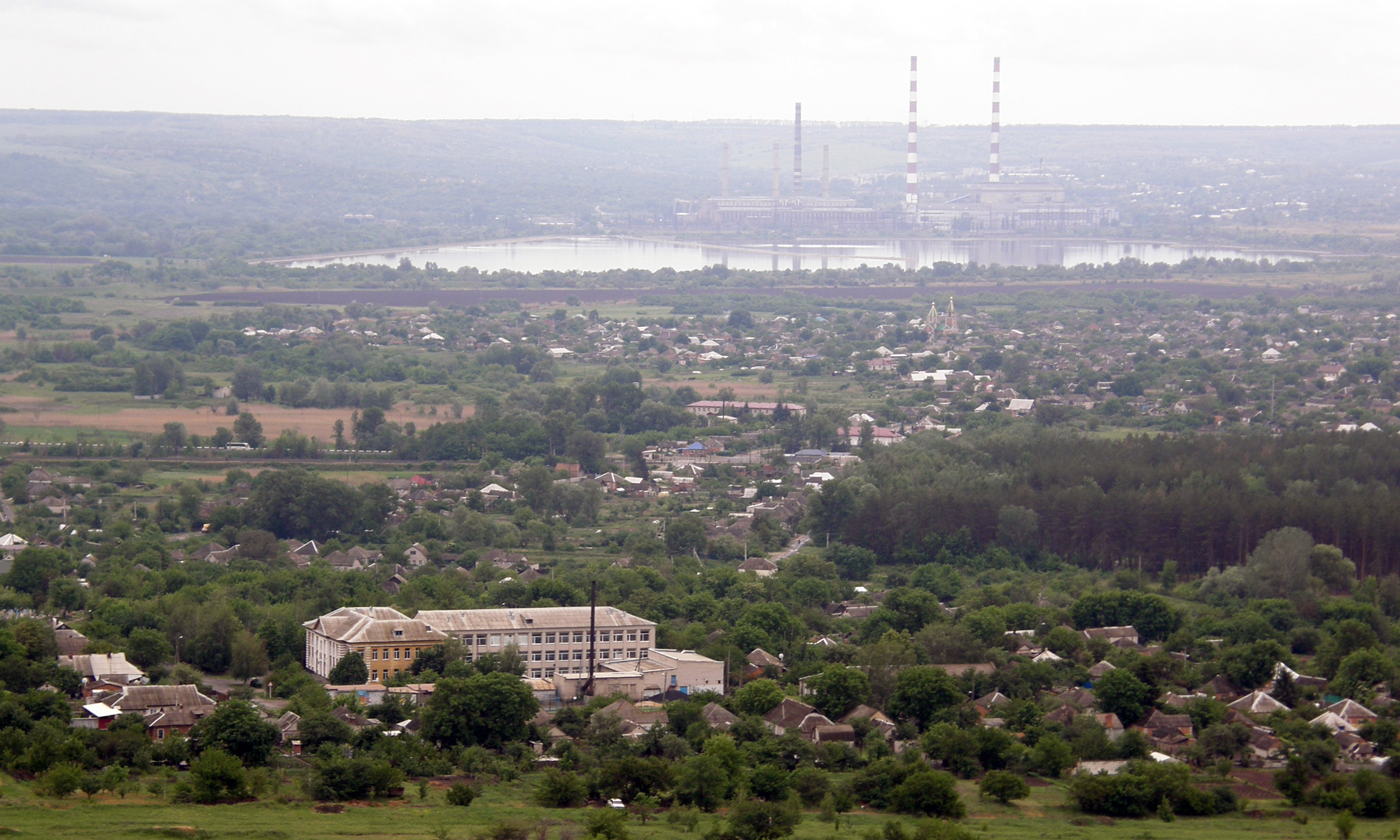

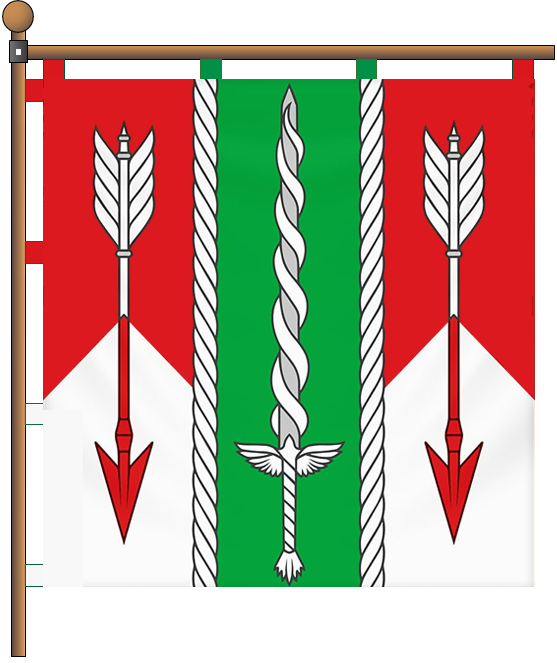
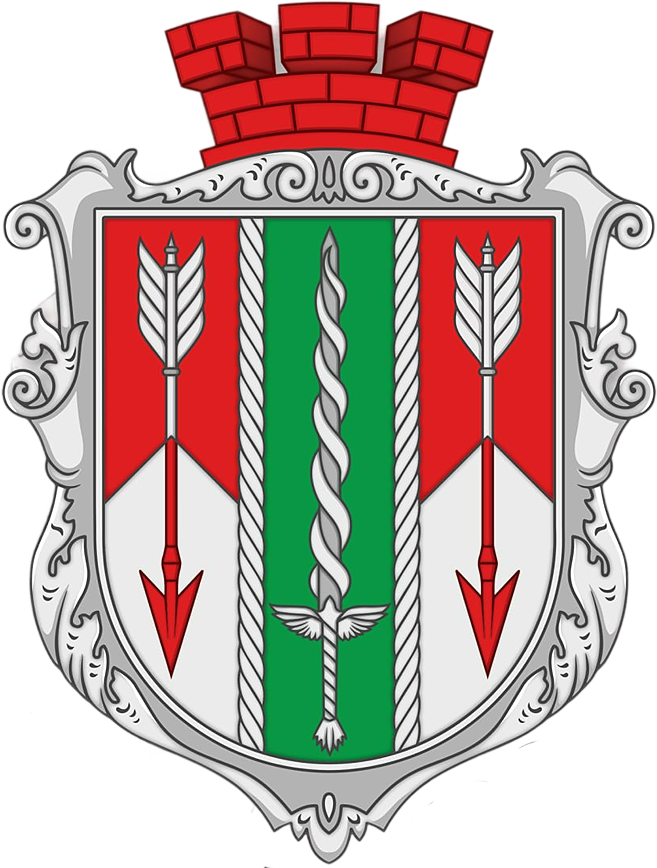
- Flag Coat of arms
- Interactive map of Raihorodok
- Location of Raihorodok within Donetsk Oblast#Location of Raihorodok within Ukraine Raihorodok (Ukraine)
- Coordinates: 48°54′01″N 37°43′26″E
- Country: Ukraine
- Oblast: Donetsk Oblast
- Raion: Kramatorsk Raion
- Hromada: Mykolaivka urban hromada
- Founded: 1685
- Elevation: 62 m (203 ft)

Population (2022)
  - Total: 3,166
- Time zone: UTC+2 (EET)
  - Summer (DST): UTC+3 (EEST)
- Postal code: 84150
- Area code: +380 6262

Raihorodok (Ukrainian: Райгородок, romanized: Raihorodok, lit. 'Heavenly town') is a rural settlement in Kramatorsk Raion, Donetsk Oblast, eastern Ukraine. It is located near the Kazennyi Torets and Donets Rivers. Population: 3,166 (2022 estimate).

== History ==
The town was founded in 1708. After the events associated with K. Bulavin, the town was destroyed, and the lands were taken from the Cossacks and transferred to the control of the Sloboda Ukraine. In 1736, it was moved to a new location due to the flooding of the Donets River.

At the beginning of the 20th century, V.F. Spesivtsev discovered a Golden Horde settlement here. Information about this research mentions the remains of a mosque and brick buildings. Golden Horde coins from 1356 to 1384 were found at the site. Nomadic burials were also studied in the area of the settlement.

In 1899, Raygorodok was a settlement of theIzyumsky District, Kharkiv Province, Russian Empire, with a population of 2,200. From September 1 (O.S.) to October 25 (O.S.), 1917, it was part of the Russian Republic. During the Civil War, the village was in the combat zone, and power changed hands several times. From April 29 to December 14, 1918, it was part of the Ukrainian State.

From December 1922, it was part of the Ukrainian SSR. From October 27, 1938, it was an urban-type settlement. During the Great Patriotic War in 1941, the village of was occupied by advancing German troops, but by the end of January 21, 1942, it was liberated by troops of the 57th Army (Lieutenant General Dmitry Ryabyshev) of the Southern Front (commander Lieutenant General Rodion Malinovsky) during the Barvenkovo-Lozovskaya offensive operation.

In January 1989, the population was 4,227 people with 1,929 men and 2,298 women. As of January 1, 2013, the population was 3,582 people.

On April 19, 2014, near the village, two bodies were found with traces of murder: Gorlovka deputy Vladimir Rybak (Batkivshchyna) and Kyiv student of the Communist Party of Ukraine Yuriy Popravko. Since both were Euromaidan activists, suspicion fell on their political opponents. If the deputy was kidnapped in Gorlovka on April 17, then the student was last seen on April 16 in Kharkiv, where he went to visit his girlfriend.

Until 18 July 2020, Raihorodok was located in Sloviansk Raion. The raion was abolished on that day as part of the administrative reform of Ukraine, which reduced the number of raions of Donetsk Oblast to eight, of which only five were controlled by the government. The area of Sloviansk Raion was merged into Kramatorsk Raion.

During the 2022 Russian invasion of Ukraine, Russian occupiers blew up a nearby dam, causing flooding in Raihorodok before the settlement was liberated by the Ukrainian army.
