= Kremenchuk shopping mall attack =

2022 missile attack in Ukraine

- Part of the Russian invasion of Ukraine
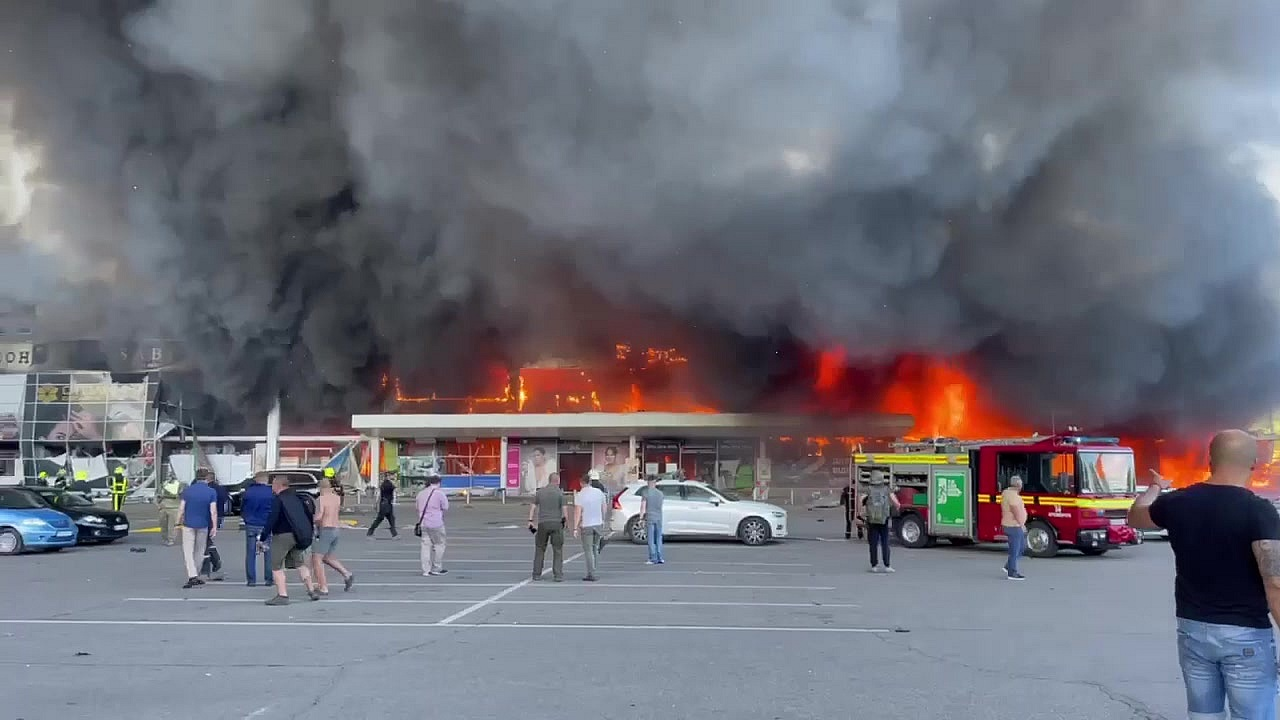
- Amstor mall in Kremenchuk after Russian shelling
- Location: 49°4′12″N 33°25′30″E, 49°4′27.7″N 33°25′40.6″E; Kremenchuk, Ukraine
- Date: 27 June 2022 (UTC+3)
- Target: Kredmash plant and Amstor shopping mall in Kremenchuk
- Attack type: Missile strike
- Weapon: Kh-22 Air-to-surface missile
- Deaths: 21
- Injuries: 59
- Perpetrator: Russian Air Force: 22nd Guards Heavy Bomber Aviation Division

Video of the strike

Fire after the strike

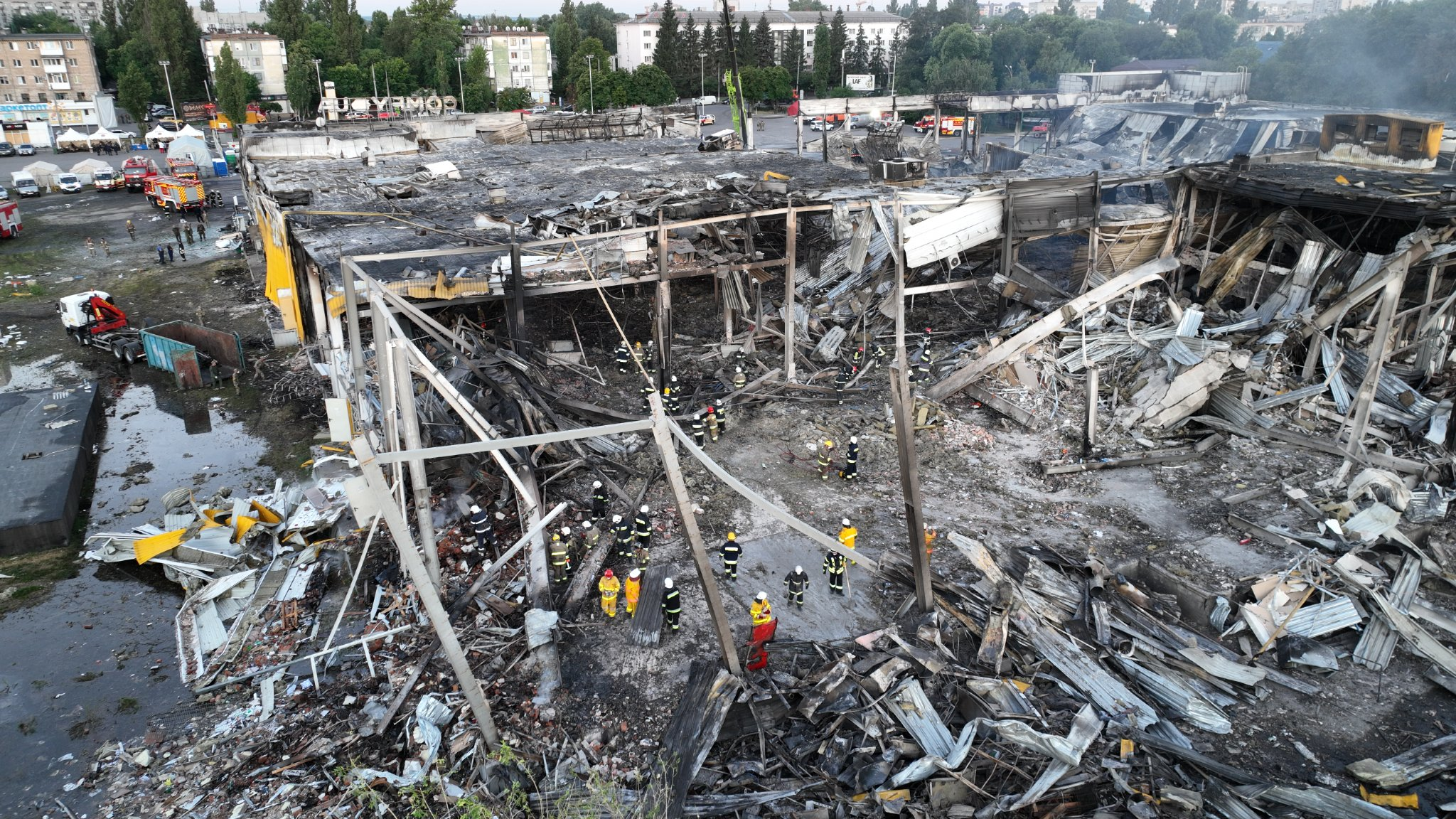
Ruins of the building

On 27 June 2022, the Russian Armed Forces fired two Kh-22 cruise missiles into central Kremenchuk, Poltava Oblast, hitting the Kredmash road machinery plant and the immediately adjacent Amstor shopping mall. A fire broke out and the attack killed at least 20 people and injured at least 59. Russian media and officials carried conflicting stories about the attack.

== Background ==
The explosion at the Amstor shopping center was the fifth attack on Kremenchuk since the beginning of the full-scale Russian invasion in February 2022. The attack on 27 June caused the largest number of casualties. The previous attacks had taken place on 2 and 24 April, 12 May and 18 June.

Prior to the Russian invasion of Ukraine, Kremenchuk was an industrial city of about 217,000 inhabitants and the location of the country's largest oil refinery, located some 10 kilometres (6.2 mi; 5.4 nmi) from the mall. The shopping mall that was struck, located in the city center, covered an area of about 1 hectare (10,000 m^{2}).

== Attack ==
According to the Armed Forces of Ukraine, the attack was carried out by Kh-22 anti-ship missiles launched from Russian Tu-22M3 strategic bombers that took off from the Shaykovka air base in the Kaluga region. The missiles were launched over the territory of the Kursk region. According to Ukrainian media, they belong to the 52nd Heavy Bomber Aviation Regiment, of the 22nd Guards Heavy Bomber Aviation Division, commanded by Colonel Oleg Timoshin. Ukrainian Interior Minister Denys Monastyrsky said that the missile hit the far end of the shopping mall. The area of the resulting fire was more than 10,000 square metres (110,000 sq ft) and up to 115 firefighters and 20 fire-fighting appliances were involved in extinguishing it.

A second missile struck the Kredmash road machinery plant, located about 300 metres (980 ft) north of the mall. The Kredmash plant had been involved in the repair of three armoured personnel carriers (BTR-70s) eight years earlier. Both missiles fell about 450 metres (1,480 ft) apart and may have been aimed at the same target, since such distance is within the known limited accuracy of Kh-22 missiles (according to the international security expert Sebastien Roblin, "only half of the shots land within 600 meters of the aiming point").

An employee in the mall told reporters that many felt they were safe at the mall as they were not a place of danger for the Russians and away from front lines. Similar comments were echoed by a shopper who expressed shock that the mall was hit, calling it a safe place with women and children. According to the survivors, an air raid alert sounded several minutes before the strike.

Russia's defence ministry later officially admitted responsibility for the attack, saying that it hit a weapons depot in a nearby factory and that the detonation of munitions caused the fire to spread to the "non-functioning" shopping centre. Those claims were found to be false by multiple organizations.

On 29 June, the UK Ministry of Defence said, "There is a realistic possibility the missile strike on the Kremenchuk shopping centre on 27 June 2022 was intended to hit a nearby infrastructure target." It added, "Russian planners highly likely remain willing to accept a high level of collateral damage when they perceive military necessity in striking a target." A possibility is that, as anti-ship missiles have a different terminal guidance design to land-attack missiles, the missile locked on to the large radar return of the shopping centre's flat metal walls instead of the intended target. That a weapon poorly optimised for the mission was used may be due to Russia depleting its stockpile of more suitable munitions.

== Casualties ==
Dmytro Lunin, Governor of Poltava Oblast, said 20 people were dead, and 59 people were injured. 36 people were reported missing. According to Ukrainian President Volodymyr Zelenskyy, there were more than 1,000 people inside the mall when the strike occurred.

== Investigation ==
Per reports from independent military experts and researchers with Molfar, a global open sourced intelligence community, the factory and mall were too far apart from one another to cause any fires or explosions. Additional phone messages, which were reportedly from local management of the shopping mall, were found by investigators, which told employees to stay working through air raid alarms. The non-profit online journalism collective Bellingcat used receipts from recent purchases at the mall to prove that the mall had been open prior to the attack.

== Reactions ==
The leaders of the G7 nations described the missile strike as an "abominable attack". "We stand united with Ukraine in mourning the innocent victims", they said in a joint statement. "Indiscriminate attacks on innocent civilians constitute a war crime. Russian President Putin and those responsible will be held to account."

US Secretary of State Antony Blinken called the attack an "atrocity" and said, "The world is horrified by Russia's missile strike today, which hit a crowded Ukrainian shopping mall". British Prime Minister Boris Johnson condemned the "cruelty and barbarism" of the attack and conveyed condolences to the civilians affected, also reaffirming support for Ukraine.

Ukrainian president Volodymyr Zelenskyy said in his address that the attack targeted the shopping centre intentionally. Ukraine's Foreign Minister, Dmytro Kuleba tweeted that "The attack was a disgrace to humanity and that Russia must face consequences in the form of more heavy arms to Ukraine and more sanctions against Russia." Mayor Vitalii Maletskyi stated the attack hit an area that was "100% certain not to have any links to the armed forces." He called the attack a crime against humanity, and accused Russia of intentionally shelling a central residential area when there were a lot of people around as an intimidation tactic.

== Coverage in Russia ==
On the day of the attack, Russian television did not report it until the Russian Ministry of Defense confirmed that it had happened. Pro-Russian Telegram channels have spread multiple conflicting theories about the missile strike, including the claim that the missile was aimed at a car factory near the mall, that the mall was being used as a military equipment warehouse, or as a base of the Territorial Defense Forces, and that the missile strike is a Ukrainian provocation involving the use of "canned bodies".

On the day after the attack, Russian authorities and state-controlled media issued a number of contradictory statements about the attack, including claims that the attack was "fake" and that the Ukrainians had bombed the mall themselves. Russian Defense Ministry spokesman Igor Konashenkov said that "Russian Aerospace Forces delivered a strike by air-launched high-precision weapons against hangars of weapons and ammunition from the United States and European countries in the area of the Kremenchuk road machinery factory" He also said: "The detonation of the munitions for western weaponry in storage led to a fire in a non-functioning shopping centre next to the factory." These statements have been debunked by the BBC and other media.

== Aftermath ==
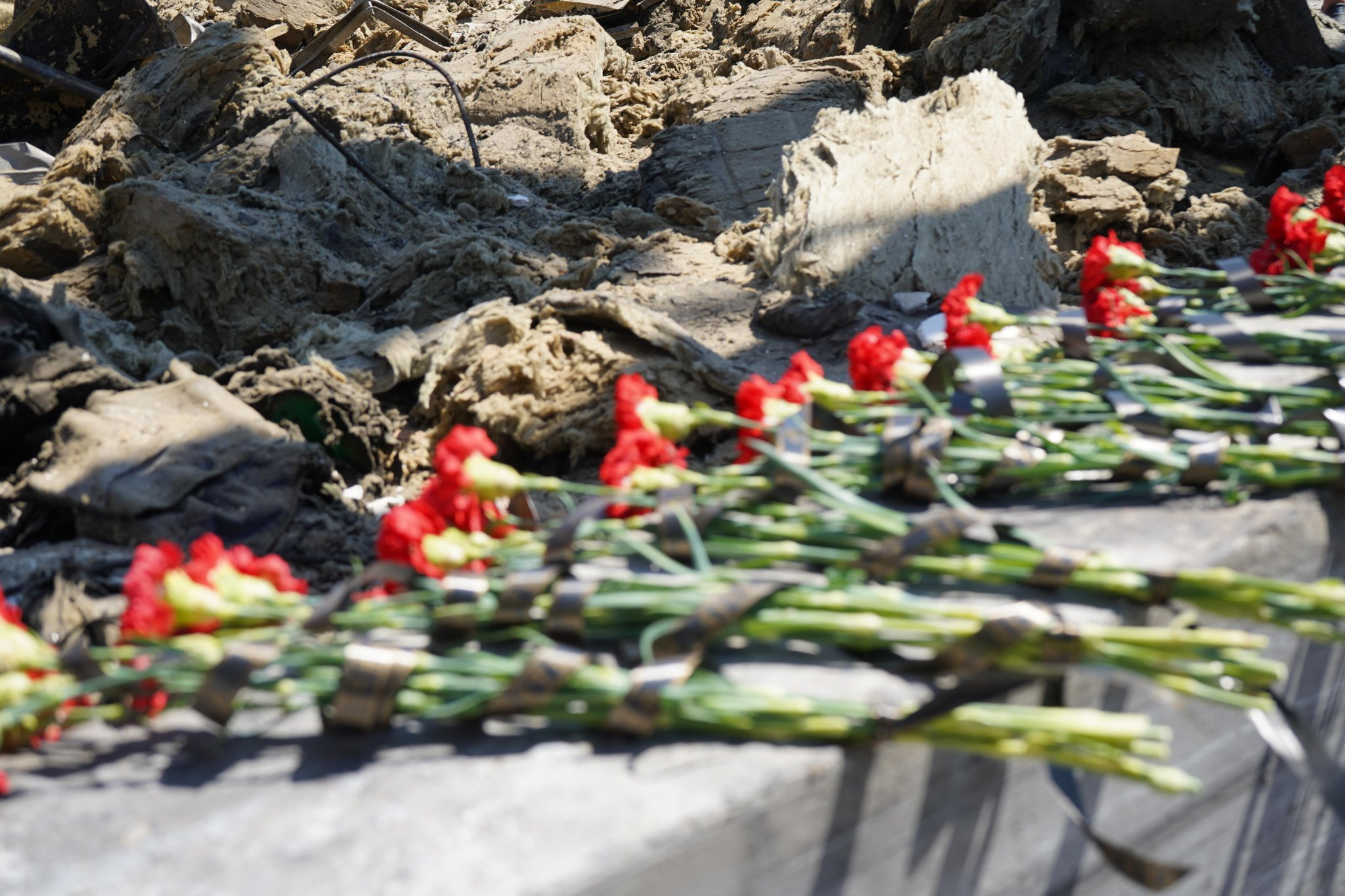
Flowers at the memorial

A memorial to those who died in the attack and were wounded was quickly set up near the ruins of the buildings. Residents left items such as lit candles and flowers at the memorial, while others prayed or waited to hear about those still missing from the attack. A three-day period of official mourning was declared in the city.

On 20 October 2024, the Shaykovka air base chief of staff and bomber pilot responsible for multiple recent attacks on civilian infrastructure in Ukraine, was found dead in an apple orchard in Bryansk Oblast, Russia, apparently a targeted assassination. Dmitri Golenkov was reportedly responsible for the missile attacks on the Kremenchuk shopping mall, and for the Dnipro apartment building airstrike which killed 46 people in January 2023 in Dnipro.

== See also ==
- Attacks on civilians in the Russian invasion of Ukraine
- Kramatorsk railway station attack
- Kyiv shopping centre bombing
- Timeline of the Russian invasion of Ukraine
- War crimes in the Russian invasion of Ukraine
