= Zakhidenergo =

Ukrainian energy company

Zakhidenergo «Західенерго»
- Type: Public
- Traded as: PFTS: ZAEN
- Industry: power generation
- Headquarters: Lviv, Ukraine
- Key people: Rinat Akhmetov (CEO)
- Revenue: ▲$186 million USD
- Number of employees: 9,205
- Parent: Government of Ukraine (29.84%); DTEK (70.16%)
- Website: http://www.zakhidenergo.ua

Zakhidenergo (Ukrainian: «Західенерго») is a major electric and thermal energy producing companies in western Ukraine. The electricity generated by the company is supplied to Ukrainian consumers and exported to European countries. The company also includes Burshtyn TES, Ladyzhyn TES and Dobrotvirska TES, as well as service companies Galremenergo, Lvivenergospetsremont, Lvivenergoavtotrans, Zahidenergopostach.

Since July 1, 2002, Burshtyn TES has been operating on the island of Burshtyn TES, in the unified European energy system UCTE / CENTREL, providing coverage of the island's own consumption and transfer of 500 MW of power for export. The island, which forms the Burshtyn TES together with the adjacent network, covers an area of 27,000 km^{2} with a population of about 3 million people.

PJSC DTEK Zahidenergo is the fifth-largest energy generating company in Ukraine with an installed capacity of 4,707.5 MW, which is about 9% of the total electricity capacity of Ukraine. In terms of electricity production, PJSC DTEK Zahidenergo occupies one of the leading positions among thermal energy generating companies.

== History ==
The beginning of large-scale development of electric power in Western Ukraine was the construction of Dobrotvirska TES. From 1951 to 1959, 25 MW, 50 MW, 100 MW and two 150 MW power units were put into operation at the station. The formation of Western Ukrainian energy took place as part of BEO Lvivenergo, which united TESs, regional enterprises of electric networks (with main and distribution networks), and energy repair enterprises. The main direction of development was to increase the unit capacity and improve the efficiency of equipment.

In 1962-1969 Burshtyn TES with 200 MW power units was put into operation.

Lvivenergo became the first company of the former USSR to build and operate a nuclear power plant – Rivne NPP, the first power unit of which was introduced in December 1979.

OJSC "Zakhidenergo" was established in 1995, in accordance with the Presidential Decree of 04.04.95 No. 282 "On structural adjustment in the power complex of Ukraine", on the basis of thermal power plants BEO "Lvivenergo" – Burshtyn and Dobrotvirska TES, as well as Ladyzhyn TES, which was a part of BEO "Vinnytsiaenergo". OJSC "Zahidenergo" has inherited the high technical level of BEO and the most qualified personnel.

Pursuant to the decision of the regular General Meeting of Shareholders held on March 22, 2011, Zakhidenergo Open Joint-Stock Company was renamed Zakhidenergo Public Joint-Stock Company.

== Ownership ==
Rinat Akhmetov, who had a 25.06% stake in Zakidenergo, acquired an additional 45.103% stake in November 2011, inexpensively, through his holding DTEK.

== Structure ==
- Burshtyn TES
- Dobrotvir TES
- Ladyzhyn TES

== See also ==
- Ministry of Fuel and Energy (Ukraine)
