= Donbasenergo =

Regional power company in eastern Ukraine

- Native name: Донбасенерго
- Company type: Public
- Traded as: PFTS: DOEN; UA:DOEN
- Industry: Electricity
- Founded: 1995
- Headquarters: Kyiv, Ukraine
- Products: Electric power
- Revenue: 1,513,885,000 hryvnia (2025)
- Total assets: 6,514,212,000 hryvnia (2025)
- Website: www.de.com.ua

Donbasenergo (Ukrainian: Донбасенерго) is a regional power generation company operating in the eastern part of Ukraine. The company was established in 1995 as a result of restructuring of the Ukrainian power sector. It owns and operates power stations in Slovyansk (880 MW) and Starobesheve (1,685 MW), Donetsk Oblast. The total installed capacity of the company is 2,820 MW and it has 4.6% market share of the Ukrainian electricity market and 11.6% share of the Ukrainian heat market.

The major shareholder of Donbasenergo is Energoinvest Holding with 60.773% of shares. The state holding Energy Company of Ukraine owns 25% of shares. It is listed at the PFTS Ukraine Stock Exchange.

== Privatization ==
Majority shares of Donbasenergo were privatized in August 2013 to Energoinvest Holding, a subsidiary of Energoinvest Holding B.V. registered in the Netherlands. It won the privatization only two months after its establishment.

Up until August 8, 2013 the Dutch offshore company Energoinvest Holding Joint-stock company was owned by Ukrainian coal mining company Krasnolimansk whose owner is Igor Gumenuk. Gumenuk is a known business partner of former President Victor Yanukovich and previously Rinat Akhmetov. Energoinvest Holding BV has been owned since August 2013 at 100% by British Whitebridge Resources Limited, established in 2003. The latter has been well known as the largest importer of Ukrainian metal in the UK exporting it to European businesses. Whitebridge Resources Limited has been used by members of Ukrainian establishment and donors of Party of Regions not only for exports to offshore companies at lowered prices, but also to import raw materials and equipment to Ukraine by specially inflated prices". It has been described as a tax-free enterprise, that may be used for money laundering derived from Ukrainian exports and imports.
