= 2022 Kyiv shopping centre bombing =

Russian attack on mall in Ukraine

Kyiv shopping centre bombing
- Part of the Kyiv strikes in the battle of Kyiv during the Russian invasion of Ukraine
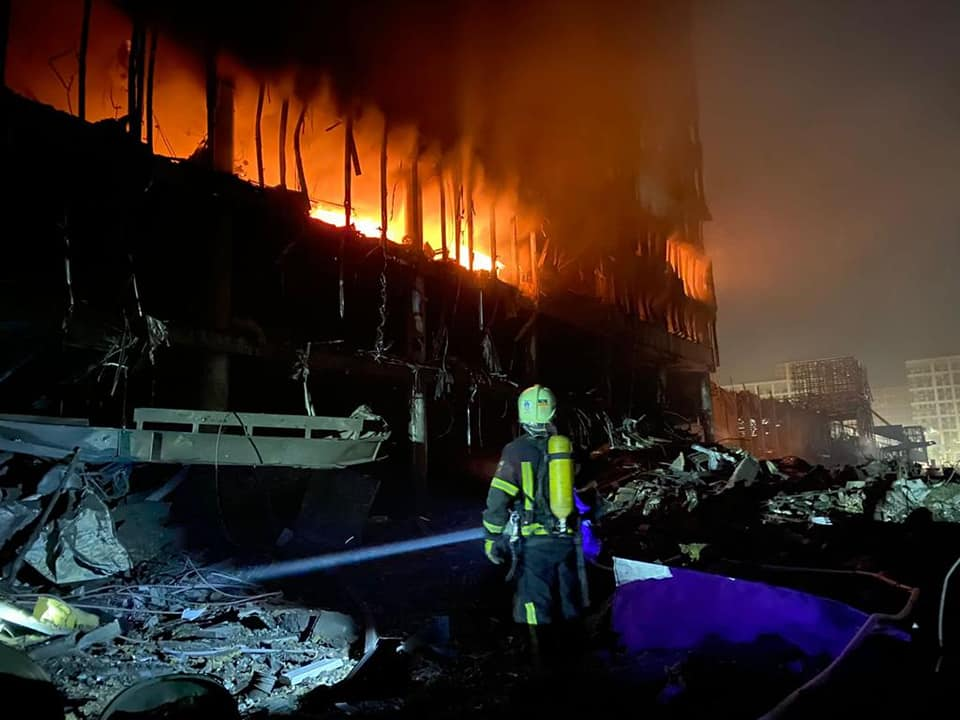
- The shopping centre on fire after the airstrike
- Location: 50.504678°N 30.416758°E; Retroville shopping centre Kyiv, Ukraine
- Date: 20 March 2022; ~22:48 (UTC+2)
- Target: Grad MLRS and resupply vehicles in the parking space.
- Attack type: Missile strike
- Weapon: 9K720 Iskander
- Deaths: 8+
- Perpetrator: Russian Ground Forces
- Motive: Destroy Ukrainian ammunitions storage (stated by Russia)

On 20 March 2022 around 10:45 pm, the Retroville, a shopping centre located in Kyiv, Ukraine, was bombed in a Russian airstrike. Part of the mall along with its 12-storey business center were destroyed. At least eight people were killed, six of whom were dressed in military fatigues, and one of whom was Russian journalist Oksana Baulina. According to the Russian government, the shopping centre was used as a cover to store and reload ammunition, including the BM-21 Grad multiple rocket launchers by Ukraine.

== Background ==
Russian Armed Forces invaded Ukraine on 24 February 2022, launching an offensive into Kyiv Oblast, entering from Belarus. A battle in the city began on the following day.

The Retroville mall measured 120,334 cubic metres (4,249,600 cu ft) in size, had area of 86,000 square metres (930,000 sq ft) and housed more than 250 shops. The mall was completed in May 2020. It is managed by BT Invest, a Lithuanian investment company.

== Bombing ==
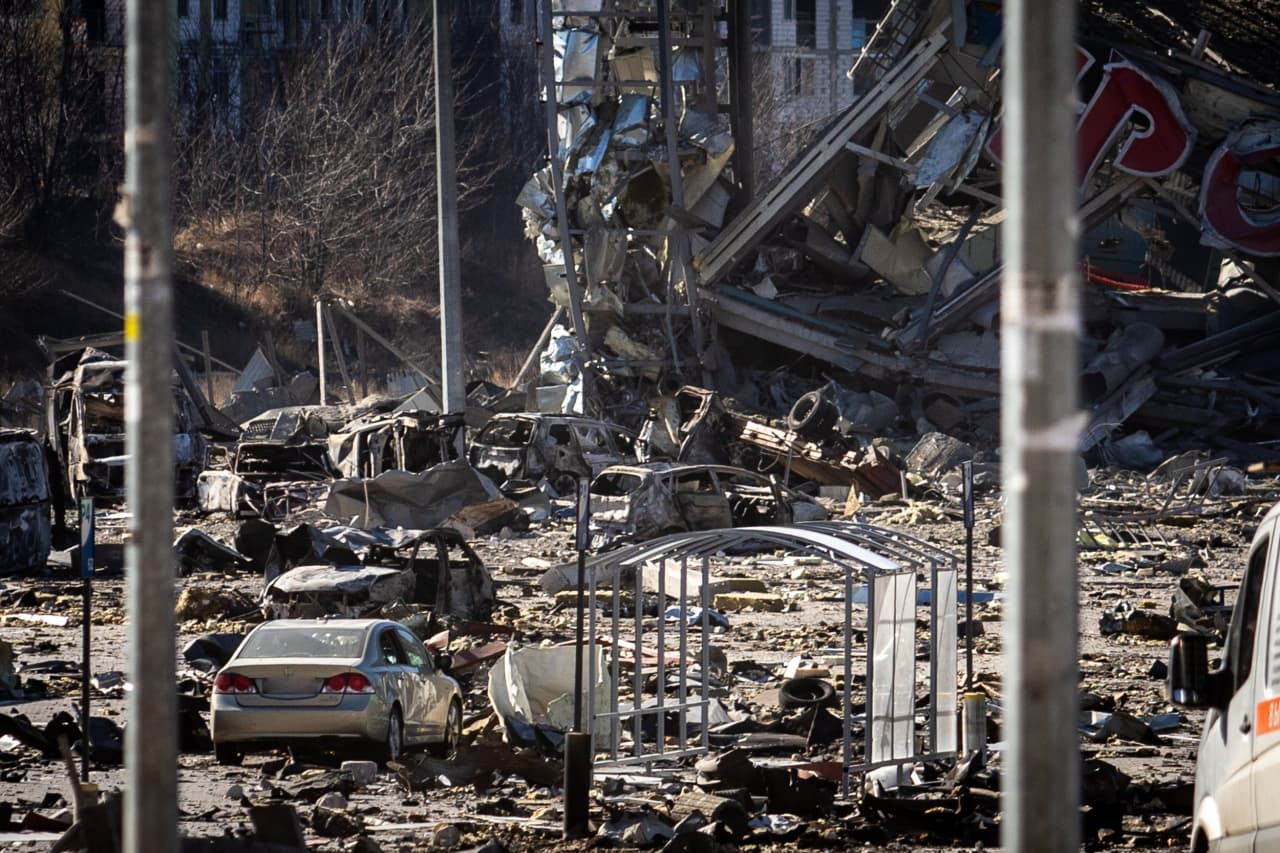
Aftermath of the bombing

During the evening of 20 March 2022, Russian Armed Forces bombed Retroville. Ukrainian emergency services received reports of a fire at the shopping centre at 22:48.

The mall was largely destroyed, as were nearby cars, Sport Life fitness club and a business centre. Kyiv mayor Vitali Klitschko announced that nearby buildings were badly damaged and at least eight people were killed.

The company headquarters of supermarket chain Novus, located in the business centre, was "almost completely destroyed". (Note: Novus is also a project of the Lithuanian investment group BT Invest.) Their flagship supermarket, located in the shopping centre, was also affected, and suffered collapsed ceilings and other structural damage. (Note: At the time the loss of the headquarters was reported, the full extent of the damage to the flagship supermarket could not be determined due to restricted access to the site.)

== Targeting ==
The Russian Ministry of Defence said it launched the strike because the shopping centre was used as a cover to store and reload ammunition, including the BM-21 Grad multiple rocket launchers, by the Armed Forces of Ukraine and provided drone footage of what the Ministry described as a Ukrainian Multiple Launch Rocket System (MLRS) firing and moving back to the shopping centre, before being destroyed by a Russian missile. The day after the strike, Ukrainian authorities detained a man who they said shared footage showing Ukrainian military vehicles parked near the shopping centre on TikTok in late February, and warned Ukrainians not to publish information on Ukrainian military movements.

== See also ==
- 2022 Kremenchuk missile strike
