= Burshtyn TPP =

Coal-fired power plant in Burshtyn, Halych Raion, Ivano-Frankivsk Oblast, Ukraine

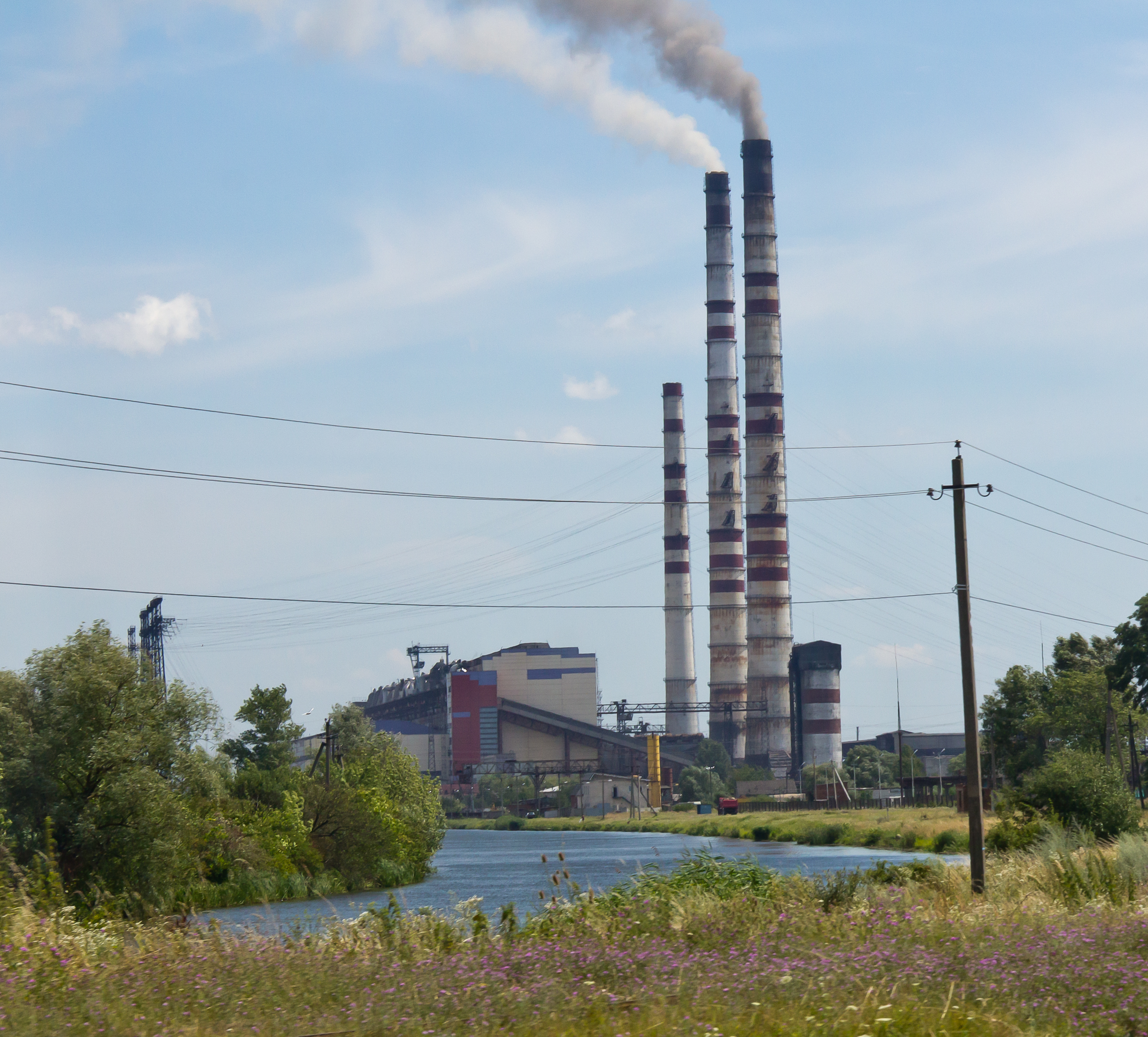
- Chimneys of Burshtyn coal-fired power station
- Country: Ukraine
- Location: Ivano-Frankivsk Raion, Ivano-Frankivsk Oblast
- Coordinates: 49°12′37.38″N 24°39′59.53″E
- Status: Operational
- Construction began: 1962
- Commission date: 1969
- Owner: Zakhidenergo
- Operators: Lvivenergo (1969–1995); Zakhidenergo (1995-present)

Thermal power station
- Primary fuel: Coal
- Secondary fuel: Natural gas
- Tertiary fuel: Fuel oil

Power generation
- Units operational: 1×208 MW, 3×206 MW, 3×185 MW, 7×195 MW
- Nameplate capacity: 2,334 MW

External links
- Website: www.dtek.com
- Commons: Related media on Commons

Burshtyn TPP is a coal-fired power plant of Zakhidenergo located in Ivano-Frankivsk Raion 6 kilometres (3.7 mi) south-east from Burshtyn, Ivano-Frankivsk Oblast, Ukraine. It was built in the Soviet era and is now part of Rinat Akhmetov's holdings.

The plant has two chimneys which were built in 1966 are also used as high-voltage pylon. The plant has 12 units with a total installed capacity of 2,334 MW. It has a 330 kV double-circuit connection to the 750/330 kV substation called ZahidnoUkrainska (WestUkraine).

The rest of Ukraine was connected to the Soviet-era IPS/UPS network (effectively controlled by Russia) until early 2022, when it switched to the synchronous grid of Continental Europe, controlled by European Network of Transmission System Operators for Electricity (ENTSO-E). The part of the Ukrainian power grid called Burshtyn Island has been connected to the European grid since 2003. The power plant holds the frequency and phase angle in the Island. The power plant has a 400 kV connection to the Hungarian, Slovak and Romanian grid via the substation at Mukachevo.

== History ==
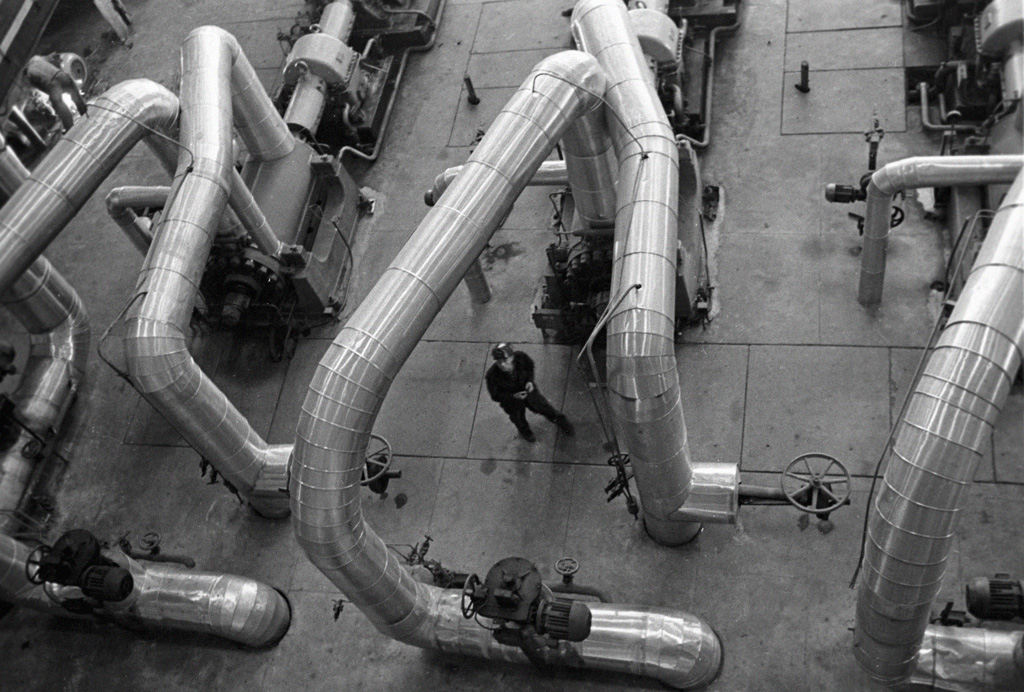
Boiler room at Burshtynska power station (1974)

The Burshtyn TPP (formerly Burshtyn GRES, renamed in 1996) was built by the Soviet Union from 1962 to 1969. The plant was built using concrete block technology. The equipments of the plant were manufactured by more than one hundred companies. In 1965, first gas-fired power unit having a total power of 200 MW were finished. In 1969, the twelfth unit was finished and the plant has been launched into service for "Lvivenergo" with a total capacity of 2,300 MW. Among some other power stations of the company were Dobrotvir TPP and Rivne Nuclear Power Plant. In 1975, a computer-based monitoring system was installed. From 1978 to 1980, to reduce pollutant emission, electrostatic ash filters were added to the plant. The ash from filters is used by the building industry to produce cement. In 1984, all of the 12 units has been modified to be able to be fired with natural gas. From 1985 to 1990, the power units no. 9 and 10 has been equipped with asynchronous-synchronous turbogenerators type ASTG-200. This helps to reduce reactive power and increase efficiency and stability. From 1995, according to a presidential order, the power plant became an independent organization and part of the power generating open joint-stock company Zakhidenergo that included Dobrotvir TPP and Ladyzhyn TPP (part of the former "Vinnytsiaenergo").

=== 2022 Russian-Ukrainian war ===
The power plant was struck by four Russian missiles on 10 October 2022, amidst massive missile strike on Ukraine.

On the night of March 22, 2024, Burshtyn TPP was struck by the Russian missiles and UAVs. All blocks were damaged, with the extent of damage varies from "more than 50% damaged" to complete destruction. According to DTEK executive director Dmytro Sakharuk, reconstruction may require 6 months to 2 years of time and international support to complete.

In June 2024, it was revealed that the Burshtyn TPP was heavily damaged after Russian missile attacks. However, the CEO of DTEK Energy (the owner and operator of the Burshtyn TPP) stated that the power plant will be repaired.

== The Burshtyn Island ==
From 1 July 2002, the power plant and several substations connected to it have been disconnected from the IPS power system of Ukraine. The plant, with these substations, and customers served by the plant/substations together called "Burshtyn Island". The island connects also the 200 MW Kaluska CHPP gas power plant and 27 MW Tereblia-Rikska hydro station, both synchronized to BuTPP (Burshtyn TPP). The island is synchronized and connected to the ENTO-E/UCTE grid via the power systems of Slovakia, Hungary and Romania with 220 kV, 400 kV and 750 kV transmission lines. The purpose of the island is to accelerate the integration of the Ukrainian IPS into the ENTSO-E Continental Europe region.

Connections of the power plant
Voltage	No. of circuits	Destination
400 kV	1	substation 400/220/110 kV Mukacheve (Power Island UCTE)
330 kV	1	substation 750/330 kV (Power Island UCTE)
330 kV	1	substation 750/330 kV ZahidnoUkrainska (Power net Ukraine)
330 kV	1	substation 330/110 kV Ivano-Frankivs'k (Power net Ukraine)
330 kV	1	substation 330/110 kV Ternopil (Power net Ukraine)
220 kV	2	substation Stryj 220/110/35 kV (Power Island UCTE)
220 kV	2	substation Kalush 220/110/35 kV (Power Island UCTE)

== Fuel supplement ==
The most common fuel of the plant is coal, which is from Lviv Voliny coalfield, but coal from Donetsk is also used. The plant is also fueled with natural gas and petroleum. The plant can provide higher efficiency with non-solid fuel, because it does not make ash. The coolant water is supplied from a water catchment lake with a surface of 2000 hectares (approx. 50 million cubic meters).

== Flue gas stacks ==
The two largest flue gas stacks are 250 metres (820 ft) tall and serve as electricity pylons for the outgoing lines.

== See also ==
- Zakhidenergo
- Rzeszów–Khmelnytskyi powerline
