= PFTS Ukraine Stock Exchange =

Stock exchange located in Kyiv, Ukraine

PFTS Ukraine Stock Exchange ПАТ "Фондова бiржа ПФТС"
- Public JSC 'Stock exchange PFTS'
- Type: Public JSC
- Location: Kyiv, Ukraine
- Founded: 1996
- Currency: Ukrainian hryvnia
- Market cap: $140 billion
- Indices: PFTS index
- Website: https://pfts.ua/en/

The Public JSC PFTS Stock Exchange is a leading stock exchange in Ukraine that for a long time (until 2006) legally was considered as a trading system, hence its name the First Stock Trading System (Ukrainian abbr. PFTS).

The trading occurs on working days between 10:00 and 17:15 Kyiv time (UTC+2). The PFTS index is calculated based on the results of the trading. Daily trade volume is about $30–60 million. Approximately 220 companies are listed on the PFTS, with a total market capitalization around $140 billion. For comparison, United States New York Stock Exchange capitalization is worth $25 trillion.

The PFTS Stock Trading System has been in operation since 1996 and currently is the largest marketplace and self-regulatory organization in Ukraine's stock market.

Originally it was the Association of the professional participants of the Ukraine stock market «Outside of Stock Exchange Share Trade System» (Ukrainian: Позабіржова Фондова Торговельна Система, ПФТС), registered at the end of 1995. In September, 1998 the name «First Stock Trade System» (Ukrainian: Перша Фондова Торговельна Система, ПФТС, PFTS) was accepted, effectively keeping the Ukrainian abbreviation of the name PFTS unchanged.

Members of the Stock Exchange accounted for over 150 companies in 2010, headquarters of most of them located in Kyiv. The Stock exchange list accounts for nearly 800 entities with eleven of them classified under the first level of listing, 143 - the second level of listing, and the rest have assigned zero level of listing.

The most expensive securities was issued by Agra LLC (ЗАТ "Агра") based in Dnipro. Its 13 bonds nominated at ₴770 000 in 2010. Swedbank has the most securities with 215,910,025,800 shares nominated at ₴0.01.

== See also ==
- PFTS index
- Ukrainian Exchange
- Stock exchanges in Ukraine
