= Ukrainian Universal Exchange =

Commodity exchange located in Poltava, Ukraine

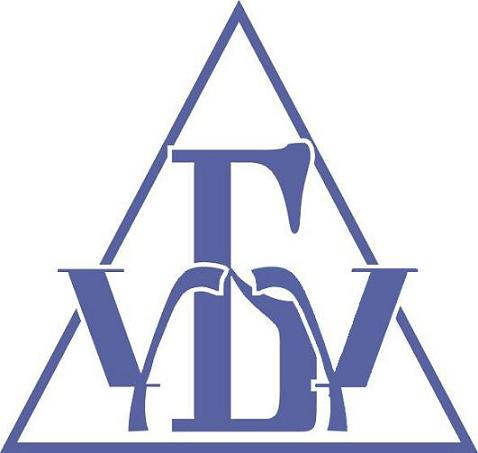
- Type: Commodity exchange
- Founded: 1997
- Headquarters: Ukraine, 36039, Poltava, 52 Shevchenko str.
- Website: Official website

Ukrainian Universal Exchange (UUE) — a Ukrainian company, commodity exchange, which is represented in several regions of Ukraine. June 2015 - the largest exchange in Ukraine.

== History ==
The Exchange was established on October 7, 1997 with the aim of taking an active part in market transformation of economy of Ukraine and is one of the first professional organizations in Ukraine, which began to provide a full range of exchange services.

2004 — by the decree of the CMU "On granting of powers for the implementation of the decommissioned military property of the Armed Forces" dated 13.12.2004, No. 894-p, the exchange has the authority to implement written off military property of the Armed Forces.

2011 — received a license to conduct land trades — series АГ № 583015 dated 14.01.2011 for the sale of land and lease rights. 2012 — by the results of the competition held by the State Taxation Administration, UUE is added to the list of authorized exchanges which can conclude contracts with the Taxation Administration on sale of the taxpayer’s property which is being in the tax lien (STA letter dated 05.01.2012 № 261/6/19-9015 ).

2012 — this year the UUE is one of 4 exchanges authorized by the Ministry of Economic Development regarding the electronic exchange trading on sale of coal products according to the results of the contest.

2013 — contract No. 365 dated 22.10.2013 with The State Property Fund of Ukraine on sale of property in state and communal property..

2014 — by the results of the competition by The State Property Fund of Ukraine, the UUE recognized as the winner in managing auctions on disposal of state property objects.

2014 — receive a Certificate of assessment activity No. 16049/14 by The State Property Fund of Ukraine.

2014 — UUE determined as the winner and the sole organizer of spot trades on sale of Crude oil, gas condensate and liquefied gas production by state-owned companies.

2014 — UUE became a member of the Association of exchanges and electronic platform.

2015 — by the decision of the DGF Executive Directorate No. 005/15 — UUE was included in the list of enterprises which have the right to provide services by persons authorized by the Fund in the removal of insolvent Banks from the market or liquidation of the Bank.

== Activity area of the company ==
The main activity areas of the Exchange are:

- organization and holding exchange and open trades (Auctions) on:
  - sale of crude oil, gas condensate of equity production and liquefied gas, including for the population needs;
  - sales of state and municipal property, state-owned and registered of organizers of the auctions for the disposal of state property (cooperation with the authorities of the privatization of Ukraine, ministries and departments, local governments at all levels);
  - sale of taxpayer’s assets in tax lien;
  - sale of land parcels and lease rights;
  - sales of unprocessed timber;
  - sales of military surplus and decommissioned assets;
  - sale of confiscated and abandoned property (which became the property of the state);
  - sales of wholesale products of Ukrainian enterprises;
  - sale of fixed assets (sale of illiquid assets, scrap and surplus property, are not considered fixed assets (Inventory);
  - sale of property of bankrupt enterprises at all stages;
  - sale of bank collateral, determining the value of a property, search of potential clients;
- Registering of internal and international contracts for the export of agricultural products.
- Grain trade. One of the market makers on this market is the Agrarian Fund of Ukraine.
- Conducting market research to determine demand and supply, the pricing policy of individual species and groups of goods /services on the territory of Ukraine and abroad.
- Services on organization and holding of tenders, calls including electronic.
- Provision of auctioneer services for exchange and open trades.
- Provision of independent, expert and monetary evaluation of the property.
- Providing advice on the above matters.

== Performance results ==
- During the business year (June 2013 — June 2014) UUE in different directions enclosed more than 3229 exchange agreements on over ₴3.6 billion.
- According to the State Statistics Committee of Ukraine "On the activities of the exchanges of Ukraine” in 2008-2009 UUE ranked first in terms of trading volumes and was the first in the list of commodity exchanges Accredited by the Ministry of Agrarian Policy by value of transactions for agricultural products, processed products and food.
- UUE occupies the leading places on the volume of sales of coal and agricultural products, unprocessed timber, crude oil, gas condensate and liquefied gas.
- Price indices (quotes) of the UUE used by tax authorities for the purpose of determining transfer prices.
- Ukrainian universal exchange is authorized by the Deposit Guarantee Fund for banks property sale. The Bank collateral property is sold via the electronic trading platform (ETP) of the UUE.
- Amount of sales in January - March 2015:
  - Liquefied gas - ₴289,041,249.58.
  - Condensate - ₴97,299,197.27.
  - Natural gas - ₴607,183,031.24.
  - Oil - ₴128,000.
  - Oil products - ₴30,246,300.

== Branches and representational offices ==
The Exchange is represented in major economically developed regions of Ukraine: Kiev, Dnepropetrovsk, Zaporizhzhia, Kremenchug, Odesa, Poltava, Sumy, Kharkiv, Kherson and has a large number of offices. Addresses of branches.

== Sources ==
- Ukrainian universal exchange — official web-site
- Normative documents of the exchange
- Normative acts
- Licenses
- Diplomas
- Quotes
- Press release for the 1st quarter of 2015
- Ukrainian universal exchange intensively develops electronic exchange trading
