= Sloviansk Raion =

Former subdivision of Donetsk Oblast, Ukraine

Slovianskskyi Raion Слов'янський район
- Raion
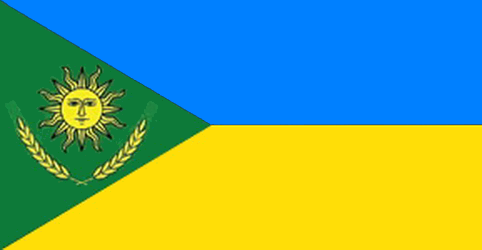
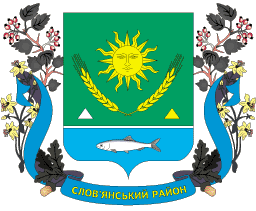
- Flag Coat of arms

- Coordinates: 48°54′56.5″N 37°43′18″E
- Country: Ukraine
- Region: Donetsk Oblast
- Established: 1923
- Disestablished: 18 July 2020
- Admin. center: Sloviansk
- Subdivisions: List: — city councils; 4 — settlement councils; 12 — rural councils; Number of localities: — cities; 4 — urban-type settlements; 40 — villages; 2 — rural settlements

Government
  - Governor: Petro Belokonov

Area
  - Total: 1,274 km^{2} (492 sq mi)

Population (2020)
  - Total: 45,917 ▼
  - Density: 36.04/km^{2} (93.35/sq mi)
- Time zone: UTC+02:00 (EET)
  - Summer (DST): UTC+03:00 (EEST)
- Postal index: 84100-84196
- Area code: +380 6262

Sloviansk Raion (Ukrainian: Слов'янський район) was a raion of Donetsk Oblast, located in southeastern Ukraine. The administrative center of the district was the city of Sloviansk, which was separately incorporated as a city of oblast significance and did not belong to the raion. The raion was abolished on 18 July 2020 as part of the administrative reform of Ukraine, which reduced the number of raions of Donetsk Oblast to eight, of which only five were controlled by the government. The last estimate of the raion population was 45,917 (2020 est.).

== Demographics ==
According to the 2001 Ukrainian Census:

Ethnicity		
Ukrainians	34,121	87.1%
Russians	4,115	10.5%
Turks	197	0.5%
Belarusians	178	0.5%
Romani people	133	0.3%

== 2014 fighting ==
On 2 May 2014, armed clashes were reported in and around Sloviansk with reported casualties, including killed and wounded, and downed helicopters.
