= Ukrainian Exchange =

Stock exchange in Kyiv, Ukraine

The Ukrainian Exchange
- Type: Stock exchange
- Location: Kyiv, Ukraine
- Founded: 15 May 2008
- Key people: Artem Yershov (CEO)
- Currency: Ukrainian hryvnia (UAH)
- No. of listings: 88 (January 2022)
- Market cap: US$4.4 billion (Jan 2022)
- Volume: US$120 million (Jan 2022)
- Indices: UX Index (UAX) 1738.24 (4 January 2022)
- Website: www.ux.ua

The Ukrainian Exchange (Ukrainian: Українська біржа [ʊkrɐˈjinʲsʲkɐ ˈbirʒɐ]; Russian: Украинская биржа) was founded on 15 May 2008 and its operation premises are situated at 7g, Tropinina Street, Kyiv.

The Exchange is one of the largest stock exchanges in Ukraine. The exchange is located in Kyiv, Ukraine's capital city, and was the main trading venue for equities and derivatives in Ukraine. It is under the jurisdiction of the Ministry of Finance of Ukraine.

Due to the 2022 Russian Invasion of Ukraine, it has temporarily stopped its operation and suspended additional workloads. It also encouraged citizens and businesses to sell Russian roubles, stocks and bonds in order to help defend and repel the Russian invasion.

In June 2024, National Securities and Stock Market Commission, the regulatory body of Ukrainian stock market, revoked the licenses of Ukrainian Exchange, because "the owner of a significant interest in the licensee, has among the owners of a significant interest a person who was sanctioned in accordance with the Law of Ukraine on Sanctions."

== History ==
In May 2008 the largest participants of the Ukrainian securities market signed the Memorandum of Understanding with the RTS Stock Exchange to create a new exchange in Kyiv.

51% of stocks of the exchange were bought by the Ukrainian broker/dealers, 49% – by the RTS Stock Exchange.

In October 2008 the Ukrainian Exchange was registered as a legal entity.

In December 2008 the State Commission of Ukraine (the state regulator for Securities and Stock market at that time) granted the UX a license of a stock exchange.

The official trading started on 26 March 2009 with over 80 of the most liquid Ukrainian stocks.

On 27 April 2009 the Ukrainian stock index (UX) was launched as the first on-line index in Ukraine. The first value as of 26, March 2009 was 500 and the initial basket consisted of 10 most liquid blue chips.

On 14 May 2009, the Ukrainian Exchange launched its repo market using an RTS Plaza system .

On 16 September 2009, the Central Counterparty (CCP) technology was introduced to provide investors with anonymity in settlement.

On 27 May 2010 the Ukrainian Exchange opened the first ever derivatives market in Ukraine. The first traded instrument was a futures contract on the UX Index.

As of October 2010, 160 professional brokerage companies were registered by the exchange. 23 of them provide direct market access to the exchange for their clients.

On 26 April 2011 the Ukrainian Exchange launched trading in options contracts.

In January 2015 the new futures on USDUAH, EURUSD and gold price were launched

In 1Q 2016 Dragon Capital and UNIVER Investment Group bought out from Moscow Exchange its stake in UX

On 19 December 2016 Ukrainian Exchange launched two new futures contracts – on index of Bitcoin and on price of Brent crude oil.

On 2 May 2018 CNSD's Decision provides for application of restrictive measures to and against certain Ukrainian entities that use the software produced by Moscow Exchange. Such Software is used, in particular, by Ukrainian Exchange and professional securities brokers and dealers, which are participants of the Ukrainian Exchange. From 18 June 2018 Ukrainian exchange switch trading to bilateral trade reporting.

After the commencement of the 2022 Russian Invasion on February 24, it announced on the same day its suspension of activities as well as daily operations. In its official site, it encouraged people to sell Russian roubles, stocks, bonds, ETFs, ADRs and GDRs to support the resistance against the imminent Russian advance.

On 2 March, restricted trading is resumed in the form of military government bonds to continue financing the Armed Forces of Ukraine.

== Products and services ==
=== Equities ===
Trading technologies implemented on The Ukrainian Exchange:

- order-driven market,
- quote-driven market,
- repo market.

==== Fixed-Income ====
In a bid to improve the technological capabilities and to expand its list of trade instruments, the Ukrainian Exchange offers access to the market of internal government loan bonds (government bonds). Order prices are quoted as a percentage of the bonds’ face value. All orders submitted to the order book are binding offers. When a trade is executed its value includes the accrued interest calculated for the specified final settlement date. Minimum lot – ₴10,000. In order to be admitted to trading on the government bonds market exchange members must register at least one customer code or proprietary trading code linked to an account in the depository National Bank of Ukraine.

=== Derivatives ===
The derivatives market on the Ukrainian Exchange was launched on 27 May 2010. It operates on the trading platform provided by Russian Trading System with its proven collateral system and Central Counterparty guarantees, which has been operating successfully in Russia and demonstrated its capability during more than one crisis. Before June 2018, the Ukrainian Exchange trades contracts on the following underlyings:

- UX Index (Ukrainian equities market benchmark);
- US Dollar to Ukrainian Hryvnia exchange rate;
- Euro to US Dollar exchange rate;
- Gold price;
- Brent crude oil price;
- Bitcoin price;
- Corn price;
- Wheat price.

=== Privatization auctions ===
The Ukrainian Exchange holds trading in block of stocks of open joint stock companies in a form of a privatization auctions in accordance with "Provisions on the order for sale on the exchange stocks of the open joint stock companies owned by the state" and Trading Rules on The Ukrainian Exchange. The State Property Fund of Ukraine acts at the auctions as a Seller, and both legal entities and individuals who in accordance with the current legislation of Ukraine have a right for acquisition of property in the process of privatization can act as Buyers. In order to become a buyer at the privatization auction on The Ukrainian Exchange, residents need to fill in the documents, given below. Non-residents can contact one of members of exchange. Privatization auctions on The Ukrainian Exchange take place every Tuesday. The Exchange informs of the date and time of an auction on its website well in advance.

== See also ==
- Stock exchange
- Clearing house (finance)
- Central Counterparty Clearing
- Economy of Ukraine
