= Dnieper reservoir cascade =

Series of reservoirs, locks, and HEP plants in Ukraine

Coordinates: 49.94°N 33.62°E

A map of the Dnieper reservoir cascade

The Dnieper reservoir cascade (Ukrainian: Дніпровський каскад гідроелектростанцій, romanized: Dniprovsʹkyy kaskad hidroelektrostantsiy) is a series of dams, reservoirs and hydroelectric power stations (HPPs) on the Dnieper in Ukraine. The first HPP on the Dnieper was built at Zaporizhzhia in the 1920s. It was created to prevent uncontrolled flooding, and improve water transportation infrastructure. In 2018, the reservoirs stored approximately 70% of Ukraine's fresh water resources. Water is used to cool nuclear power stations, in transport, for fisheries, by industrial and urban centres for numerous purposes, and to irrigate farmland. The cascade’s 900-kilometre-long (560 mi) shipping lane provides a navigation route from Kyiv to the Black Sea.

The first HPP provided energy for the armaments industries of southern Ukraine. In 1941, NKVD agents blew up the Dnieper Reservoir dam, supposedly in an attempt to hinder the German advance across Ukraine. The resulting explosion killed thousands of civilians and Red Army troops. It was rebuilt in 1947, and over the next two decades, three new HPPs were built. After Russian armed forces took control of the Kakhovka Dam at the start of the Russo-Ukrainian war, Ukrainian troops fortified the five other dams. On 6 June 2023, the Kakhovka Dam was breached; the reservoir has since drained away.

As a result of the construction of the reservoirs in the Dnieper cascade, many of the features of the river were permanently transformed, causing severe disruption to the hydrology of the Dnieper basin. Pollution levels worsened in the 1990s and there has been little improvement to the cascade since, in part as a result of mismanagement of the issue by the Ukrainian government, a situation that has attracted international criticism. The geoecological state of the cascade has been degraded by ecological and manmade causes (radioactive and chemical pollution, eutrophication, the increased risk of flooding, erosion, abrasion of the banks, silt accumulation, the increase of karst processes, increased evaporation, and waste from farmland). Many fish species have been adversely affected, and measures to re-establish fish populations have not been successfully implemented.

== Description and uses ==
The Dnieper reservoir cascade in Ukraine is a series of six dams, reservoirs and hydroelectric power stations (HPPs) on the Dnieper. Together with the Kyiv Pumped Storage Power Plant and the Dniester cascade hydroelectric power station, the Dnieper cascade was part of United Energy Systems of Ukraine until the company was closed down in 1997; the coordination and operation of all the dams on the Dnieper is now controlled by Ukrhydroenergo, a government-owned company. The cascade was created to prevent uncontrolled flooding, and to improve the region's water transportation infrastructure.

In 2018, the reservoirs together stored approximately 70% of all Ukraine's fresh water resources; the Dnieper supplies the fresh water needs of 30 million people. Water from the Dnieper is used in the to cool four nuclear power stations, in transport, and in fisheries. Its waters are used by 50 industrial and urban centres for numerous purposes, and 50 irrigation systems provide water for 1,312,900 hectares (3,244,000 acres) of farmland. The previously chronic water shortages incurred by industry in the Donets Basin and Kryvyy Rih were eradicated, and it became possible to irrigate farmland in southern Ukraine and Crimea.

Prior to 2023, the capacity of the cascade's HPPs (excluding the Kyiv pumped storage power plant) was 3,651,000 kilowatts (4,896,000 hp), and the average annual electricity production was 9,274,000,000 kilowatt-hours (3.339×10^{10} MJ). The Kyiv Pumped Storage Power Plant began operation in 1970. It can produce 235 MW and has an average annual electricity production of 135 GWh.

=== Hydrology ===
Dnieper reservoir cascade (longitudinal profile)

Before the Dnieper's reservoirs were built, the river flowed more slowly during the summer and the winter than during other times of the year. The dams along the river's course now cause the highest flows in spring and the lowest flows from September to March. Snowmelt from the river’s upper basin during the spring provides the greatest part of the annual discharge of water into the cascade. Ice that starts to form at the end of December begins to thaw in early March.The average annual flow of the river at its mouth is 1,700 cubic metres (59,000 cu ft) per second.

As a result of the construction of the reservoirs in the Dnieper cascade, many of the features of the river were transformed beyond recognition. The disruption of the hydrology of the Dnieper basin due to the construction of the cascade was severe, and the natural development of the Dnieper floodplain was permanently changed.

=== Infrastructure ===
The Dnieper reservoir cascade consists of six HPPs and one pumped storage power plant:

Power plant	Reservoir	location of dam	Built	map	Power / MW	Production / GW/h	Reservoir volume / Gm^{3}	Notes
Kyiv Hydroelectric Power Plant	Kyiv Reservoir	Vyshhorod	1960–1964	Kyiv Reservoir	408.5	750	1.17	-
Kaniv Hydroelectric Power Plant	Kaniv Reservoir	Kaniv	1963–1975	Kaniv Reservoir	444	930	0.28	-
Kremenchuk Hydroelectric Power Plant	Kremenchuk Reservoir			Kremenchuk Reservoir	625	1500	8.97	Due to its volume it can be used to increase electricity production at all downstream HPPs.
Middle Dnieper Hydroelectric Station	Kamianske Reservoir		1954–1960	Kamianske Reservoir	352	1290	0.53	-
Dnieper Hydroelectric Station	Dnieper Reservoir		1927–1932	Dnieper Reservoir	1538.2	3920	-	One of the largest HPPs in Eastern Europe. Rebuilt following its destruction during the Second World War; reconstructed in 1980
Kakhovka Hydroelectric Station	-	Nova Kakhovka	1950–1956	location of the Kakhovka Dam before 2023	-	-	-	Destroyed in June 2023; previous capacity 351MW.

=== Use as a transport route ===
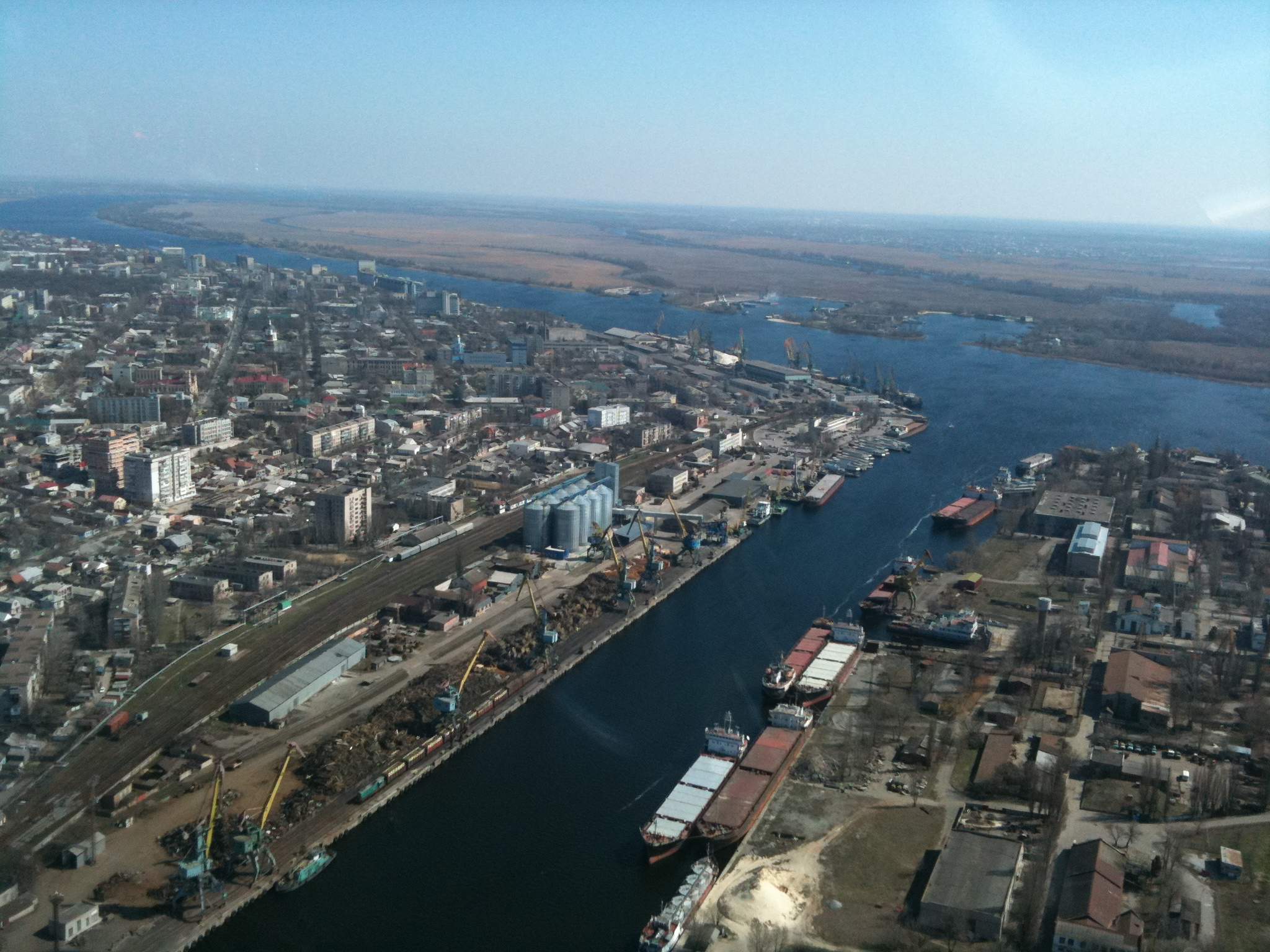
A panoramic view of the Kherson River Port

Locks were constructed at each of the cascade's HPPs to allow ships to navigate from the mouth of the River Pripyat to the Black Sea. The completion of the cascade thus created a 900-kilometre-long (560 mi) shipping lane. The channels and locks on the cascade have a width of 80 metres (260 ft), and a depth of 3.65 metres (12.0 ft). The shipping lane provided nine inland ports that can access the Black Sea:

- Kyiv River Port,
- Cherkasy River Port
- Kremenchuk River Port
- Kamianske River Port
- Dnipropetrovsk River Port
- Zaporizhzhia River Port
- Nikopol River Port
- Nova Kakhovka River Port
- Kherson River Port

Prior to the dissolution of the USSR, 50-60 million tons of goods were transported through the Dnieper locks water per year. A record number of ships passing through the cascade’s locks during the 1970s; almost 22,000 vessels passed through the Kaniv lock in 1974. The number of ships moving through the cascade significantly decreased during the 1990s.

== History ==
=== Obstacles to navigation along the Dnieper ===
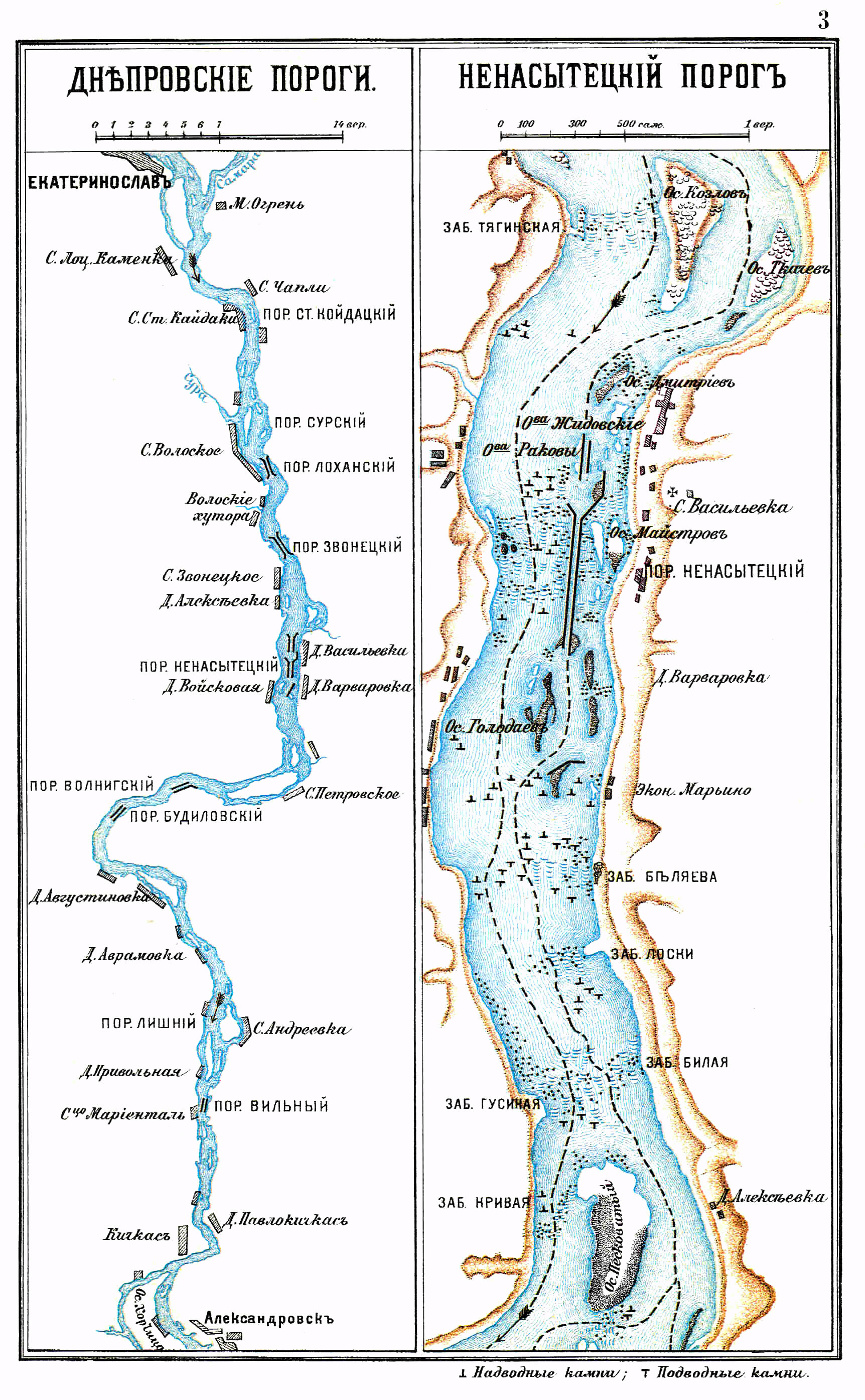
(left): An 1890 illustration of the Dnieper rapids; (right): the navigation route near one of the rapids.

Ever since the Dnieper first became used to connect the Kievan Rus’ lands with Scandinavia and the Byzantine Empire, it has been an important trade route. The main obstacles to navigation were the Dnieper rapids, first described during the 10th century. At the rapids (between modern-day Dnipro and Zaporizhzhia), the Dnieper was strewn with cliffs, rocks, and boulders that blocked off part of the river (zabory), or that cut right across it (porohy). The rapids made continuous navigation almost impossible; Kyivan Rus’ merchants, forced to circumvent them by land, were often ambushed by bandits at the rapids.

The government attempted to overcome how the rapids effectively divided the navigable river into two separated parts. During the 1840s, canals were constructed, but these were inadequate for ships, and even smaller craft continued to take the original ‘Cossack’ route through gaps in the rapids and barriers—and then only when the water level was high. After the Russian railway system was extended to the Crimean peninsula, the Dnieper trade route near the rapids now became safe from attack, and was able to play a greater role in reviving the region's economy.

The rapids ceased to exist when the Dnieper Reservoir was built in 1932, and the river's water level was raised by 40 metres (130 ft).

=== Flooding prior to the regulation of the flow of the Dnieper ===
The worst flood during the 19th century in that affected the local population was in 1845; flood levels in Kremenchuk reached 6.86 metres (22.5 ft). The 1931 flood caused catastrophic damage, when all the population centres on the eastern, more gentle-sloping, shore of the river from Kyiv to Zaporizhzhia were flooded. Such an event is thought to occur once every 300 years. That winter's snowfall melted quickly in the spring, so that the snowmelt happened quickly, and the water level in the Dnieper rose rapidly as a result.

In 1970, the Kyiv Dam partially prevented a repetition of the flooding that devastated Kyiv in 1931.

=== Construction of the Dnieper dams and power station ===
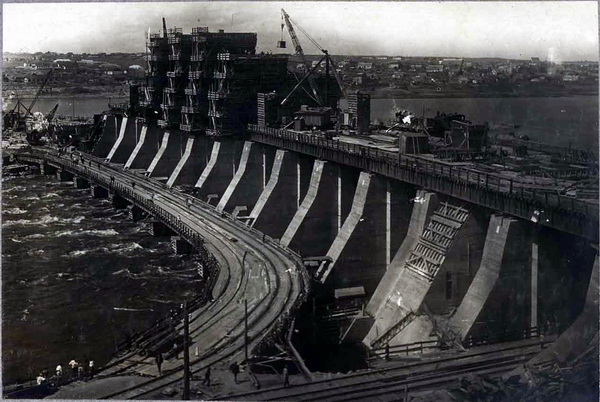
Construction of the Dnieper Hydroelectric Station dam

Plans for a HPP on the Dnieper were first made in 1905, but were not realized due to World War I. Following the plan of the State Commission for the Electrification of Russia (GOELRO), the first HPP on the Dnieper was built at Zaporizhzhia.

The problem of navigating through the Dnieper rapids remained unsolved until the Russian engineer Ivan Alexandrov supervised the construction of the HPP. The dam was made in the shape of a horseshoe, with a base made of concrete rather than rubble. A lack of heavy equipment meant that the construction of the dam was mostly done manually. Prior to completion, the number of on-site workers exceeded 60,000, most of whom were villagers from southern Ukraine. When it commenced operations, HPP provided energy for all of southern Ukraine, and proved to be vital for the manufacturing of heavy weapons and the production of aluminium and steel for aircraft and tanks.

=== Second World War ===
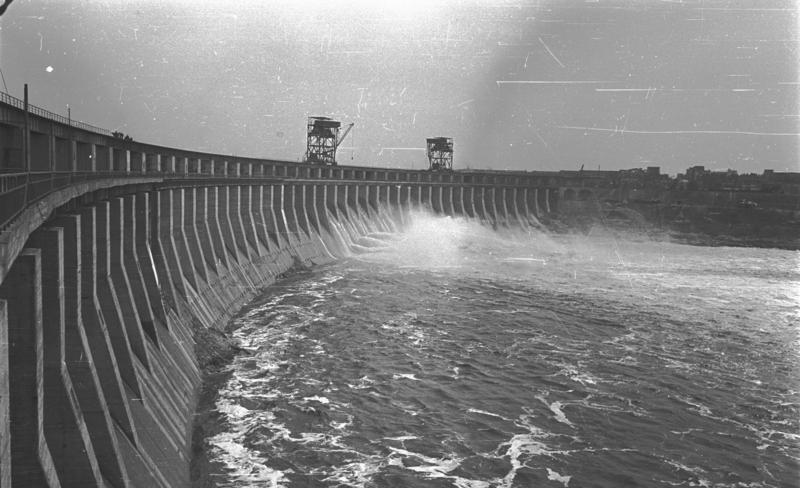
The Dnieper Reservoir Dam in 1942, shown after it was repaired by the Wehrmacht following its destruction by NKVD saboteurs in August 1941

In August 1941, NKVD agents acting under orders from the Soviet leadership blew up the Dnieper Reservoir dam, supposedly in an attempt to hinder the German advance that was believed at the time to be approaching Zaporizhzhia. (Note: Alternatively, the Dnieper HPP could have been destroyed by the Soviets so that it would not fall into German hands. Twenty tons of explosives were flown in from Moscow and placed inside the dam two days before the demolition, which was personally approved by Stalin.) The resulting explosion created a tidal surge that reached a height of 10 metres (33 ft), destroying everything in its path, killing thousands of civilians in settlements along the Dnieper, and devastating homes, villages, and towns. Hundreds of retreating Red Army troops drowned, as no warning had been given to them of the plan to sabotage the dam. Following the attack, the Soviets falsely blamed the destruction on the advancing Germans. No records of the death toll were ever made, so that the total number of people killed by the disaster remains unknown.

The Germans repaired the dam after they captured it later that year. In March 1943, it was blown up again using more than 200 tons of explosives and aerial bombs, this time by German troops as they retreated from the Red Army. The Soviets prevented the retreating Germans from completely destroying the dam, by cutting some of the wires to the explosives.

Among the reconstruction projects undertaken in Ukraine in the decade following the end of the war, the one given high priority by the newly-appointed party boss of the Zaporizhzhia Oblast, Leonid Brezhnev, was the rebuilding of both the HPP and the destroyed Zaporizhzhia steelworks. They became operational again by September 1947, but the ruined city of Zaporizhzhia and its surrounding villages were left devastated long afterwards, a crime which led to famine and thousands of deaths.

=== Completion of the reservoir cascade ===
It was discovered soon after construction of the Dnieper HPP that when the reservoir levels were low in the autumn and the winter (due to the irregular flow of the river), the power output noticeably decreased, and ships were unable to pass through the locks. In 1936, Gosplan concluded in a report that considered solutions to these problems that:

...an important part of the problem of the Great Dnieper is the energy use of the Lower Dnieper, since about 85% of the energy potential of the Dnieper is concentrated here.

During 1938–1941, the scheme for the building of the new Kremenchuk and Dniprodzerzhyn Reservoirs on the Lower Dnieper was developed, with the aim of regulating the flow of the river at the Dnieper HPP.

in the 1950s and 1960s three new HPPs were built. Their construction caused the flow of the Dnieper to be diverted, huge areas of farmland to be destroyed, and mines to be flooded. The decision to build the Kakhovka HPP was made in September 1950. The project, seen as part of Stalin’s “Great Plan for the Transformation of Nature”, was estimated to cost 2.5 billion rubles and planned to be finished in 6 years. Its construction required new towns, railways, roads highways, power lines, locks, and a port. It was emphasized by the authorities that:

“The resolution of the Council of Ministers of the USSR on the construction of the Dnieper hydroelectric power station, adopted on the initiative of Comrade Stalin, solves the most important national economic task of transforming the vast land masses of the arid regions of southern Ukraine into a fertile land of cotton, wheat, highly productive meat and dairy farming, fine-wool sheep farming and poultry farming.”

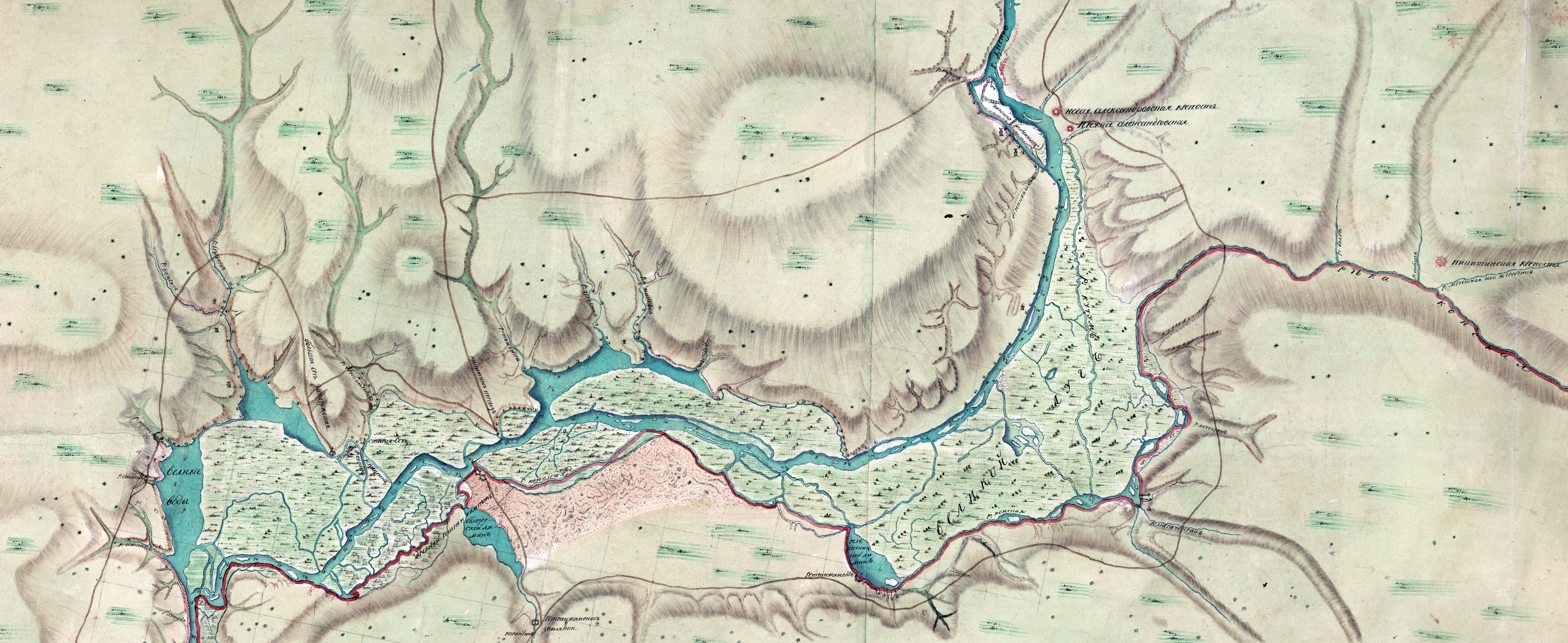
The Great Meadow, as shown on a 1775 map

The design and construction was entrusted to the Ukrainian SSR, under the supervision of Dniprobud, a construction organisation set up in the 1920s by the Soviets. Work on the Kakhovka project was severely hindered from the start. A 154-kilometre-long (96 mi) access railway that was begun in 1951 only opened in May 1952. Further delays were caused by a lack of clear planning, insufficient levels of electrical power, problems encountered with the acquisition and maintenance of equipment, a poorly-organised workforce, and an acute lack of housing and poor living conditions for the workers and their families. The Ukrainian SSR prioritised the need to protect industrial facilities from flooding and submersion. They ignored other environmental concerns such as the loss of the environmentally and historically important Great Meadow (Velykyi luh), a 100-kilometre-long (62 mi) system of rivers, reed beds, swamps, flooded forests, and meadow lands. The completed reservoir submerged 72 villages and towns—funds to relocate people, historic buildings or transport services were not provided. In addition, the rapid construction period and poor quality of work created the potential for future problems concerning the reservoir’s defences.

The construction of the reservoir at Kaniv—the last to be built—led to a change in the outlines of the area’s floodplain islands. The town’s water level area rose by 1 metre (3 ft 3 in), and part of Maly Island, the sandy shoal of Trukhanov Island, and the shoal near the Paton Bridge disappeared under water. Two other islands lost their land bridge. In 1980, Kaniv's power was increased from 585 to 1,513.1 megawatts (784,500 to 2,029,100 hp), enabling it to generate 9,255 gigawatt hours of energy per year. The first stage of the modernisation of the HPP at Kaniv was completed in 2002.

=== Post-independence ===
After Ukraine became independent in 1991, the demand by industry for electrical power diminished. Pollution levels in the cascade worsened in the 1990s and there has been little improvement to the system since, in part as a result of mismanagement of the issue by the Ukrainian government.

Greenpeace and other advocacy groups have criticized the Ukrainian government for not reducing pollution levels.

== Russo-Ukrainian War ==
One 24 February 2022, the first day of the Russian invasion of Ukraine, Russian troops temporarily managed to seize the Kyiv Reservoir dam. A Russian missile was shot down later in the week before it could strike the dam. After Russian armed forces took control of the Kakhovka Dam at the start of the Russo-Ukrainian war, Ukrainian troops fortified the five other dams of the Dnieper cascade to prevent them from falling into enemy hands. At the end of February 2022 extensive flooding was caused north of Kyiv by the blasting of a saddle dam adjoining the Kyiv Reservoir that protected the valley of the Irpin River.

From March 2024, HPPs on the cascade effectively stopped working. During three years of war, after the Russians had shelled the Dnieper HPP about 50 times, the construction of a protective structure was begun. The destruction of the Kakhovka Dam in June 2023 disrupted the operation of all the HPPs on the Dnieper—the water level lowered and schedules and turbine repairs were halted. The stations were forced to stop discharging water through the turbines, needed so as to generate electricity. Only necessary repairs and increased protection measures have been undertaken, in order to contend with cruise missiles and explosive-carrying drones.

=== Breaching of the Kakhovka Dam on 6 June 2023 ===
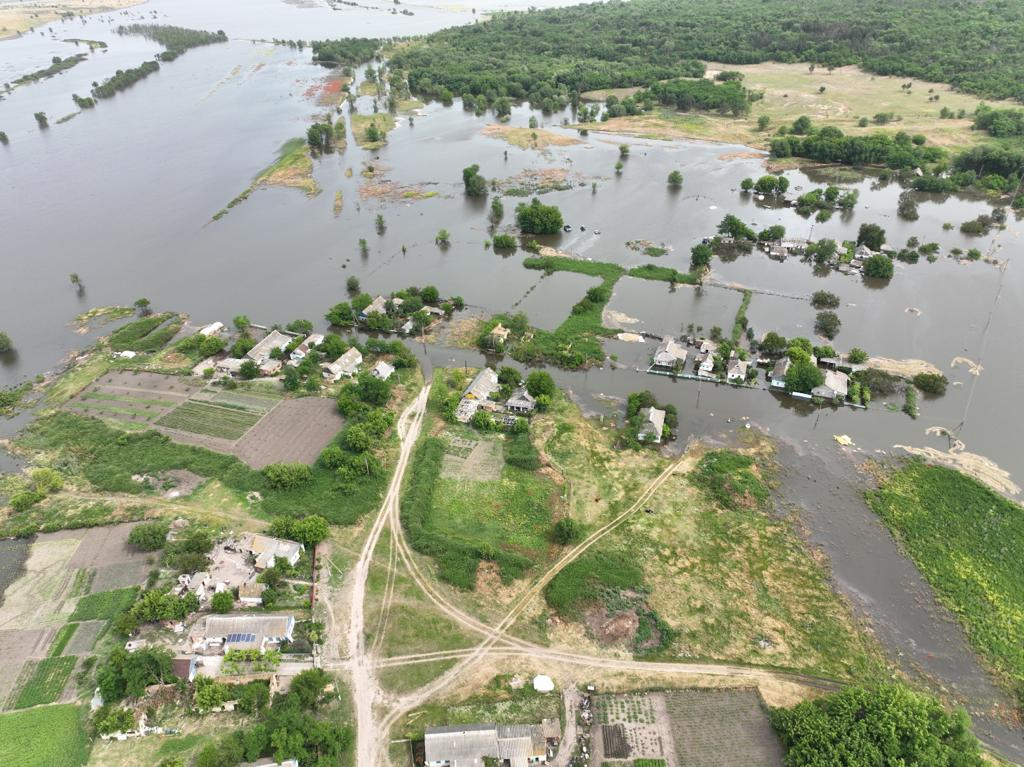
Flooding in Kherson Oblast (as seen on 10 June 2023), caused by the destruction of the Kakhovka Dam

Russia, which has launched widespread strikes on Ukraine's energy infrastructure since the start of the Russo-Ukrainian war, has been accused by the Ukrainians of targeting the dams in the Dnieper reservoir cascade.

On 6 June 2023, the Kakhovka Dam was breached and water surged through it. The ensuing floods across the war zone triggered emergency evacuations and the possibility that "ecological disaster" would ensue, according to NBC News. At least one town near the dam was completely flooded, and Ukraine's state emergency service reported that about 1,300 people were evacuated during the day. Ukrainian officials accused the Russian government of staging a "terrorist attack", while Russian officials denied any involvement. Whilst the Ukrainian president Volodymyr Zelenskyy stated that the attack amounted to "the largest man-made environmental disaster in Europe in decades”, Vladimir Putin’s spokesman Dmitry Peskov denied any of Russian involvement. The BBC used satellite imagery to look at the canals fed from the Kakhovka Dam. Four canals have been identified as drying up. This could affect the drinking water of some 700,000 people.

The loss of the HPP led to a dramatic increase in the seahorse population along the Black Sea coast at Odesa, and the return of marbled crabs that had been largely missing for almost 20 years. Hydrobiologists have attributed the population increases to the seabed becoming cleaner, as well as the almost complete lack of shipping and tourists in the area since the start of the Russian invasion in 2022.

==== Archaeological finds ====
The explosion is estimated to have damaged 148 archaeological sites on the western bank of the Dnieper, none of which had been the subject of serious archaeological research prior to the creation of the reservoir. The lands had once been the home to the Zaporizhian Cossacks, and most of their sich were located on the Great Meadow.

The disappearance of the reservoir has provided opportunities for archaeological research. Soon after it had drained away, finds such as muskets were found near Nikopol. The remains of the church at Pokrovsky—painted by the Ukraininan artist Taras Shevchenko and described by the Soviet screen writer Alexander Dovzhenko—was discovered. Greek amphorae, Byzantine objects, arrowheads, and human remains have been found, and a centuries-old oak boat was discovered in the river at Zaporizhia.

== Environmental and structural concerns ==
=== General ===
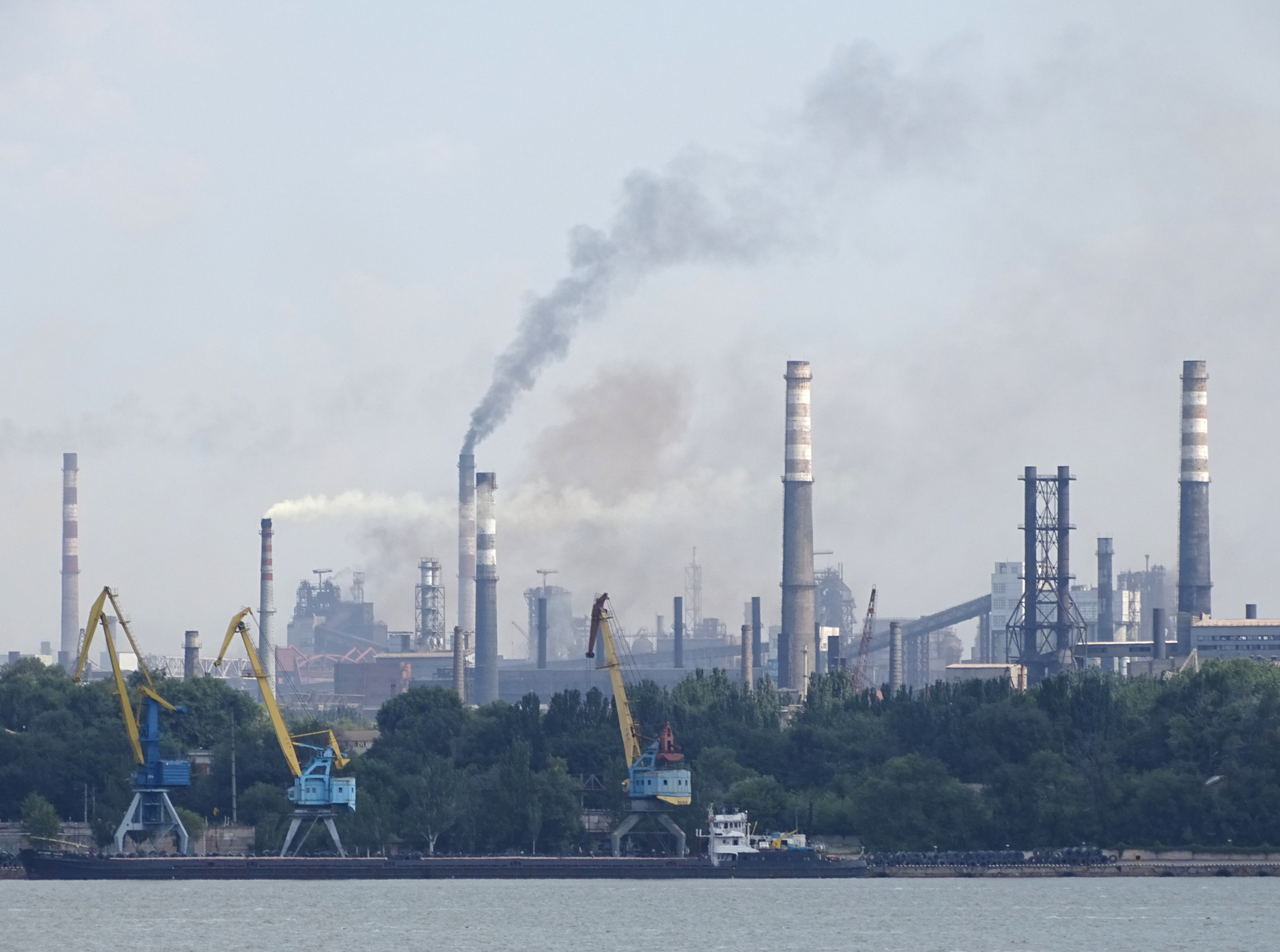
View across the Dnieper of Zaporizhzhia's industrial district

In geoecological terms (geoecology is the interdisciplinary study of geography and ecology), the condition of the reservoirs has been described by Iryna Ostapchuk of Kryvyi Rih State Pedagogical University as 'unsatisfactory' in terms of both natural causes (ecological processes that occurred once the reservoirs were created) and manmade causes (pollution caused by economic development around the banks, the effects of HPPs, eutrophication, the increased risk of flooding, erosion, abrasion of the banks, silt accumulation, and the increase of karst processes. Radioactive contamination, and chemical waste from towns and cities, industry, and agriculture have led to increased pollution levels. Increased irrigation and evaporation from reservoirs have reduced the rate of discharge of water into the Black Sea by 20%, and caused serious damage to wetland areas.

Much of Ukraine’s farmland is treated with chemicals that enter the Dnieper watershed. Nitrogen and phosphorus lead to eutrophication, which is worsened by sewage dumping into the Dnieper basin.

=== Radioactivity ===
The Dnieper reservoirs contain an additional threat—after the Chernobyl Nuclear Disaster in 1986, radionuclides washed away by rains contaminated the bottom silt of the Dnieper and its associated reservoirs. The disaster spread enormous quantities of radioactivity that still contaminates the river, though at a declining rate. Cesium-137 and strontium-90 have settled at the bottom of the Kyiv Reservoir; the radioactivity is safe unless the sediment is disturbed. If the dam were to fail, Kyiv would become contaminated with radioactivity by the floodwaters. If a chain reaction was to occur, the whole cascade would become contaminated as each dam was destroyed in turn.

The uranium mining and processing industry, which produces a fine solid residue containing the radioactive elements thorium-230 and radium-226, is concentrated on the Dnieper at Kamianske, a city that also pollutes the river with iron production waste, coke, and other chemicals.

=== Threats to the dams ===
Concerns that the dams along the Dnieper might fail have been raised, in particular after the 2009 Sayano–Shushenskaya power station accident, the Russian attack of the Kakhovka Dam on 11 July 2022. Flooding would have a serious impact on communities such as Kherson and others south of Nova Kakhovka. To combat uncontrolled flooding, the National Academy of Sciences of Ukraine developed a method for forecasting floods. As of 2012 the Government of Ukraine has refused to adopt it.

New concerns arose in 2005 after a fake terrorist threat case. A police officer, dissatisfied with his commanders, anonymously called an emergency line stating that he had planted a bomb in a cargo train crossing the Kyiv Reservoir's dam. An immediate check proved the threat to be fake and the officer was arrested. Regardless, the incident caused another wave of public concern.

=== Impact on fish stocks in the reservoirs ===
Commercial exploitation by the fishing industry began soon after each reservoir was completed. Many species inhabiting the flooded zone were adversely affected, and measures to re-establish fish populations using juveniles were not implemented. As a result, some species became close to dying out; sturgeon disappeared completely after being unable to return up the river because of the newly-built dams. As an example, the Kyiv Reservoir is characterized by good flow, an open head and the preservation of many areas where the habitat resembles the way it was before the construction of the dam. Almost all the fish species survived, but the proportions of their populations have changed. In 2010, during an abnormally cold winter, a 1 metre (3 ft 3 in) thick layer of ice sank, killing hundreds of tons of fish. In 2016, Kaniv reservoir was selected to be re-stocked with over 100,000 juvenile fish, which followed the release of 2,360,000 juveniles in 2013.

In 2016, as a response the sharp decline in fish populations caused by illegal fishing, the Kyiv Oblast Council's Commission on Ecology and Water Resources banned commercial fishing in the Kaniv and Kyiv reservoirs until 2018.

== See also ==
- Hydroelectricity in Ukraine
- Renewable energy in Ukraine

== Sources ==
- Bazhan, Oleg G. (2024). Savchenko, V. A. (ed.). "Каховська ГЕС: за лаштунками "Великої будови комунізму"" [Kakhovka HPP: behind the scenes of the "Great Building of Communism"]. Odesa: historical and local history scientific almanac (in Ukrainian) (36). Odesa, Ukraine: Bondarenko M. O. (National Union of Local History of Ukraine, Association of European Culture "Golden Acacia"): 137–148.
- Bazhan, Oleg G. (2025). "Як будувалася Каховська ГЕС: локація, проєктування, вартість" [How the Kakhovka HPP was built: location, design, cost]. Local History (in Ukrainian) (1): 203. doi:10.15407/kraieznavstvo2025.01.203.
- Cybriwsky, Roman Adrian (2018). "The River's Health". In Along Ukraine’s River: A Social and Environmental History of the Dnipro (Dnieper). Budapest, Hungary: CEU Press. pp. 91–102 – via JSTOR.
- Degodyuk, E.G.; Degodyuk, S.E. (2006). "Characteristics of water reservoirs of the Dnieper cascade". Ecological and Technogenic Safety of Ukraine. Kyiv, Ukraine: EKMO.
- Kozhukh, Alexander Yurievich; Sokolenko, Valery Mikhailovich; Kireeva, Irina Yurievna (2018). "Состояние Запасов Промысловых Гидробионтов Киевского И Каневского Водохранилищ" [The State of Commercial Marine Stocks in the Kyiv and Kanev Reservoirs]. Bulletin of the Astrakhan State Technical University (in Russian). Fisheries (4): 46–52. doi:10.24143/2073-5529-2018-4-46-52. ISSN 2073-5529.
- Obodovskyi, Oleksandr; Mechkin, Karl (2018). "The Dnieper Cascade as part of International Waterway E40". Geography and Tourism. 6 (1). Kazimierz Wielki University Press: 69–75. doi:10.5281/zenodo.1314030. ISSN 2353-4524.
- Plokhy, Serhii (2017). The Gates of Europe: A History of Ukraine. London: Penguin Books. ISBN 978-0-465-09346-5.
- Treffers, Fulco; Korchagin, Antoine; Usychenko, Svitlana; Mnatsakanian, Vaagn; van Epp, Tim; Buckley, Niall; Panchev, Hristo; Bondov, Angel (2024). Dnipro River Integrated Vision (PDF). Greenpeace.
- Tyurin, P. V. (1972). "«Нормальные» кривые переживания и темпов естественной смертности рыб как теоретическая основа регулирования рыболовства" [“Normal” curves of survival and rates of natural mortality of fish as a theoretical basis for regulating fisheries]. Izvestiya GosNIORKh (in Ukrainian) (71): 71–128.
- Wilson, A. (2006). Ukraine's Orange Revolution. Yale University Press. ISBN 978-0-300-14391-1.
- Yablokov, Alexey V.; Nesterenko, Vassily B.; Nesterenko, Alexey V. (2009). "8. Atmospheric, Water, and Soil Contamination after Chernobyl". Annals of the New York Academy of Sciences. 1181 (1): 223–236. Bibcode:2009NYASA1181..223Y. doi:10.1111/j.1749-6632.2009.04831.x. ISSN 0077-8923. PMID 20002050.
