= List of reservoirs by surface area =

Below are the reservoirs (artificial lakes) in the world with a surface area exceeding 500 km^{2} (190 mi^{2}). Reservoirs can be formed conventionally, by damming the outlet of a canyon or valley to form a lake; the largest of this type is Ghana's Lake Volta, with a water surface of 8,500 km^{2} (3,300 mi^{2}). Reservoirs can also be formed by damming the outlets of natural lakes to regulate water levels, such as ones at Uganda's Owen Falls Dam (Lake Victoria) and Russia's Irkutsk Dam (Lake Baikal); they are included here and indicated with a light blue cell background.

Large reservoir area does not necessarily coincide with large volume, as reservoirs with a large area tend to be shallow, such as at Suriname's 1,560 km^{2} (600 mi^{2}) Brokopondo Reservoir, with an average depth of just 13 m (43 ft). In comparison, Canada's Kinbasket Lake, with an average depth of 58 m (190 ft), has a volume 25 percent greater – but with a surface area of just 430 km^{2} (170 mi^{2}), does not meet the cutoff for inclusion in this list.

== List ==
Natural lake with artifically regulated water levels

Name	Country	Dam	Outflow	Surface area		Ref	Image
				km^{2}	mi^{2}		
Lake Victoria (Note: Owen Falls Dam raised the level of Lake Victoria)	Kenya; Tanzania; Uganda	Owen Falls Dam	White Nile	66,400	25,600		
Irkutsk Reservoir– Lake Baikal (Note: Irkutsk Dam and Reservoir raised the level of Lake Baikal)	Russia	Irkutsk Dam	Angara River	32,000	12,000		
Lake Winnipeg (Note: Jenpeg Dam and a series of dikes and diversion channels are operated by Manitoba Hydro to maintain Lake Winnipeg as a storage reservoir for hydroelectricity generation.)	Canada	Jenpeg Dam	Nelson River	24,420	9,430		
Lake Volta	Ghana	Akosombo Dam	Volta River	8,500	3,300		
Smallwood Reservoir	Canada	Multiple	Churchill River	6,527	2,520		
Reindeer Lake (Note: Reindeer Lake raised slightly and outflow regulated by Whitesand Dam)	Canada	Whitesand Dam	Reindeer River	6,500	2,500		
Kuybyshev Reservoir	Russia	Zhiguli Dam	Volga River	6,450	2,490		
Lake Kariba	Zambia; Zimbabwe	Kariba Dam	Zambezi River	5,580	2,150		
Bukhtarma Reservoir (Note: Bukhtarma Dam raised the level of Lake Zaysan)	Kazakhstan	Bukhtarma Dam	Irtysh River	5,490	2,120		
Bratsk Reservoir	Russia	Bratsk Dam	Angara River	5,470	2,110		
Lake Nasser	Egypt	Aswan Dam	Nile	5,200	2,000		
Rybinsk Reservoir	Russia	Rybinsk Dam	Volga River	4,550	1,760		
Caniapiscau Reservoir	Canada	Multiple	Caniapiscau River	4,318	1,667		
Lake Guri	Venezuela	Guri Dam	Caroni River	4,250	1,640		
Sobradinho Reservoir	Brazil	Sobradinho Dam	São Francisco River	4,225	1,631		
Volgograd Reservoir	Russia	Volga Dam	Volga River	3,117	1,203		
Lago Tucuruí	Brazil	Tucuruí Dam	Tocantins River	2,875	1,110		
Robert-Bourassa Reservoir	Canada	Robert-Bourassa Dam	La Grande River	2,815	1,087		
Tsimlyansk Reservoir	Russia	Tsimlyansky Dam	Don River	2,702	1,043		
Cahora Bassa Lake	Mozambique	Cahora Bassa Dam	Zambezi River	2,665	1,029		
La Grande-3 Reservoir	Canada	La Grande-3 Dam	La Grande River	2,536	979		
Vilyuy Reservoir	Russia	Vilyuy Dam	Vilyuy River	2,501	966		
Kaptai lake	Bangladesh	Kaptai Dam	Karnaphuli River	2,399	926		
Balbina Reservoir	Brazil	Balbina Dam	Uatumã River	2,360	910		
Sanmenxia Reservoir	China	Sanmenxia Dam	Yellow River	2,350	910		
Boguchany Reservoir	Russia	Boguchany Dam	Angara River	2,326	898		
Sérgio Motta Reservoir	Brazil	Eng Sérgio Motta Dam	Paraná River	2,250	870		
Ust-Khantai Reservoir	Russia	Ust-Khantai Dam	Khantayka River	2,230	860		
Cheboksary Reservoir	Russia	Cheboksary Dam	Volga River	2,190	850		
Kremenchuk Reservoir	Ukraine	Kremenchuk Dam	Dnieper River	2,250	870		
Lake Argyle	Australia	Ord River Dam	Ord River	2,072	800		
Krasnoyarsk Reservoir	Russia	Krasnoyarsk Dam	Yenisei River	2,000	770		
Manicouagan Reservoir	Canada	Daniel-Johnson Dam	Manicouagan River	1,973	762		
Ust-Ilimsk Reservoir	Russia	Ust-Ilimsk Dam	Angara River	1,922	742		
Kama Reservoir	Russia	Kama Dam	Kama River	1,915	739		
Kapchagay Reservoir	Kazakhstan	Kapchagay Dam	Ili River	1,847	713		
Saratov Reservoir	Russia	Balakovo Dam	Volga River	1,831	707		
Williston Lake	Canada	W.A.C. Bennett Dam	Peace River	1,773	685		
Yacyretá Reservoir	Argentina; Paraguay	Yacyretá Dam	Paraná River	1,600	620		
Lake Sakakawea	United States	Garrison Dam	Missouri River	1,539	594		
Lake Oahe	United States	Oahe Dam	Missouri River	1,515	585		
Brokopondo Reservoir	Suriname	Afobaka Dam	Suriname River	1,500	580		
Furnas Reservoir	Brazil	Furnas Dam	Grande River	1,473	569		
Itaipu Reservoir	Brazil; Paraguay	Itaipu Dam	Paraná River	1,350	520		
Laforge-1 Reservoir	Canada	Laforge-1 Dam	Laforge River	1,288	497		
Rincón del Bonete Reservoir	Uruguay	Rincón del Bonete Dam	Río Negro River	1,240	480		
Nechako Reservoir	Canada	Kenney Dam	Nechako River	1,200	460		
Stiegler's Gorge Reservoir	Tanzania	Stiegler's Gorge Dam	Rufiji River	1,200	460		
Ilha Solteira Reservoir	Brazil	Ilha Solteira Dam	Paraná River	1,195	461		
Votkinsk Reservoir	Russia	Votkinsk Dam	Kama River	1,120	430		
Nizhnekamsk Reservoir	Russia	Nizhnekamsk Dam	Kama River	1,084	419		
Three Gorges Reservoir	China	Three Gorges Dam	Yangtze River	1,084	419		
Novosibirsk Reservoir	Russia	Novosibirsk Dam	Ob River	1,072	414		
Jebel Aulia Reservoir	Sudan	Jebel Aulia Dam	White Nile	1,051	406		
Danjiangkou Reservoir	China	Danjiangkou Dam	Han River	1,050	410		
Três Marias Reservoir	Brazil	Três Marias Dam	São Francisco River	1,040	400		
Pipmuacan Reservoir	Canada	Bersimis-1 Dam	Betsiamites River	978	378		
Fort Peck Lake	United States	Fort Peck Dam	Missouri River	976	377		
Kyiv Reservoir	Ukraine	Kyiv Dam	Dnieper River	922	356		
Shardara Reservoir	Kazakhstan	Shardara Dam	Syr Darya	900	350		
El Chocón Reservoir	Argentina	El Chocón Dam	Limay River	860	330		
Truman Reservoir	United States	Harry S. Truman Dam	Osage River	848	327		
Luiz Gonzaga Reservoir	Brazil	Luiz Gonzaga Dam	São Francisco River	828	320		
Lake Atatürk Dam	Turkey	Atatürk Dam	Euphrates River	817	315		
Srisailam Reservoir	India	Srisailam Dam	Krishna River	800	310		
Itumbiara Reservoir	Brazil	Itumbiara Dam	Paranaíba River	778	300		
La Grande-4 Reservoir	Canada	La Grande-4 Dam	La Grande River	765	295		
Toledo Bend Reservoir	United States	Toledo Bend Dam	Sabine River	736	284		
Hirakud Reservoir	India	Hirakud Dam	Mahanadi River	743	287		
Emborcação Reservoir	Brazil	Emborcação Dam	Paranaíba River	703	271		
Lake Powell	United States	Glen Canyon Dam	Colorado River	689	266		
Kaniv Reservoir	Ukraine	Kaniv Dam	Dnieper River	675	261		
Keban Reservoir	Turkey	Keban Dam	Euphrates	675	261		
São Simão Reservoir	Brazil	São Simão Dam	Paranaíba River	674	260		
Lake Mead	United States	Hoover Dam	Colorado River	659	254		
Água Vermelha Reservoir	Brazil	Água Vermelha Dam	Grande River	650	250		
Outardes-4 Reservoir	Canada	Outardes-4 Dam	Outardes River	625	241		
Lake Assad	Syria	Tabqa Dam	Euphrates	610	240		
Mingachevir Reservoir	Azerbaijan	Mingachevir Dam	Kura River	605	234		
Eastmain Reservoir	Canada	Multiple	Eastmain River	603	233		
Kamianske Reservoir	Ukraine	Kamianske Dam	Dnieper River	567	219		
Kayrakkum Reservoir	Tajikistan	Kayrakkum Dam	Syr Darya	523	202		
Capivara Reservoir	Brazil	Capivara Dam	Paranapanema River	515	199		

== See also ==
- List of reservoirs by volume
