= Dnieper Reservoir =

Reservoir on the Dnieper river in Ukraine

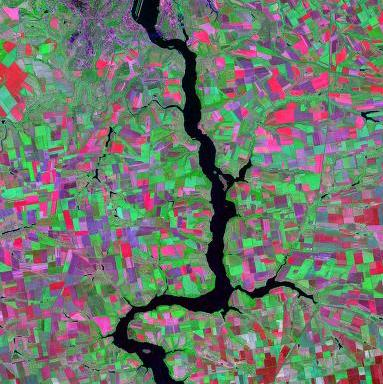

- Location within Ukraine
- Interactive map of Dnieper Reservoir
- Location: Zaporizhzhia (to the south), Dnipro (to the north), Dnipropetrovsk and Zaporizhzhia Oblasts
- Coordinates: 48°08′09″N 35°07′43″E
- Type: Hydroelectric reservoir
- Primary inflows: Dnieper River
- Primary outflows: Dnieper River
- Basin countries: Ukraine
- Max. length: 129 km (80 mi)
- Average depth: 8 m (26 ft)
- Max. depth: 53 m (174 ft)
- Water volume: 3.3 km^{3} (2,700,000 acre⋅ft)

The Dnieper Reservoir (Ukrainian: Дніпровське водосховище, romanized: Dniprovske vodoskhovyshche) is a reservoir on the Dnieper river in Ukrainian oblasts of Dnipropetrovsk and Zaporizhzhia. The reservoir's water level is maintained by the dam of the Dnieper Hydroelectric Station, built in Zaporizhzhia from 1927 to 1932. The filling of the reservoir inundated the Dnieper Rapids.

The Samara River flows from Samara Bay into the northern end of the reservoir near Dnipro. The reservoir stretches 129 kilometres (80 mi) from there to the dam in Zaporizhzhia, and has a width of 3.2 km, a maximum width of 7 km, an average depth of 8 meters, a maximum depth of 53 meters, and a volume of 3.3 km^{3}.

The Dnieper, Kakhovka, Kaniv, Kamianske, Kremenchuk, and Kyiv reservoirs form the Dnieper reservoir cascade, a deep-water route on the Dnieper that allows ships to sail upstream as far as the Prypiat river.
