= Kaniv Reservoir =

Reservoir on the Dnieper river in Ukraine

- Location within Cherkasy Oblast Location within Ukraine
- Interactive map of Kaniv Reservoir
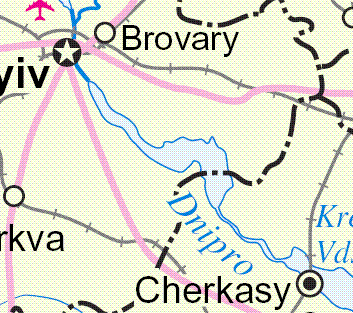
- Location: Kaniv (to the south), Cherkasy and Kyiv Oblasts, Ukraine
- Coordinates: 49°55′34″N 31°28′46″E
- Type: Hydroelectric reservoir
- Primary inflows: Dnieper River
- Primary outflows: Dnieper River
- Basin countries: Russia, Belarus, Ukraine
- Max. length: 162 km (101 mi)
- Max. width: 5 km (3.1 mi)
- Surface area: 675 km^{2} (261 sq mi)
- Average depth: 5.5 m (18 ft)
- Water volume: 2.6 km^{3} (2,100,000 acre⋅ft)
- Surface elevation: 87 m (285 ft)
- Settlements: Ukrainka, Rzhyschiv, Pereiaslav, Kaniv

The Kaniv Reservoir (Ukrainian: Канівське водосховище, romanized: Kanivs'ke vodoskhovyshche) is a reservoir located on the Dnieper river in the Ukrainian oblasts of Cherkasy and Kyiv. Named after the city of Kaniv, the reservoir has a length of 162 km, a maximum width of 5 km, an area of 675 km^{2}, an average depth of 5.5 meters, and a volume of 2.6 km^{3}. Its water level is maintained by a dam of the Kaniv Hydroelectric Power Plant, built in 1972.

The Kaniv, Kakhovka, Dnieper, Kamianske, Kremenchuk, and Kyiv reservoirs form the Dnieper reservoir cascade, a deep-water route on the Dnieper that allows ships to sail upstream as far as the Prypiat river.
