= Novoheorhiivsk =

Former city in Ukraine

Novoheorhiivsk Новогеоргіївськ
- City
- Location within Ukraine Kirovohrad Oblast Location within Ukraine
- Coordinates: 49°6′N 33°6′E
- Established: 1615
- Magdeburg rights: 1616
- Flooded: 1959–1961

Population
  - Estimate (1959): 9,343
- Time zone: UTC+2
  - Summer (DST): UTC+3

Novoheorhiivsk (Ukrainian: Новогеоргіївськ; Russian: Новогеоргиевск, romanized: Novogeorgiyevsk) was a city in Ukraine that since 1961 has been flooded by the Kremenchuk Reservoir.

== History ==
The city was established during the Polish colonization of new territories that the Crown of Poland received after the Union of Lublin in 1615 as Krylow (Polish: Kryłów; Ukrainian: Крилів, romanized: Kryliv), part of the Korsun Starosta. The settlement was established on the right bank of Dnieper near Tiasmyn River. Some historical facts state that the residents of the city in 1616 accounted for 200 courts and implying of population of some 1200 people. At that time the settlement received the Magdeburg rights. It also received a status of sloboda which excused the city of a land tax for the next 30 years. The by court registration of the city in 1631 accounted for 50 settled houses and 200 estates. During the Cossack uprisings in the mid 17th century the city suffered from the numerous attacks.

Since the partition of Poland, the city was transferred to the Russian Empire. In 1795 became the city of Aleksandria, Russian Empire. Several years prior to that in the city was based the Myrhorod Regiment and in 1741 the city accounted for 400 courts with 2000 population. In 1752-1764 was one of the two major cities of the New Serbia and housed one company of the Pandury Regiment. In 1808 the city accounted only for some 45 courts with 550 residents.

In 1860 the city was renamed Novoheorhiivsk. It was part of the Aleksandriya Uyezd of Kherson Governorate. In 1894 the city accounted for 1634 courts (12653 residents) and 350 desiatinas of land. There were three Russian Orthodox churches, a synagogue, a church school, two middle schools, a hospital, eleven factories and other. During the World War I the city housed the Crimean Cavalry Regiment and the Eighth Reserve Cavalry Regiment of the Russian Army. The city was one of the battlegrounds during the war and was protected by a citadel and an unfinished belt of forts. Evacuation of its inhabitants, however, came too late because the trains were deployed to evacuate Warsaw. An account cited that 85,000 prisoners were taken at Novogeorgievsk by the Germans.

In 1959–1961 after the construction of the Kremenchuk HES the population of the city was evacuated to Svitlovodsk as its territory has been flooded. The city was part of the territory, which included 9,900 homesteads, that was destroyed because of the reservoir. Some parts of the city that stayed on the higher lands were preserved and transformed into the village of Nahirne (today in Oleksandriia Raion).

== Notable residents ==
- The Russian opera singer Mikhail Shuisky was born in Novoheorhiivsk in 1883.

== Sources ==
- Encyclopedia of F.A. Brokehous and I.A. Efron(in Russian);
- Lavrentiy Pokhilevich. "Tales of the Kiev Governorate settlements". Kyiv, 1864(in Russian)
