= Kyiv Reservoir =

Reservoir in Ukraine

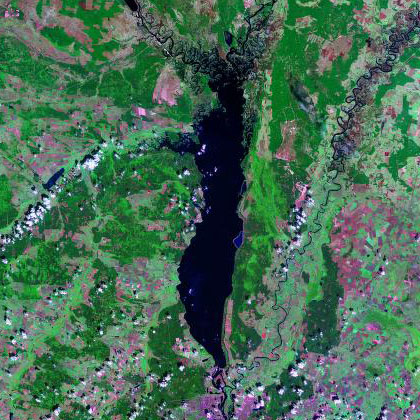

- Location within Kyiv Oblast Location within Ukraine
- Interactive map of Kyiv Reservoir
- Location: North of Kyiv, Kyiv Oblast, Ukraine
- Coordinates: 50°49′12″N 30°27′49″E
- Type: Hydroelectric reservoir
- Primary inflows: Dnipro River
- Primary outflows: Dnipro River
- Basin countries: Russia, Belarus, Ukraine
- Max. length: 110 km (68 mi)
- Max. width: 12 km (7.5 mi)
- Surface area: 922 km^{2} (356 sq mi)
- Max. depth: 8 m (26 ft)
- Water volume: 3.7 km^{3} (0.89 cu mi)
- Surface elevation: 99 m (325 ft)

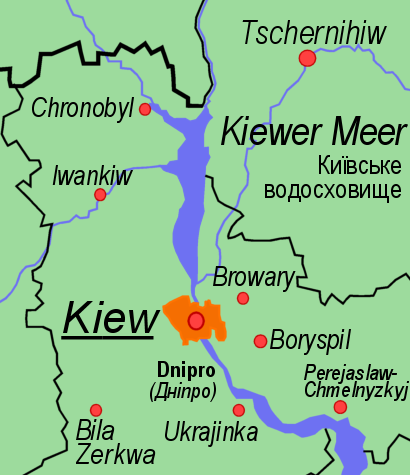
Map of the Kyiv Reservoir

The Kyiv Reservoir (Ukrainian: Київське водосховище, romanized: Kyivs'ke vodoskhovyshche), locally the Kyiv Sea (Ukrainian: Київське море, romanized: Kyivs'ke more), is a large water reservoir located on the Dnipro River in Ukraine. Named after the city of Kyiv, which lies to the south, it covers an area of 922 square kilometres (356 sq mi) within the Kyiv Oblast. The reservoir filled in 1964–1966 after the dam for the Kyiv Hydroelectric Power Plant was built at Vyshhorod. The reservoir is mainly used for hydroelectricity generation, industrial and public consumption, and irrigation.

The reservoir is 110 km in length, 12 km in width, has a depth of four to eight meters, a volume of 3.7 km^{3} (0.89 cu mi), and a usable volume of 1.2 km^{3} (0.29 cu mi). The reservoir, together with the Kakhovka Reservoir (destroyed in 2023 during Russian invasion of Ukraine), the Dnieper Reservoir, the Kamianske Reservoir, the Kremenchuk Reservoir, and the Kaniv Reservoir, has created a deep-water route on the river. However, its creation has also contributed to significant environmental problems such as the diminished flow velocity which reduces water oxygenation, and has a negative result on the balance of aquatic life forms. Also, some nearby villages were flooded when it filled. One of these was Teremtsi, where the residents of the village persuaded Soviet authorities to let them stay, only to be evacuated later in 1986 during the Chernobyl disaster.

== Safety issues ==
Like all Dnieper reservoirs, Kyiv Reservoir poses potential threat of tremendous flooding if its dam is destroyed. Moreover, it contains additional major threat – after the Chernobyl nuclear disaster in 1986, radionuclides washed away by rains badly contaminated the bottom silt of the reservoir. During the years following the disaster, there were suggestions to drain the reservoir because it was too shallow. It appeared that, if done, this might have created the threat of radioactive dust travelling by wind, possibly affecting Europe.

A similar threat was permanently discussed regarding the potential destruction of the dam (by natural accident, terrorism or war). But the authorities continued to dismiss such dangers as unreal, claiming to be in full control of the dam's safety. However, serious concerns were raised in 2005, when a fake terrorist alert was made.

Worries about possible destruction arose again in February 2022 during the Kyiv offensive. Russian forces took control of the power plant on 25 or 26 February. Ukrainian forces recaptured it on 26 February. It was claimed that Ukrainian air defenses intercepted a missile flying towards the dam. Interfax stated that if the dam were to fail, flooding could destroy "the entire left bank of Kyiv".

== Gallery ==
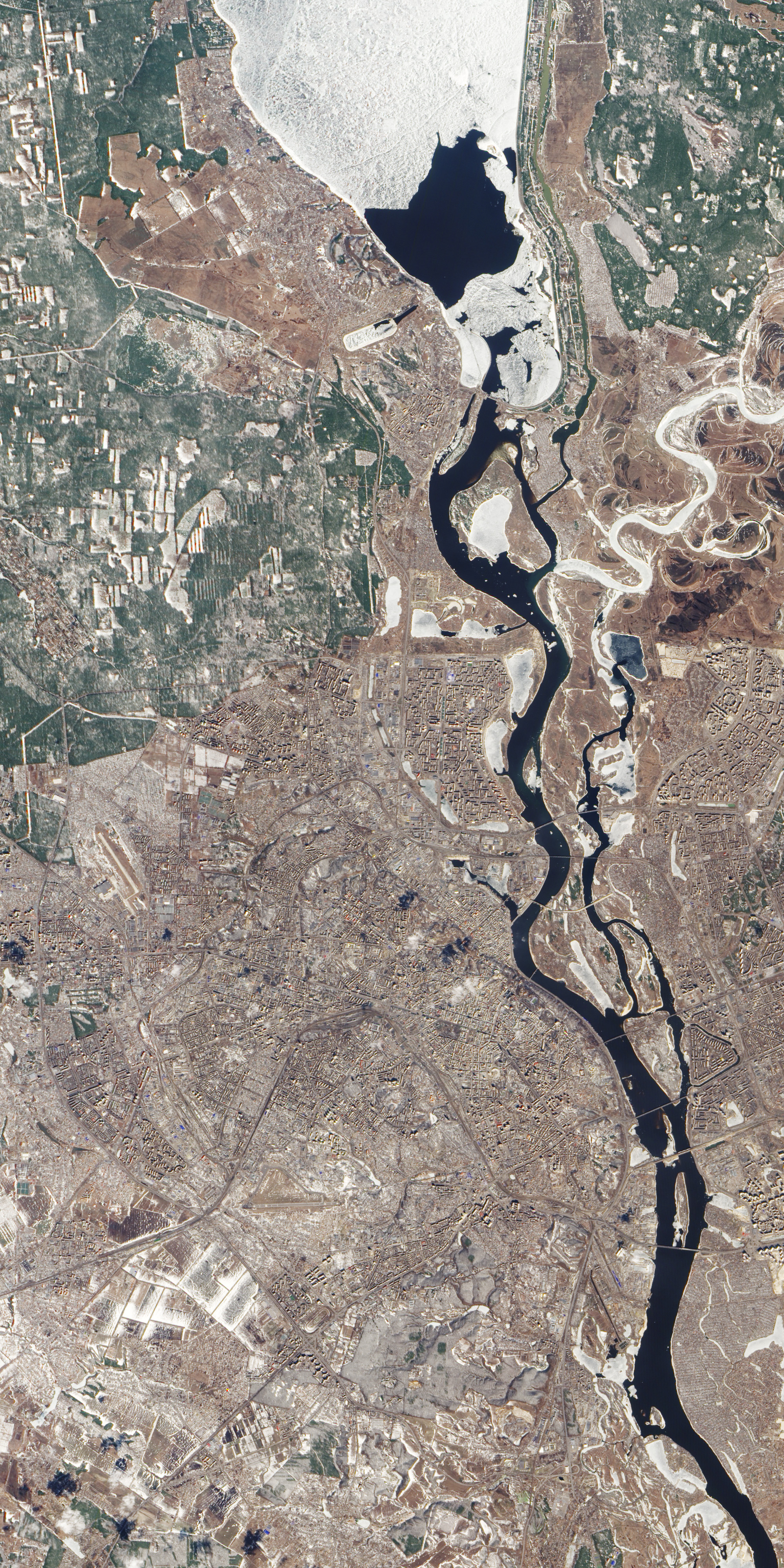
The reservoir's surface is a combination of ice-covered and ice-free areas in this springtime image.

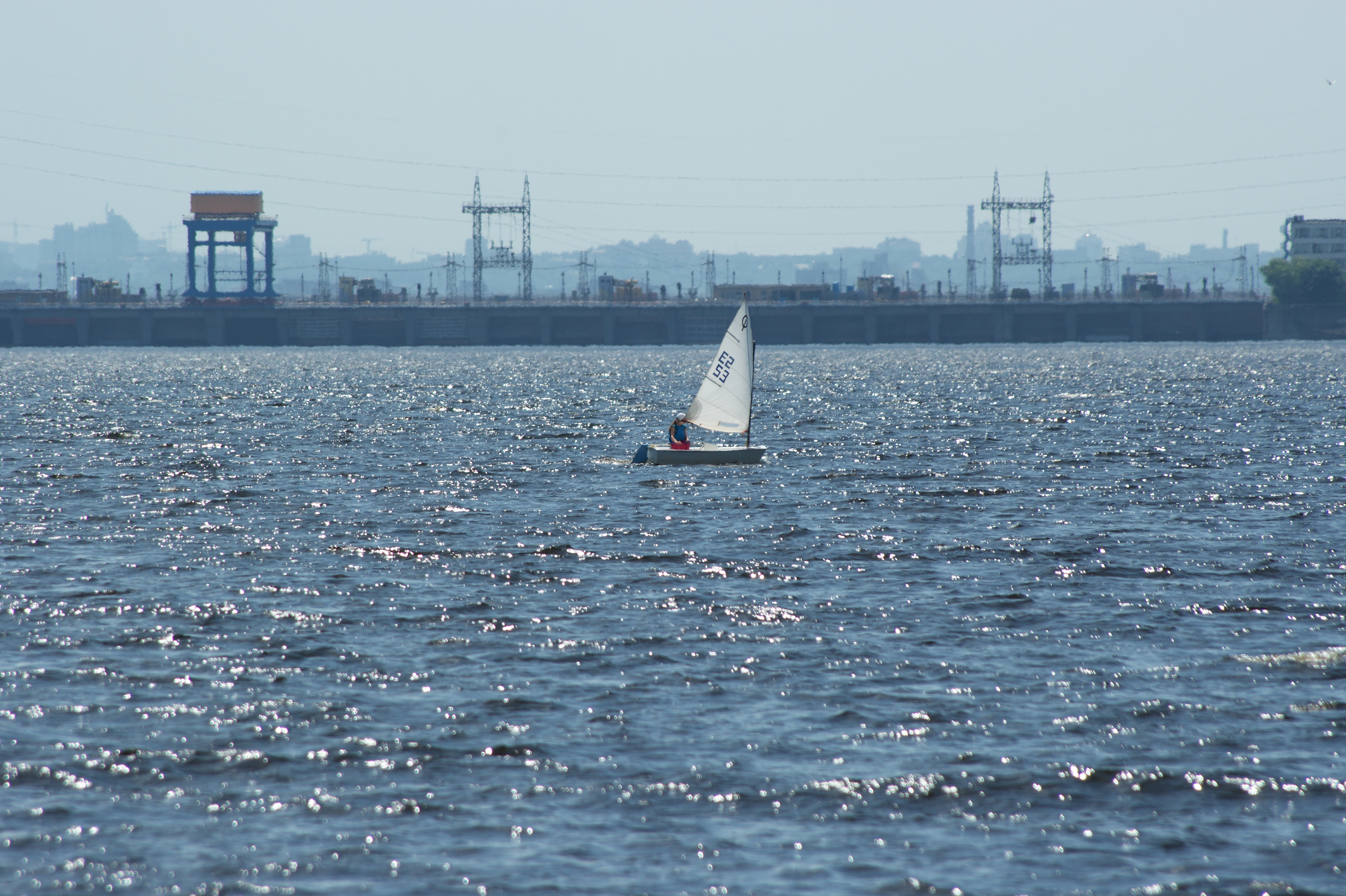

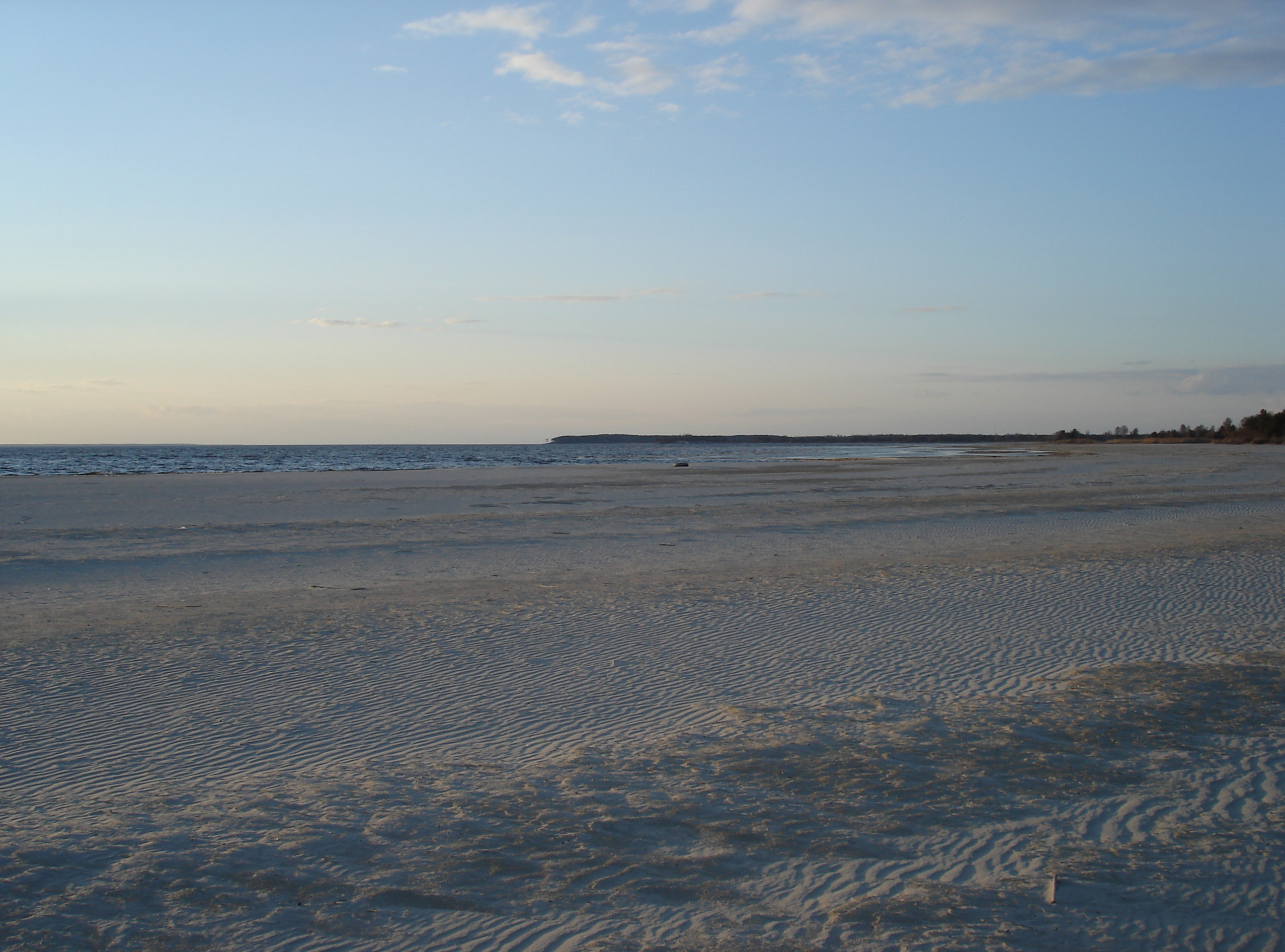

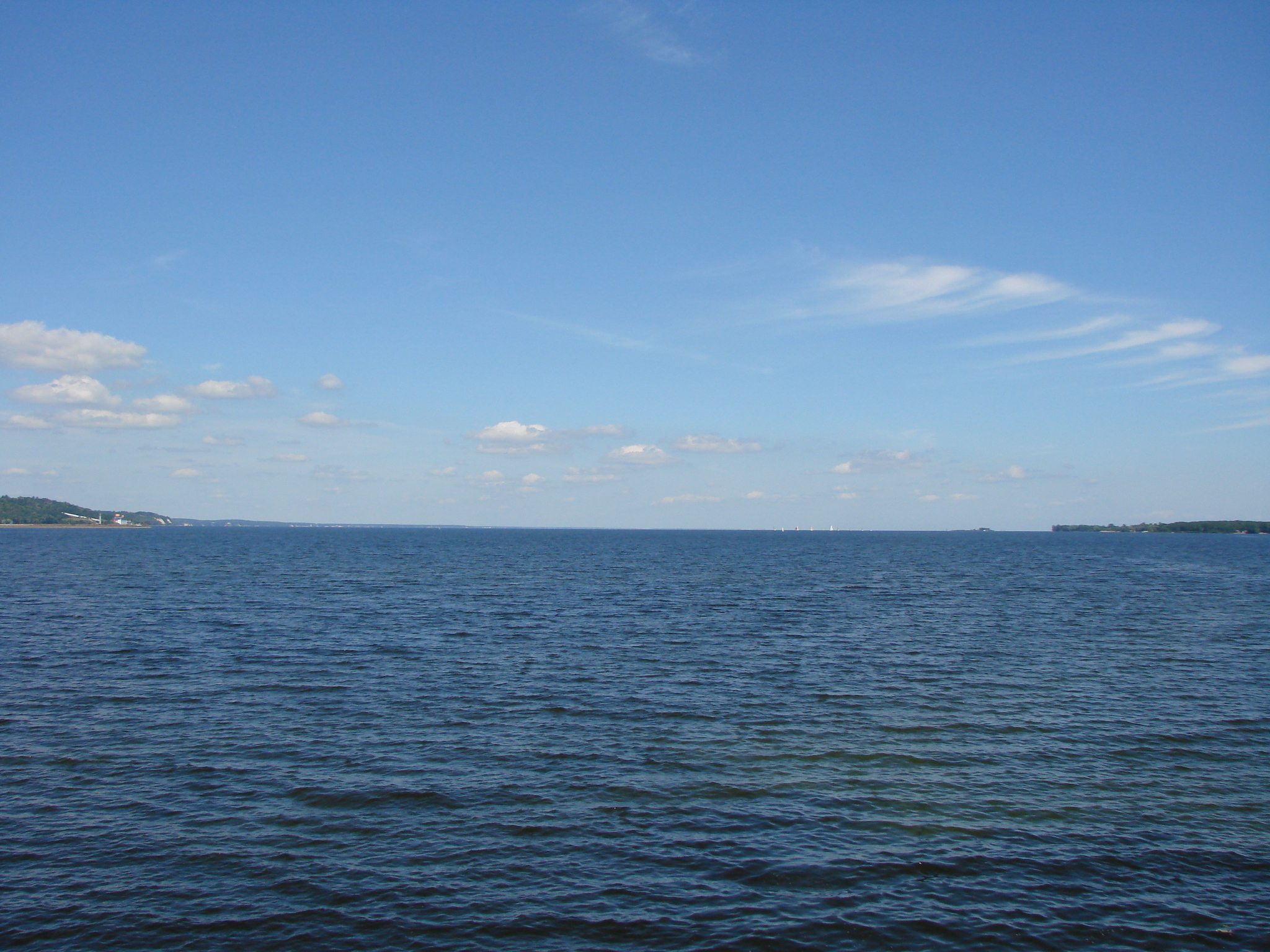

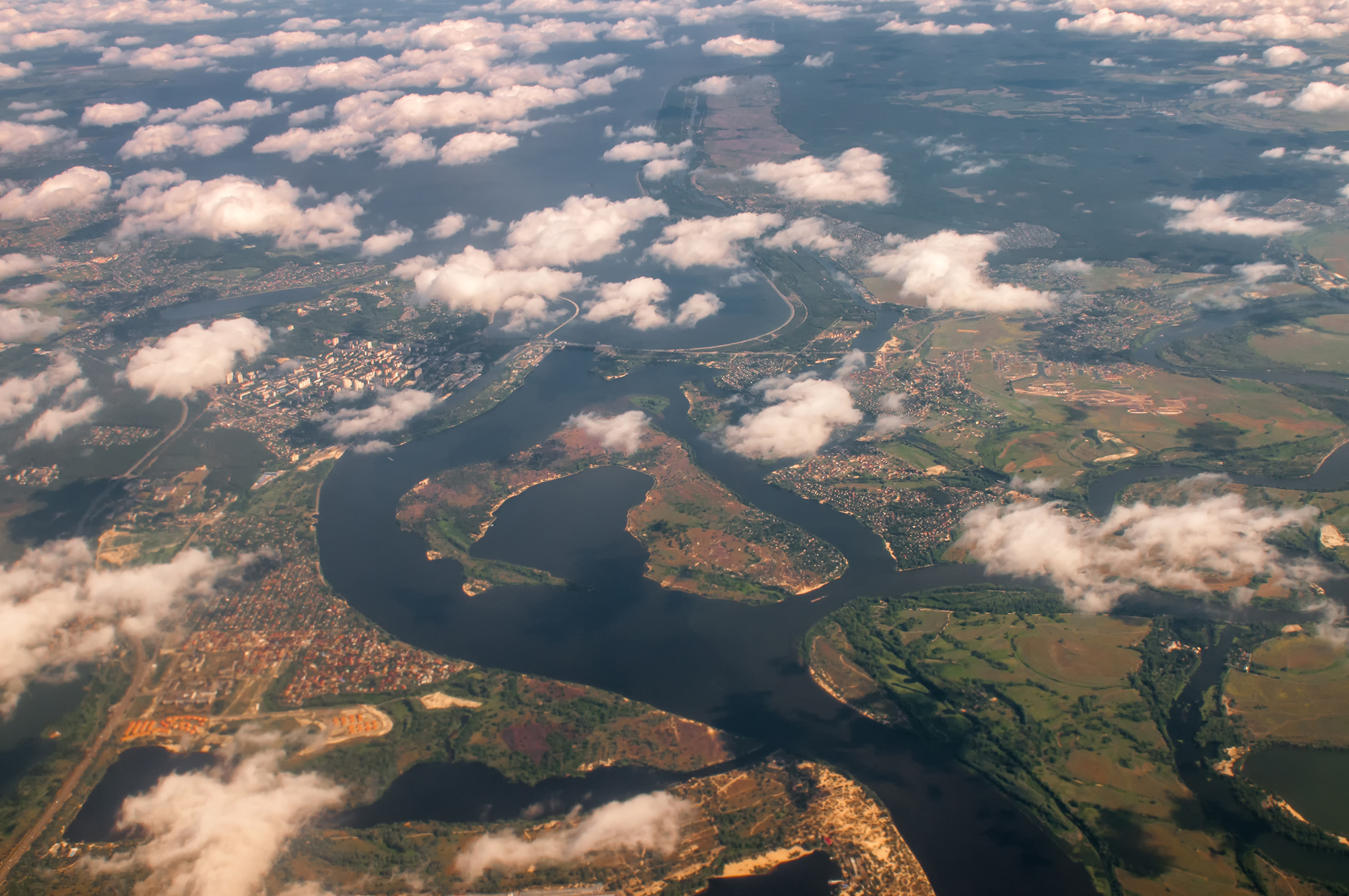

== See also ==
- Dnieper reservoir cascade
