= Andrii Nikonchuk =

Ukrainian soldier (1993–2022)

- Born: September 27, 1992; Volodymyr, Volyn Oblast, Ukraine
- Died: February 24, 2022 (aged 29); Kyiv Hydroelectric Power Station, Ukraine
- Military career
- Allegiance: Ukraine
- Branch: Armed Forces of Ukraine
- Rank: Soldier
- Conflicts: Russo-Ukrainian War; Russian invasion of Ukraine
- Awards: Order of the Gold Star (posthumously)

Andrii Valeriiovych Nikonchuk (Ukrainian: Андрій Валерійович Нікончук; 27 September 1992 – 24 February 2022) was a soldier in the Armed Forces of Ukraine and a participant in the Russian–Ukrainian war.

== Biography ==
Andrii Nikonchuk was born in 1993 in the city of Volodymyr, currently part of the Volodymyr community in the Volodymyrskyi district of Volyn Oblast, Ukraine.

He died on 24 February 2022 as a member of an anti-aircraft missile unit defending the Kyiv Hydroelectric Power Station against Russian air raids and missile strikes when a cruise missile launched by the Russian forces from the territory of the Republic of Belarus exploded near the anti-aircraft battery.

He was buried on 7 March 2022, at the Fedorivske Cemetery in the city of Volodymyr.

== Awards ==
He was posthumously awarded the title of "Hero of Ukraine" with the Order of the "Golden Star" (2022) for personal bravery and heroism demonstrated in defense of Ukraine's state sovereignty and territorial integrity, as well as loyalty to the military oath.
