= Kyiv Pumped Storage Power Plant =

Power plant in Ukraine

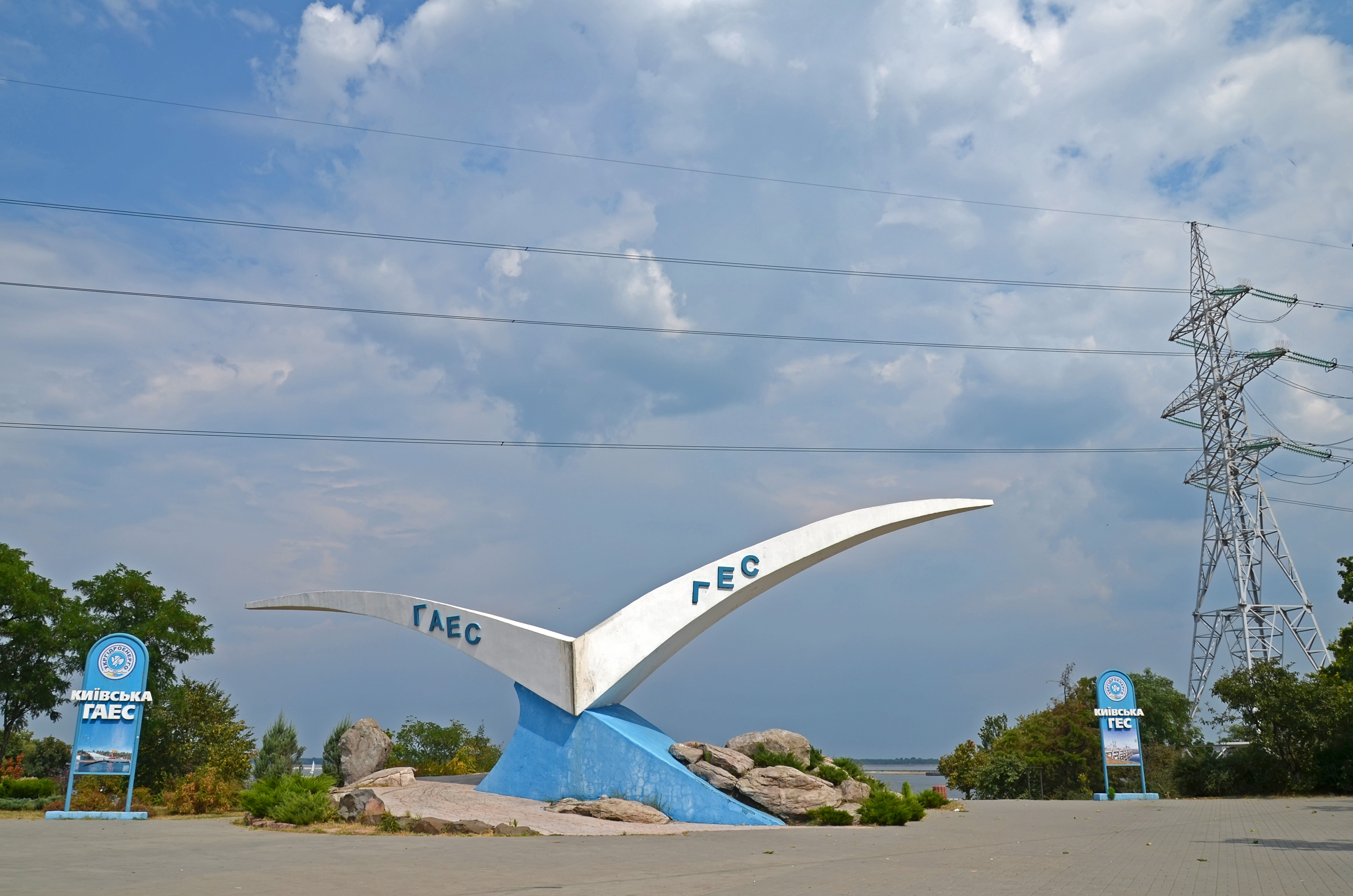
- Interactive map of Kyiv Pumped Storage Power Plant
- Official name: Київська ГАЕС
- Country: Ukraine
- Location: Kyiv raion
- Coordinates: 50°36′40.92″N 30°29′24.35″E
- Opening date: 1970-1972
- Operator: Ukrhydroenergo

Upper reservoir
- Creates: Upper Kyiv
- Total capacity: 3,700,000 m^{3} (3,000 acre⋅ft)

Lower reservoir
- Creates: Kyiv Reservoir
- Total capacity: 3,780,000,000 m^{3} (3,060,000 acre⋅ft)

Power Station
- Turbines: 3 x 33.3 MW
- Pump-generators: 3 x 45 MW reversible Francis turbine
- Installed capacity: 234.9 MW

The Kyiv Pumped Storage Power Plant (PSPP) (Ukrainian: Ки́ївська гідроакумулювальна електростанція (ГАЕС)) is a pumped-storage power station on the west bank of the Kyiv Reservoir in Vyshhorod, Ukraine. The Kyiv Reservoir serves as the lower reservoir and the upper reservoir is located 70 m (230 ft) above the lower. Water sent from the upper reservoir generates electricity with three 33.3 megawatts (44,700 hp) conventional hydroelectric generators and three 45 megawatts (60,000 hp) reversible pump generators. During periods of low demand, such as nighttime, the pump generators push water from the lower reservoir to the upper for use during peak hours. The first generator was commissioned in 1970, and the last in 1972.

== History ==
- 1963 - Beginning of the construction of the Kyiv hydroelectric power plant. The underwater part of the HPP building and the installation site was built;
- 1964 - filling of the Kievskaya HPP reservoir;
- 1970 - commissioning of the first hydroelectric unit of the pumped storage power plant;
- 1972 - completion of construction. The last, sixth, hydroelectric unit of the pumped storage power plant was put into operation.

== Specifications ==
The building of the pumped-storage power plant is connected with the upper basin by 6-pressure reinforced concrete and metal pipelines with a diameter of 3.8 m.

The upper basin was created at a height of 70 m above the level of the Kyiv reservoir with a useful volume - 3700000 cubic meters, where during the night decrease in energy consumption in the power system water is pumped. The upper reservoir is discharged in the evening hours at the time of the highest power consumption in the power system. Surface area - 0.67 sq. km, length - 1.45 km. Response depth - 6,7 m. The reservoir on the Dnieper River serves as the lower reservoir of the pumped storage power plant.

== Main characteristics ==
The main facilities of the pumped-storage power plant include the upper pumped-storage basin, the power plant building and the installation site. Six vertical hydroelectric units are installed in the building of the pumped-storage power plant. Three 41,5 MW units with radial axial turbines and three with pump turbines with 37 MW each in generator mode and 43 MW in pump mode.

The installed capacity of the hydroelectric power plant is 235.5 MW, and 135 MW is in pumping mode. Operating in pumping mode, the power plant fills the upper basin in 6 hours.

== Reconstruction ==
Stage I

At the initial stage of operation of the pump-turbine units, complications arose due to the significant vibration of the guide vanes. Vibration in different points of the hydro unit even with the optimal opening of the guide apparatus reached above the permitted.

Vibration studies of the main pump-turbine hydroelectric units of Kyiv HPP revealed the need to reconstruct the hydro-turbine equipment.

In 1987-1989 the pump-turbine equipment was reconstructed, namely:

- a new impeller with the reconstruction of the impeller chamber was installed;
- blades of the guide apparatus and its regulating ring were replaced;
- new servomotors of the guide vanes were installed;
- oil turbine bearing instead of a rubber bearing was installed;
- a new turbine cover was installed.

Stage II

After the reconstruction, the vibration characteristics of the hydraulic units were reduced to normal. The rated capacity of the pump-turbine unit in generator mode was increased from 33.4 MW to 37 MW.

At the same time, the mechanical speed controllers of PM-100 type on all hydroelectric units were replaced by the modern electro-hydraulic controllers of EGR-21M-100-11 type. This significantly increased the reliability of hydraulic unit control.

From 1997 to 2002 the electrical equipment was reconstructed and installed:

- 9 gas-insulated (instead of oil circuit breakers) 10.5 kV;
- 2 additional 110 kV gas-insulated block circuit-breakers
- modern protection systems on all units and blocks;
- new power transformer at Unit 1.

At Kyiv HPP in 2010-2014, reconstruction of hydroelectric units - motors with replacement of stator winding was performed. Speed regulators, excitation systems on all hydroelectric units and control systems were replaced. The plant process equipment (pneumatic system, regulation system) was reconstructed; new cells were installed on 10 kV auxiliary equipment with the replacement of cable networks. The frequency start system for hydraulic units GD-1, GD-3, and GD-5 in pumping mode was assembled and adjusted. ASCE (Automated System of Commercial Energy Metering) system was commissioned.

Works at Kyiv HEPP are under the UHE / TFCS1 / C / 3-13 contract for the reconstruction of Hydraulic Units 2, 4, and 6 with financing from the European Investment Bank and the European Bank for Reconstruction and Development. On October 1, 2019, hydroelectric unit No. 2 was put into commercial operation after reconstruction, while on October 28, 2020, hydroelectric unit No. 6 was put into operation. Due to the new turbine and generator installed, the increase in hydro capacity of one hydro unit increased by 5.8 MW, the total - 46.8 MW. Reconstruction of hydroelectric unit No. 4 is underway.

== See also ==
- Kyiv Hydroelectric Power Station
