= Dnipropetrovsk River Port =

Dnipro River Port
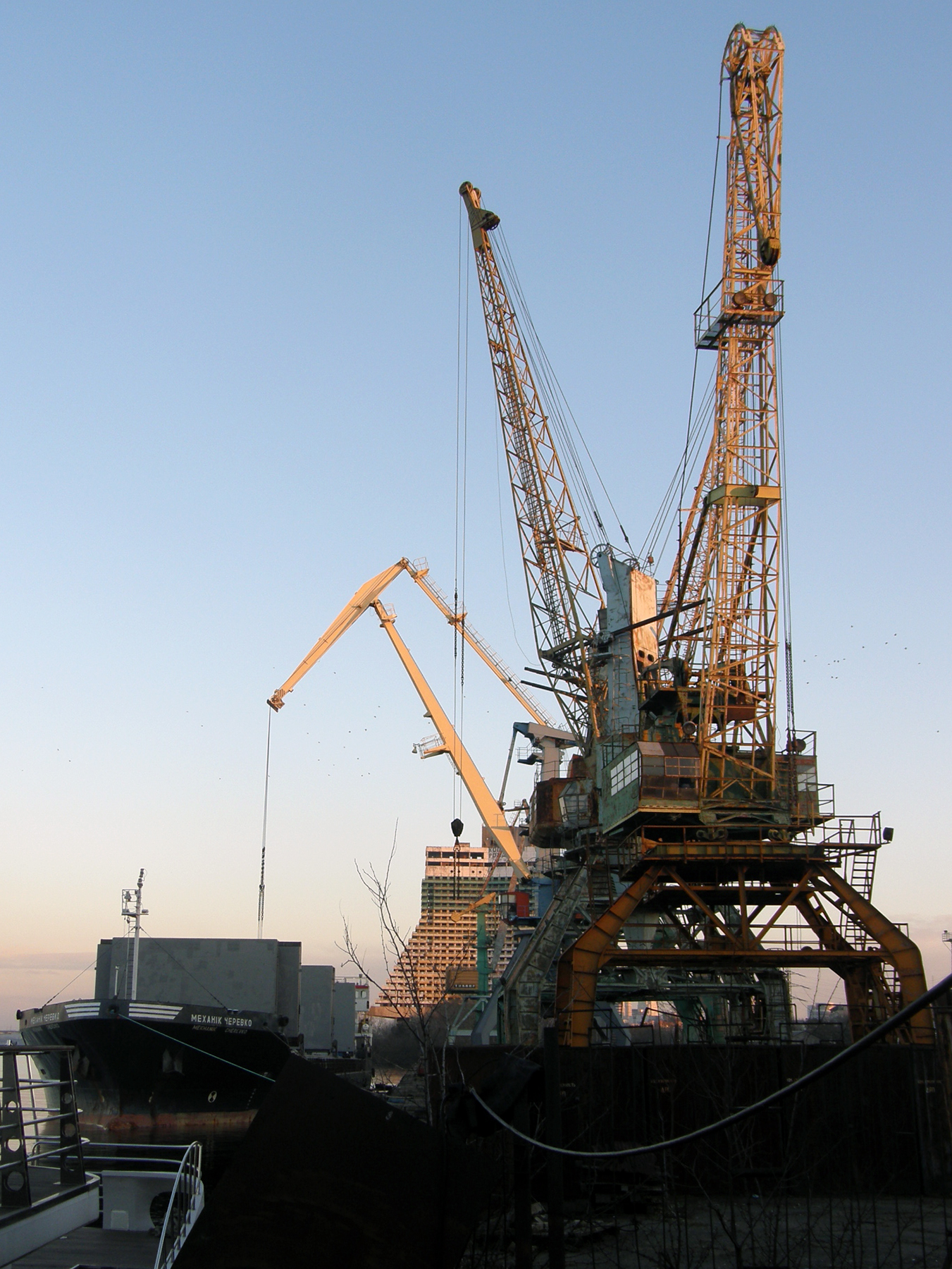
- Native name: Дніпровський річковий порт

Location
- Country: Ukraine
- Location: 49021, Dnipro, Amur-Havanʹ, 11

Details
- Owned by: Ukrrichflot
- No. of berths: 13
- Employees: 520
- Head of Port: Mykola Ostapovich Renkas

Statistics
- Annual cargo tonnage: 10 million tons

The Dniprovsk River Port (Ukrainian: Дніпровський річковий порт) is a state-owned enterprise of river transportation industry. The river port is located on the Dnieper in the city of Dnipro and specializes in processing a wide range of goods - grain, scrap metal, rolled metal, sand, gravel, feldspar, lumber, equipment, packaging in bulk and on pallets. The port's cargo processing capacity is 10 million tons per year. The number of employees is 520 people. The port area includes two cargo areas and 13 berths with a total length of 2250 meters.
