= Middle Dnieper Hydroelectric Station =

Hydroelectric station in Kamianske, Ukraine

Middle Dnieper Hydroelectric Power Plant
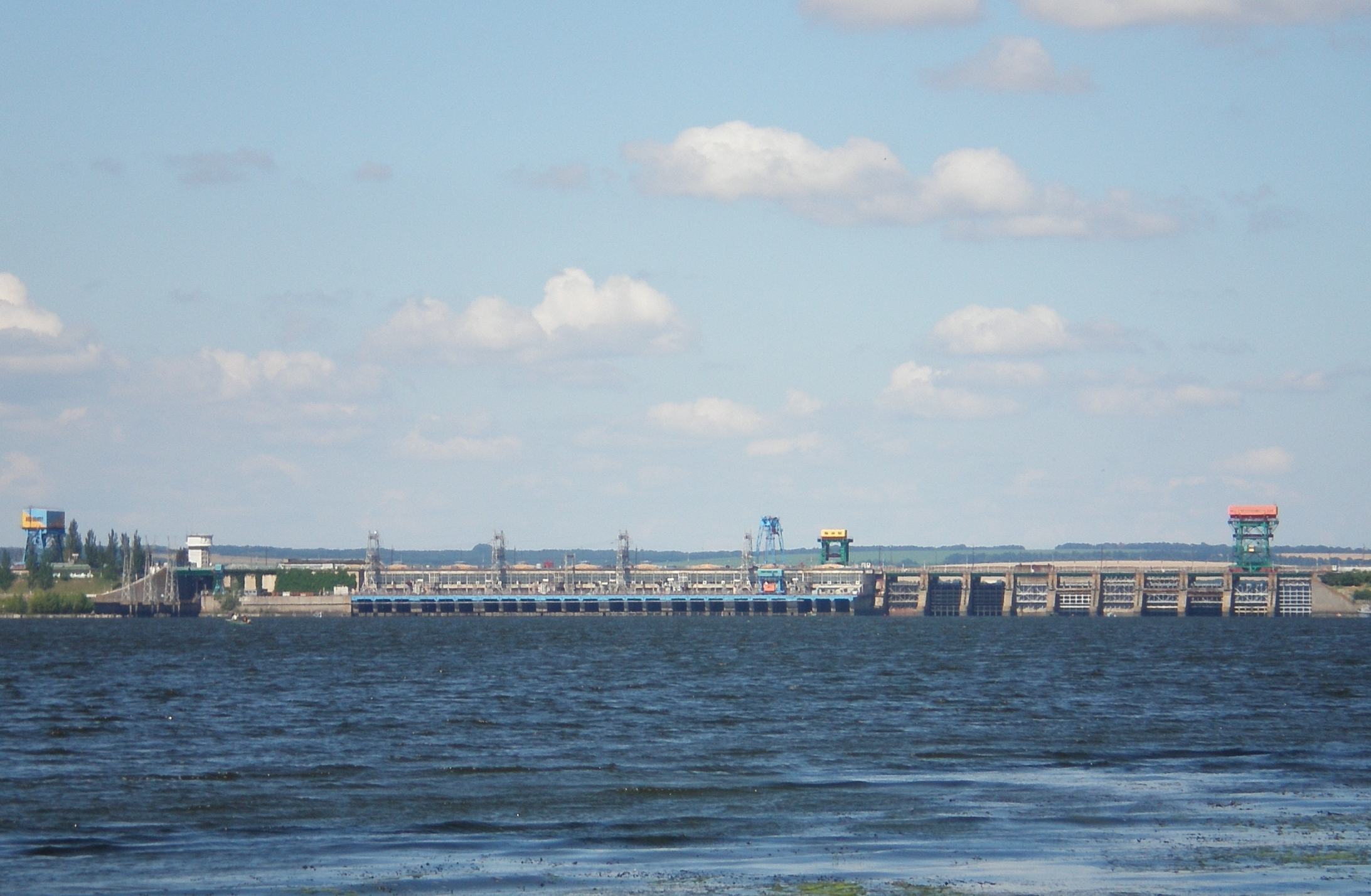
- View of power station and dam

- Location within Ukraine
- Official name: Середньодніпровська ГЕС
- Location: Kamianske, Dnipropetrovsk oblast
- Coordinates: 48°32′52.80″N 34°32′28.67″E
- Purpose: Power, navigation
- Status: Operational
- Construction began: 1956
- Opening date: 1963; 63 years ago
- Owner: Ukrhydroenergo

Dam and spillways
- Type of dam: Earth-fill embankment with gravity sections
- Impounds: Dnieper River
- Height: 15.5 m (51 ft)
- Length: 7,490 m (24,570 ft)

Reservoir
- Creates: Kamianske Reservoir
- Total capacity: 2,450,000,000 m^{3} (1,986,247 acre⋅ft)
- Surface area: 567 km^{2} (219 mi^{2})

Power Station
- Operator: Ukrhydroenergo
- Commission date: 1963-1964
- Turbines: 8 x 44 MW propeller
- Installed capacity: 352 MW
- Annual generation: 1.4 TWh

The Middle Dnieper Hydroelectric Station (Ukrainian: Середньодніпровська ГЕС, romanized: Seredniodniprovska HES) is a run-of-river power plant on the Dnieper River in Kamianske, Ukraine, operated by Ukrhydroenergo.

The primary purpose of the dam is hydroelectric power generation and navigation. It is the fourth dam in the Dnieper cascade. The dam has an associated lock and a power station with an installed capacity of 352 MW. Construction on the dam began in 1956 and the last generator was commissioned in 1964. Until 2016, the plant was named Dniprodzerzhynska HES, after the Soviet name of the town of Kamianske.

== See also ==
- Hydroelectricity in Ukraine
