= Ukrhydroenergo =

Ukrainian hydro power company

Private JSC «Ukrhydroenergo»
- Logo since 2020
- Native name: ПрАТ "Укргідроенерго"
- Type: Public company
- Industry: Hydropower
- Founded: 1994
- Headquarters: Vyshhorod, Kyiv Oblast, Ukraine
- Area served: Ukraine
- Key people: Bogdan Sukhetskyi (CEO);
- Products: Electric power
- Number of employees: 3200 (2021)
- Website: en.uhe.gov.ua

Private JSC «Ukrhydroenergo» (Ukrainian: ПрАТ "Укргідроенерго", romanized: PrAT 'Ukrhidroenerho') is a Ukrainian state-owned enterprise that administers hydro power plants along the Dnieper and Dniester rivers.

Ukrhydroenergo is Ukraine's main hydropower generating company and provides FCAS for the United Energy Systems of Ukraine (UESU). The company operates ten power plants on the Dnieper and Dniester rivers: Kyivska HPP, Kyivska PSP, Kanivska HPP, Kremenchutska HPP, Seredniodniprovska HPP, Dniprovska HPP No. 1, Dniprovska HPP No. 2, Kakhovka HPP, Dnistrovska HPP, and Dnistrovska PSP. Enabling works are underway at Kanivska PSP and Kakhovka HPP No. 2.

== Strategic development plan ==
The company's strategic goal is to supply the electricity to Ukraine's grid and secure the capacity reserve with water resources of the Dnieper and Dniester rivers. Ukrhydroenergo's strategic development plan is underpinned by Hydropower Development Programme 2026 approved by the Cabinet of Ministers of Ukraine on 13 July 2016 (Resolution No. 552-r), Ukraine Energy Strategy 2035, and the Strategy for Sustainable Development "Ukraine 2020" approved by the President of Ukraine (Decree No. 5/2015 dated 12 January 2015).

== International cooperation ==
The establishment of the Ukrainian-Moldovan Commission for the Sustainable Use and Protection of the Dniester Basin was a new stage in cross-border cooperation between Ukraine and Moldova. The Dniester Commission will contribute to finding effective solutions to environmental problems on both sides of the Dniester.

Cooperation with financial organisations and institutions is an important area of international activities to raise financial investments. Ukrhydroenergo cooperates with the International Bank for Reconstruction and Development, the European Bank for Reconstruction and Development, and the European Investment Bank under Ukrhydroenergo Hydropower Rehabilitation Project.
