= Dnieper rapids =

Rapids on the Dnieper river in Ukraine

Coordinates: 48°11′00″N 35°11′20″E

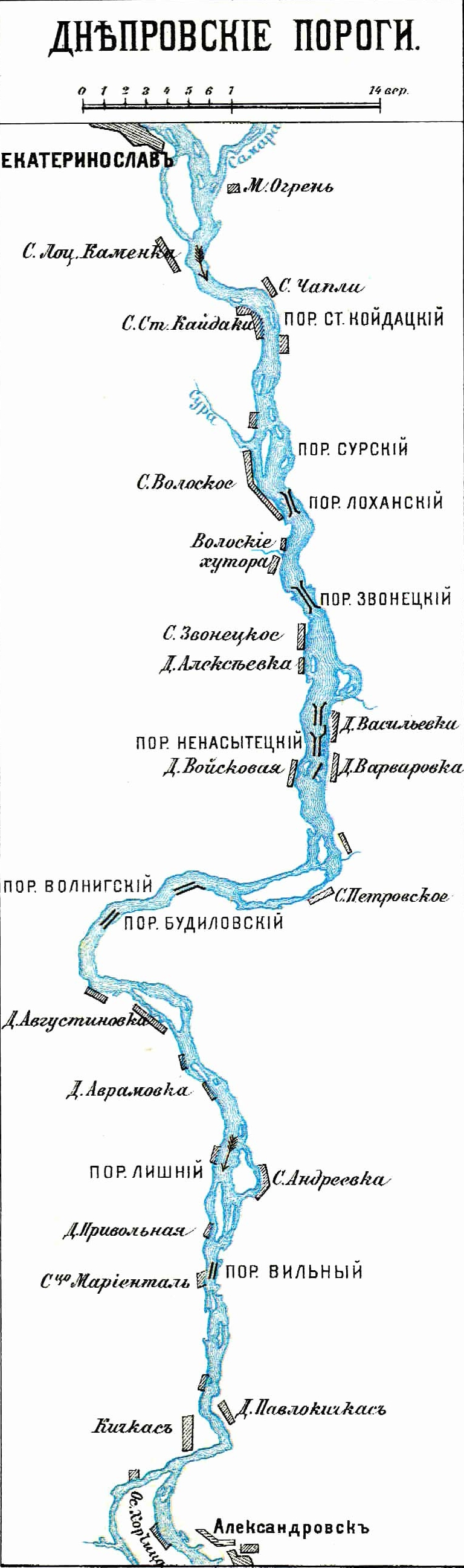
Dnieper Rapids between Yekaterinoslav (now Dnipro) and Aleksandrovsk (now Zaporizhzhia).

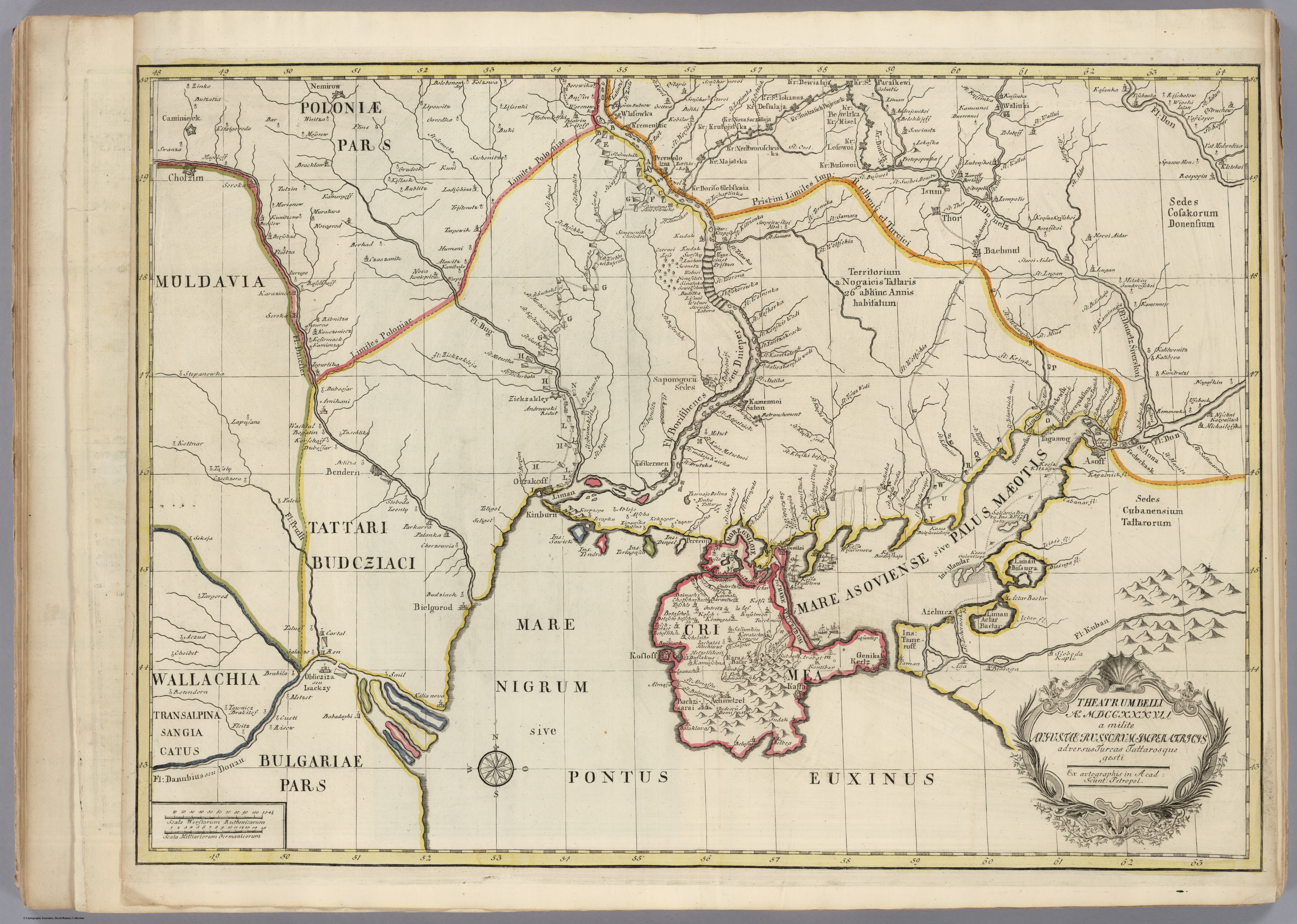
the Dnieper rapids shown on the 18th century map (Kudak, Sursky, Luchan, Swonetz, Wolnoi, Nenasitetz, Sinaluka, Sowolscheni, Buditka, Lisnai, Wolnoi, Sternik, Zobora)

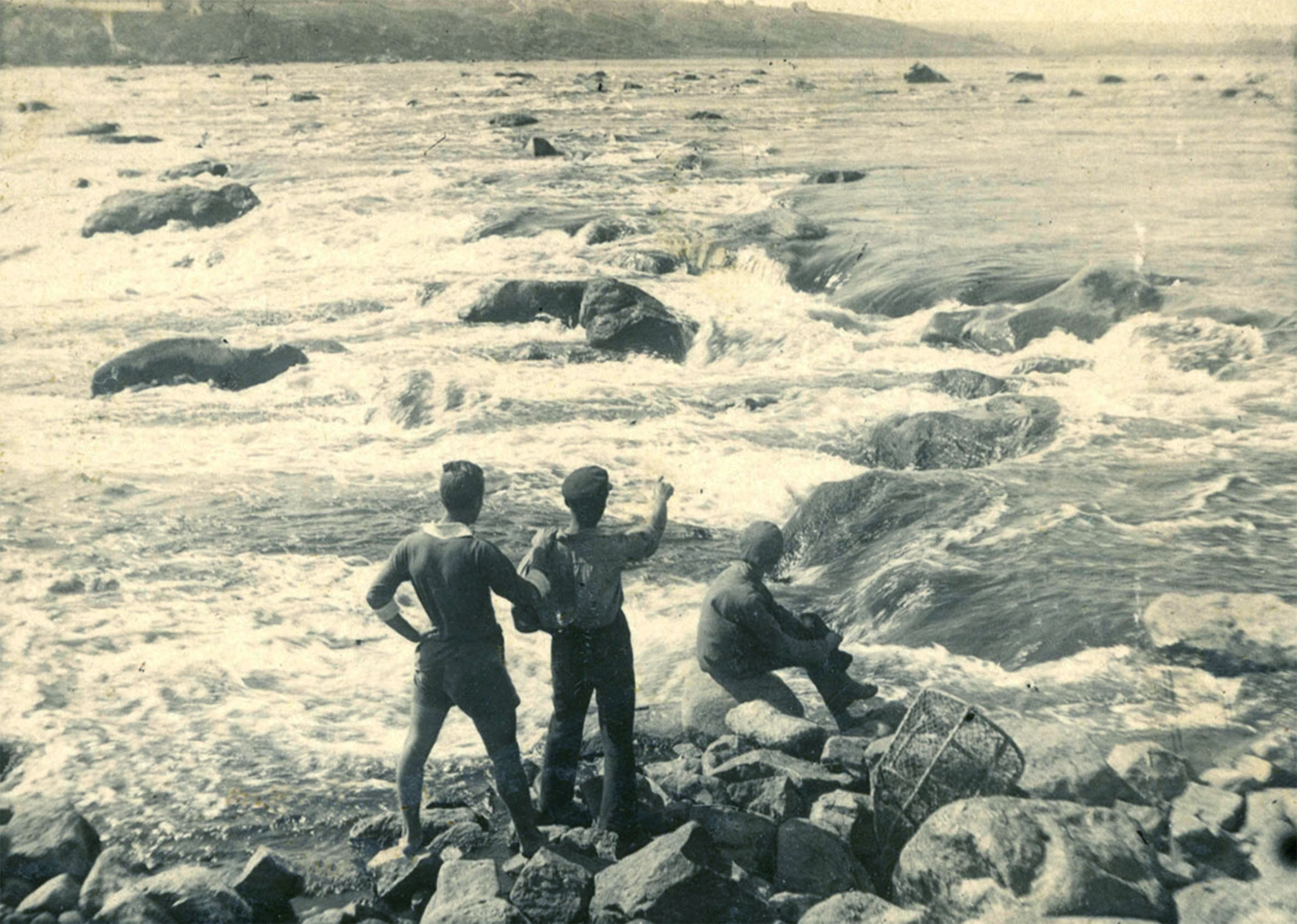
Dnieper rapids, 1920s

The Dnieper rapids (Ukrainian: Дніпрові пороги, romanized: Dniprovi porohy), also known as cataracts of the Dnieper, were the historical rapids on the Dnieper river in Ukraine, caused by outcrops of granites, gneisses and other types of bedrock of the Ukrainian Shield. The rapids began below the present-day city of Dnipro (formerly Kodak Fortress, Katerynoslav/Yekaterinoslav), where the river turns to the south, and dropped 50 meters in 66 kilometers, ending before the present-day city of Zaporizhzhia (whose name literally means "beyond the rapids").

There were nine major rapids (some sources give a smaller number), about 30–40 smaller rapids and 60 islands and islets. The rapids almost totally obstructed the navigation of the river.

After the Dnieper Hydroelectric Station was built at Zaporizhzhia in 1932, the rapids were inundated by the Dnieper Reservoir.

== Historical mentions ==
The Dnieper rapids were part of the route from the Varangians to the Greeks first mentioned in the Primary Chronicle. The route was probably established in the late eighth and early ninth centuries and gained significant importance from the tenth until the first third of the eleventh century. On the Dnieper the travelers had to portage their ships round seven rapids, where they had to be on guard for Pecheneg nomads.

The rapids were mentioned in Emperor Constantine VII's work De Administrando Imperio and in The Tale of Igor's Campaign.

In his Description of Ukraine (1651, 1660), French military engineer Guillaume Le Vasseur de Beauplan lamented how the rapids of the Borysthenes (the ancient Greco-Roman name for the Dnipro, which persisted in early modern Western Europe) severely limited the export potential of agricultural produce from Ukraine to Constantinople and beyond (here in the 1704 English translation):

"The Land [of Ukraine] is so fruitful, it often produces such plenty of Corn, they know not what to do with it, because they have no navigable Rivers that fall into the Sea, except the Boristhenes, which is not navigable 50 Leagues below Kiow, or Kiovia, by reason of 13 Falls on it, the last of which is seven Leagues distant from the first, which makes a good days Journey, as may be seen in the Map. This it is that hinders them carrying their Corn to Constantinople (...)."

== Names of the major rapids ==
In Ukrainian tradition, there were 9 major rapids (given in the direction of the river flow as shown in the picture on the right):

1. Kodatskyi porih (Ukrainian: Кодацький поріг). The Kodak Fortress formerly stood near this rapid.
2. Surskyi porih (Ukrainian: Сурський поріг). Almost all the rocks of this rapid were submerged in shallow water.
3. Lokhanskyi porih (Ukrainian: Лоханський поріг)
4. Dzvonetskyi porih (Ukrainian: Дзвонецький поріг)
5. Nenasytetskyi porih, or Nenasytets (Ukrainian: Ненаситецький поріг, Ненаситець, lit. 'Insatiable' ) or Revuchyi (Ukrainian: Ревучий, lit. 'Roaring' ), the biggest and most dangerous of the rapids, called Peklo (Ukrainian: Пекло, lit. 'Hell' ) by the locals, 2.4 km long and over 1 km wide. Its roaring could be heard several kilometers away.
6. Vovnyzkyi porih (Ukrainian: Вовнизький поріг)
7. Budylskyi porih (Ukrainian: Будильський поріг)
8. Lyshnii porih (Ukrainian: Лишній поріг, superfluous). This name is most likely because it was the least dangerous, posing almost no problems for navigation.
9. Vilnyi porih (Ukrainian: Вільний поріг, free)

Names given in transcription from the Ukrainian language.

Correspondence of some of the names from different historical sources is seen in the table below:

Slavonic and Norse names of the Dnieper rapids, with translations, and Constantine's Greek spelling
Modern (Ukrainian)	Slavonic	Norse
1.	Ne sŭpi, 'Don't Sleep' (Εσσουπη)	Sof eigi, 'Don't Sleep'
2. Surs'kyj porih, 'Severe One'	Ostrovĭnyj pragŭ, 'Island-waterfall' (Οστροβουνιπραχ)	Holmfors, 'Island-Waterfall' (Ουλβορσι)
3. Lochans'kyj porih
4. Dzvonets'[kyj] porih, 'Clanger'		Gellandi, 'Roaring' (Γελανδρι)
5. Nenasytets'[kyj] porih, 'Insatiable'	Nejasytĭ, 'pelican (which nested there) (Νεασητ)	Eyforr, 'ever violent' (Αειφορ)
6. Vovnyz'kyj porih, '[place] of waves'	Vlŭnĭnyj pragŭ, 'wave-waterfall' (Βουλνηπραχ)	Bárufors, 'wave-waterfall' (Βαρουφορος)
7. Tavolžans'ka zabora, Tavolžans'kyi porih	Vĭruči, 'boiling' (Βερουτζη)	Hlæjandi, 'laughing' (Λεαντι)
8. Lyshnij porih, 'superfluous'	Naprjazi?, 'bend, strain?' (Ναπρεζη); Na bŭrzŭ?, 'quick?'	Strukum, '[at the] rapids' (Στρουκουν)

== See also ==
- Great Meadow, another natural and historic area that was flooded by a reservoir in southern Ukraine
