= Kremenchuk River Port =

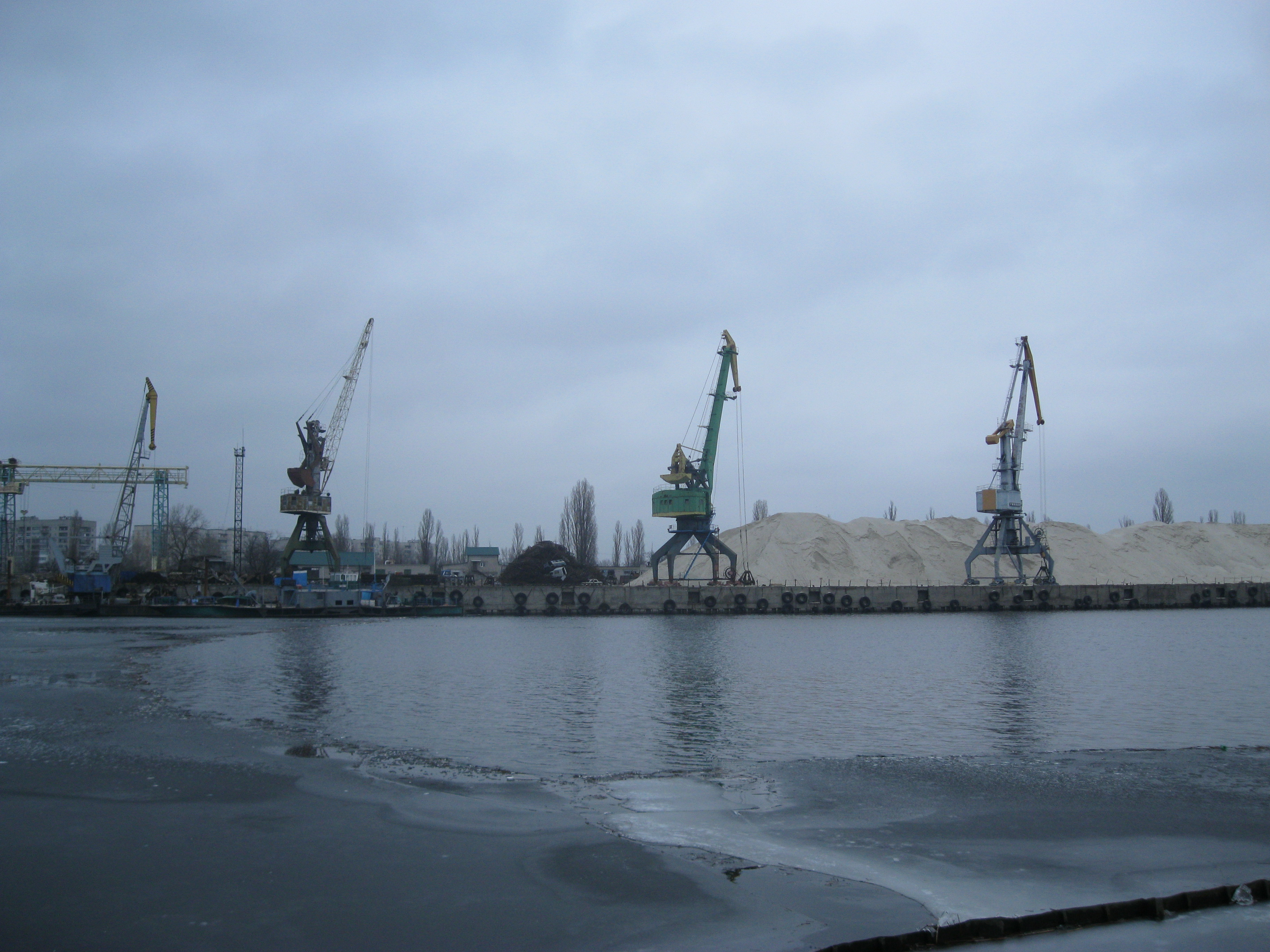
- Native name: Кременчуцький річковий порт

Location
- Country: Ukraine
- Location: Kremenchuk, Flotska Street, 2

Details
- Opened: 1823
- Owned by: PJSC "Kremenchug river port"
- Size: 21.4 hectares

Statistics
- Annual cargo tonnage: 5 million tons
- Website www.krrp.net

Kremenchuk River Port also called Kremenchug River Port is a port located on the Dnipro in the city of Kremenchuk, Poltava Oblast, Ukraine. The Port of Kremenchuk has seven piers (4 on the Dnipro and 3 on the rivers Donets, Sula, and Vorskla), as well as river stations in Kremenchuk, Svitlovodsk, and Horishni Plavni.

The repair base of the port consists of:

- ship repair shops
- a floating dock for lifting and repairing self-propelled and non-self-propelled vessels
- a stern lift with a capacity of 320 tons

The port has the ability to send and receive cargo by river, road, and rail. The material base of the port includes: fleet, cargo section, dock, and ship repair shops. The port is open to river-sea vessels (up to 120 m long and up to 3.5 m draft). It is also possible to ship cargo in five-ton containers and in international 20-foot containers. Cargo processing is carried out by gantry cranes with a carrying capacity of 5-20 tons by transshipment from one mode of transport to another (including rail, road, and water). The port has specialized open warehouses and closed warehouses for storage of these cargoes.
