= Kyiv Hydroelectric Power Plant =

Hydroelectric power station in Vyshhorod, Ukraine

Kyiv Hydroelectric Station
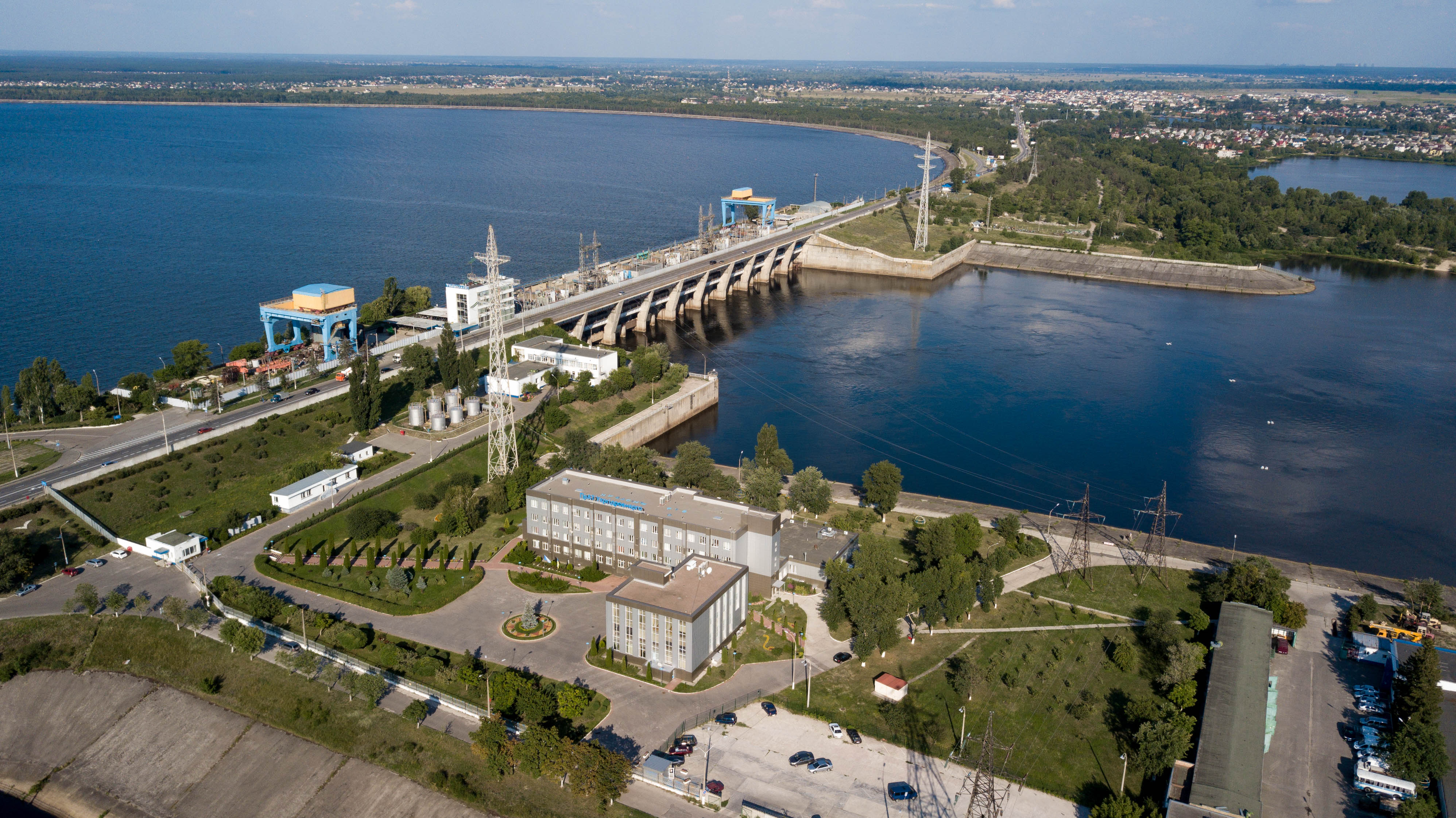
- View of station from Vyshhorod

- Location within Ukraine
- Location: Vyshhorod, Ukraine
- Coordinates: 50°35′18.02″N 30°30′44.36″E
- Purpose: Power, navigation
- Status: Operational
- Opening date: 1964; 62 years ago

Dam and spillways
- Type of dam: Earth-fill embankment with gravity sections
- Impounds: Dnieper River
- Length: 288 m (945 ft)
- Spillway capacity: 12,500 m^{3}/s (441,433 cu ft/s)

Reservoir
- Creates: Kyiv Reservoir
- Total capacity: 3,780×10^{6} m^{3} (3,064,496 acre⋅ft)
- Surface area: 922 km^{2} (356 mi^{2})

Power Station
- Operator: Ukrhydroenergo
- Commission date: 1964-1968
- Hydraulic head: 12 m (39 ft)
- Turbines: 20; 4 x 22.7 MW, 16 x 20.5 MW bulb turbine
- Installed capacity: 418.8 MW
- Annual generation: 683 GWh

Kyiv Hydroelectric Power Plant (Ukrainian: Київська ГЕС, romanized: Kyivska HES, lit. 'Kyiv Hydroelectric Station') is a run-of-river power plant on the Dnieper River in Vyshhorod, Kyiv Oblast, Ukraine. The 288 m (945 ft) long dam creates the Kyiv Reservoir with the purpose of hydroelectric power generation and navigability with the dam's associated lock. The first of 20 generators in the power station was commissioned in 1964, and the last in 1968. Together with the Kyiv Pumped Storage Power Plant, it creates a hydroelectricity generating complex. It is operated by the Ukrhydroenergo. Turbines for the plant were produced by the Kharkiv Factory Turboatom, and generators by the Kharkiv Factory "Elektrovazhmash".

== History ==
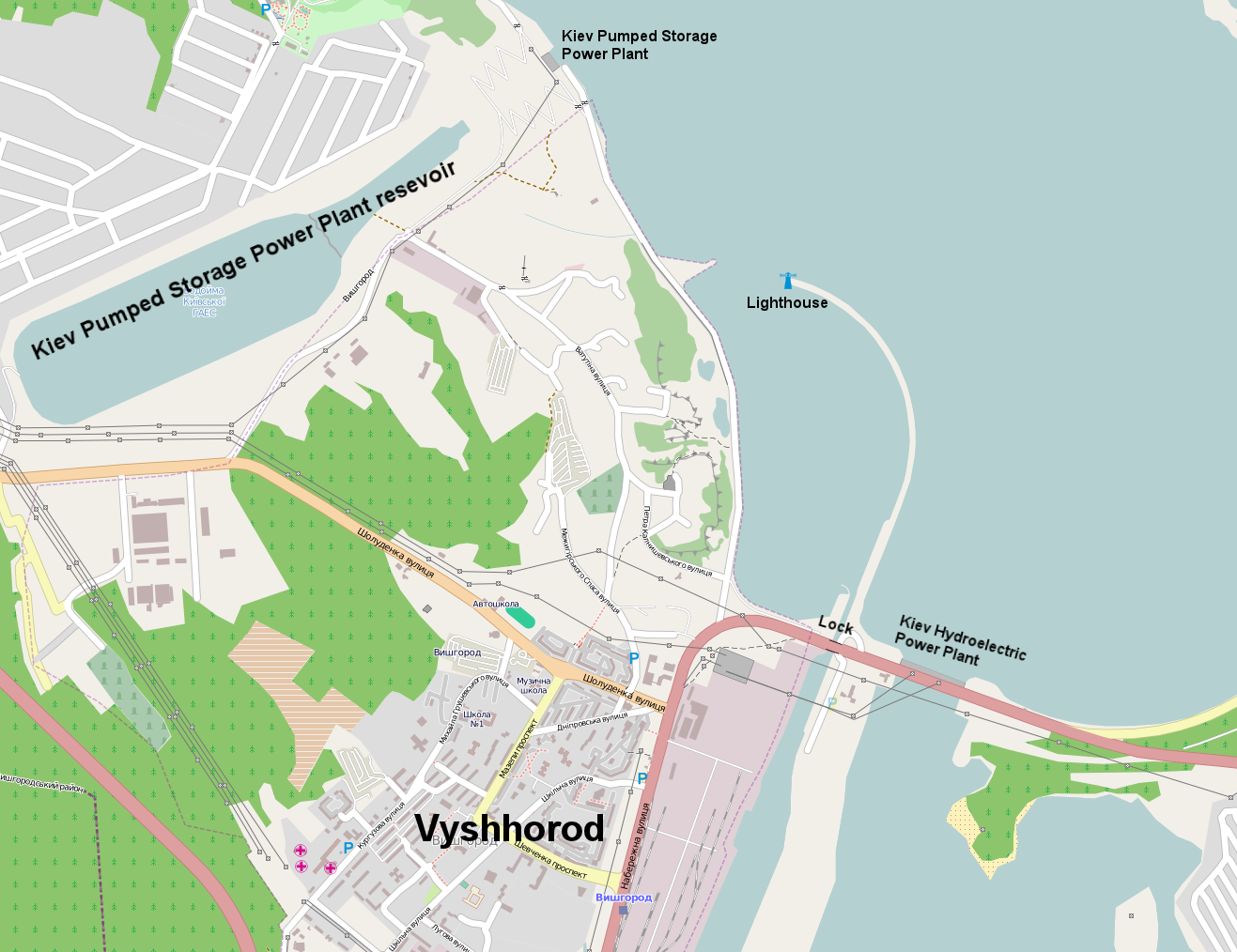
Kyiv Power generating complex near Vyshhorod

The decision to build the plant started in August 1959, and construction began the following year in 1960 under the institute "Ukrhydroproekt". Construction was completed in eight years, with the first of 20 generators being commissioned in December 1964 and the last in 1968. During this time, the Kyiv Reservoir was also created by the dam, and was filled between 1964 and 1966. The plant's design service life was set at 100 years, using methods that accounted for hydrological, wind, and seismic factors, among other things. Viacheslav Chornovil, later a well known Soviet dissident, served as the Secretary of the Komsomol for the site during its construction. In May 1969, a major strike occurred at the station under I. Hryshchuk.

Since 1996, a major renovation of the plant has been underway, which includes the reconstruction and replacement of equipment. The first stage was completed from 1997 and 2002, when 12 of the generators were reconstructed. The second stage started in 2006 to renovate the remaining 8 generators. A major renovation also later took place in 2018 and 2019.

== Russo-Ukrainian War ==
On 24 February 2022, during the Russian invasion of Ukraine, Andrii Nikonchuk died defending the Kyiv Hydroelectric Power Plant from Russian air raids. On 26 August 2024, an energy facility of the complex was damaged in a Russian attack. The attack hit one of the hydroelectric dams. In July 2025, the European Bank for Reconstruction and Development announced they were considering providing financing to Ukrhydroenergo due to wartime destruction, including for some hydromechanical equipment at the plant. Throughout the war, concerns have been raised over the effects of flooding caused by a possible dam collapse on the Kyiv area in case of an attack.

== See also ==
- Hydroelectricity in Ukraine
- List of power stations in Ukraine
