= Kamianske Reservoir =

Reservoir on the Dnieper river in Ukraine

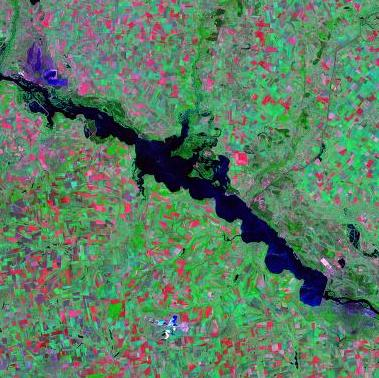
- Landsat satellite photo

- Location within Poltava Oblast
- Interactive map of Kamianske Reservoir
- Location: Kamianske (to the south), Poltava, Kirovohrad and Dnipropetrovsk Oblasts, Ukraine
- Coordinates: 48°48′N 34°06′E
- Type: Hydroelectric reservoir
- Primary inflows: Dnieper River
- Primary outflows: Dnieper River
- Catchment area: 567 km^{2} (219 sq mi)
- Basin countries: Russia, Belarus, Ukraine
- Max. length: 114 km (71 mi)
- Max. width: 8 km (5.0 mi)
- Surface area: 567 km^{2} (219 sq mi)
- Max. depth: 15 m (49 ft)
- Water volume: 2.45 km^{3} (1,990,000 acre⋅ft)
- Surface elevation: 104 m (341 ft)

The Kamianske Reservoir (Ukrainian: Кам'янське водосховище, Kamians'ke vodoskhovyshche) is a reservoir located on the lower part of the Dnieper river in the Dnipropetrovsk Oblast of Ukraine, one of five of Dnieper reservoir cascade. Named after the name of the city of Kamianske, the reservoir is mainly used for generating hydroelectric power, transportation, fish farming, and human consumption. Its water level is maintained by the dam of the Middle Dnieper Hydroelectric Power Plant, constructed from 1963 to 1965.

The ports of Kremenchuk and the Dnieper Mineral Enrichment Complex in Horishni Plavni are located on the reservoir, with access being limited when the reservoir freezes over during the winter.

The reservoir has a length of 114 km, a width of 5 km (8 km max.), an area of 567 km^{2}, a depth of 15 meters, and a volume of 2.45 km^{3}.

== See also ==
- Kremenchuk River Port
