= Kaniv Hydroelectric Power Plant =

Hydroelectric power plant on the Dnieper in Kaniv, Ukraine

- The dam of Kaniv Hydroelectric Power Plant
- Interactive map of Kaniv Hydroelectric Power Plant
- Location: Kaniv, Ukraine
- Coordinates: 49°45′59.5″N 31°28′18.2″E
- Construction began: 1964
- Opening date: November 4, 1972 (first turbine) – April 16, 1975 (completion)
- Owner: Government of Ukraine

Dam and spillways
- Type of dam: power plant
- Impounds: Dnieper River
- Height: 39.5 m (130 ft)
- Length: 343 m (1,125 ft)
- Spillway capacity: 13,200 m^{3}/s (466,154 cu ft/s)

Reservoir
- Creates: (Run-of-river)
- Total capacity: 2.6 km^{3} (2,107,854 acre⋅ft)

Power Station
- Operator: Ukrhydroenergo
- Turbines: 24 x 18.5 MW
- Installed capacity: 444 MW
- Annual generation: 972 GWh

Kaniv Hydroelectric Power Plant (Ukrainian: Канівська ГЕС) is a hydroelectricity generating complex on the Dnieper river in Kaniv, Ukraine. It is operated by Ukrhydroenergo, a subsidiary of the state-owned Energy Company of Ukraine. The dam has a 288 by 18 metres (945 ft × 59 ft) single-stage, single chamber lock to enable travel along the Dnieper river.

== History ==
Planning for the power plant's facilities was conducted by UkrHydroProject, a department of the Ukrainian State Research and Project Institute. Construction was contracted out to specialized construction companies, lasting from 1964 to 1972. The plant's turbines and generators were produced by the Kharkiv branches of Turboatom and Elektrovazhmash, respectively.

Renovation of the Kaniv Hydroelectric Power Plant started in 1997. The first stage of renovation was financed through the IBRD, completing in June 2002. The second stage was financed by the Ukrainian government, supplemented by a US$106 million investment by the World Bank, completing in 2017.

== See also ==
- Hydroelectricity in Ukraine
