= Kremenchuk Hydroelectric Power Plant =

Hydroelectric power plant in Svitlovodsk, Ukraine

Kremenchuk Dam
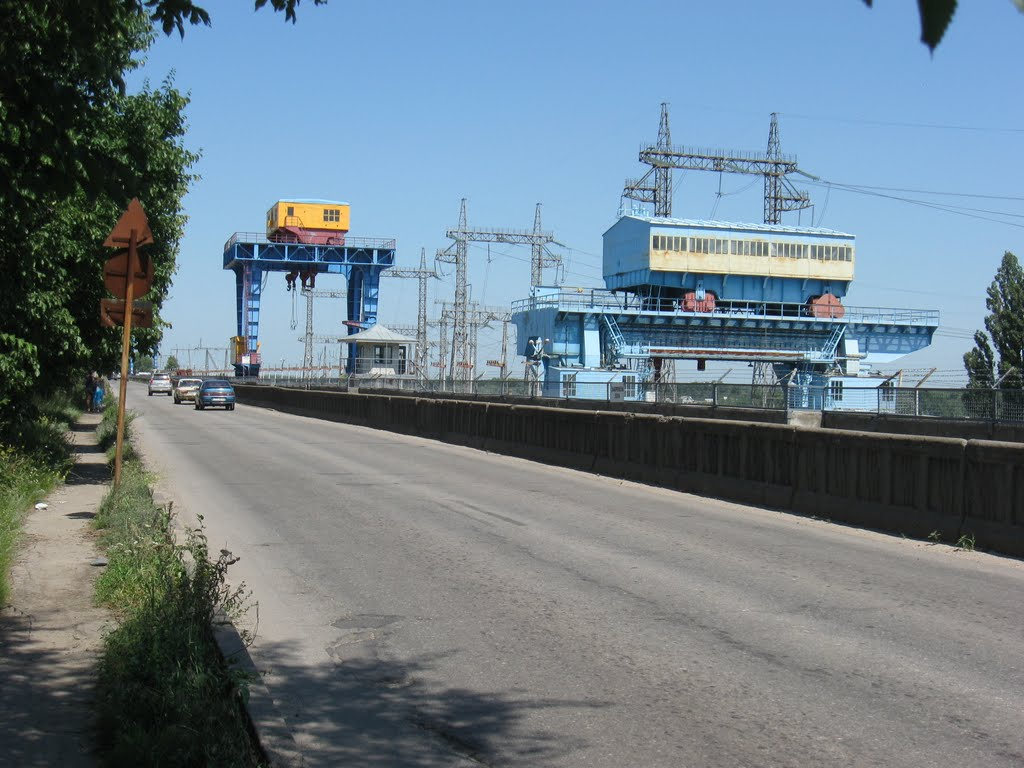
- Top of power plant
- Interactive map of Kremenchuk Dam
- Official name: Кременчуцька ГЕС
- Location: Svitlovodsk, Ukraine
- Coordinates: 49°4′39.13″N 33°15′02.17″E
- Purpose: Power, navigation
- Status: Operational
- Construction began: 1954
- Opening date: 1959; 67 years ago
- Owner: Government of Ukraine

Dam and spillways
- Type of dam: Earth-fill embankment with gravity sections
- Impounds: Dnieper River
- Length: 10,500 m (34,400 ft)

Reservoir
- Creates: Kremenchuk Reservoir
- Total capacity: 13,520×10^{6} m^{3} (10,960,842 acre⋅ft)
- Active capacity: 8,700×10^{6} m^{3} (7,053,205 acre⋅ft)
- Surface area: 2,250 km^{2} (869 mi^{2})
- Maximum length: 172 km (107 mi)
- Maximum width: 40 km (25 mi)

Power Station
- Operator: Ukrhydroenergo
- Commission date: 1959-1960
- Hydraulic head: 14.2 m (47 ft)
- Turbines: 12 x 52 MW propeller
- Installed capacity: 624 MW
- Annual generation: 1.5 TWh

The Kremenchuk Hydroelectric Power Plant (Ukrainian: Кременчуцька ГЕС, romanized: Kremechutska HES) is a run-of-river power plant on the Dnieper River just upstream of Kremenchuk in Svitlovodsk, Ukraine. The primary purpose of the dam is hydroelectric power generation and navigation. It is the third dam in the Dnieper cascade and creates the largest reservoir on the river. The dam has an associated lock and a power station with an installed capacity of 624 megawatts (837,000 hp). It is operated by Ukrhydroenergo.

== History ==
Construction on the dam began in May 1954, the reservoir began to fill in October 1959, the last generator was commissioned in 1960 and the dam and power plant were inaugurated in 1961.

=== Russo-Ukrainian War ===
On the morning of October 31, 2022, Russian forces launched a massive missile strike on critical infrastructure facilities in Ukraine. In particular, a missile hit was recorded on the premises of the Kremenchuk Hydroelectric Power Station. In December 2024, an anti-drones protection project was commissioned for the dam to protect it against Russian attacks.

== See also ==
- Hydroelectricity in Ukraine
