= Kremenchuk Reservoir =

Water reservoir on the Dnieper River in Ukraine

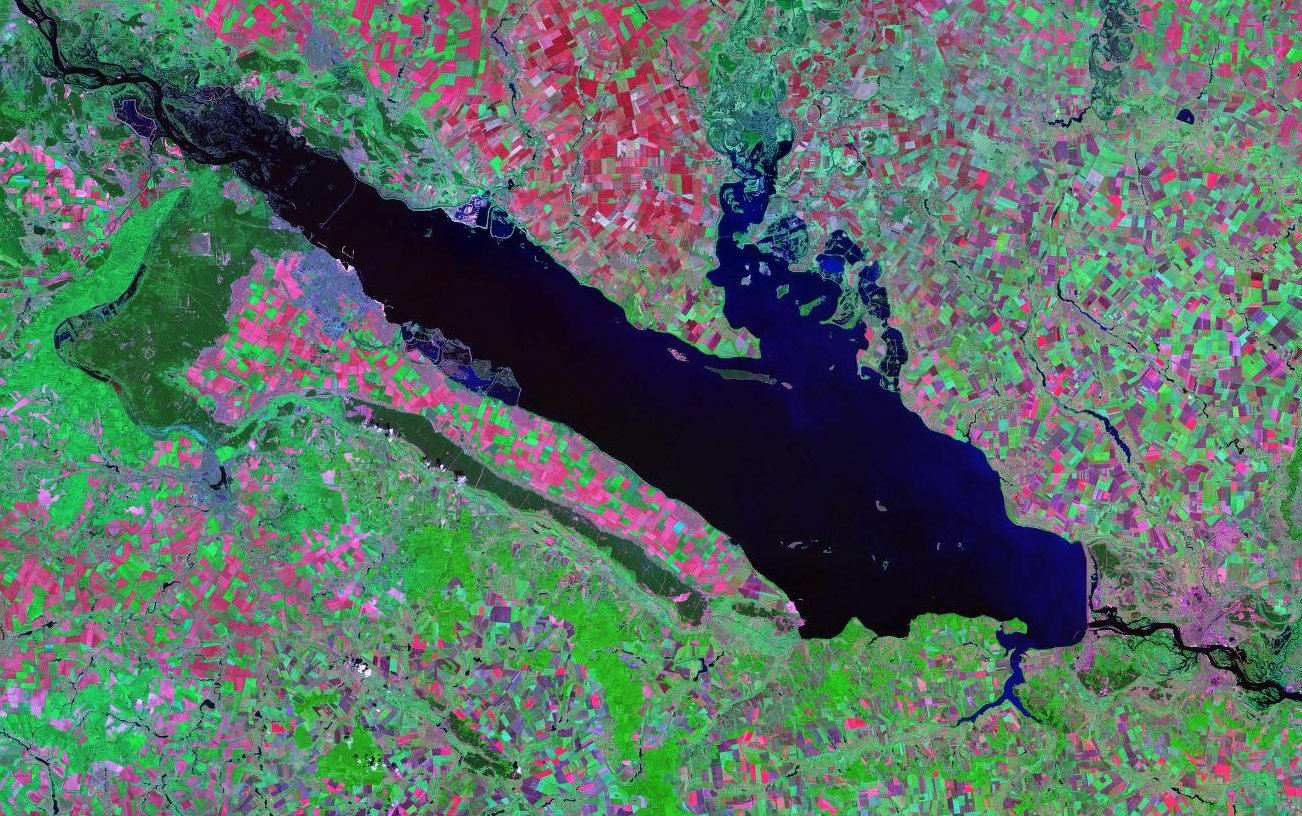

- Location within Poltava Oblast Location within Ukraine
- Interactive map of Kremenchuk Reservoir
- Location: Poltava, Cherkasy, and Kirovohrad Oblasts, Ukraine
- Coordinates: 49°16′N 32°38′E
- Type: Hydroelectric reservoir
- Primary inflows: Dnieper River
- Primary outflows: Dnieper River
- Basin countries: Russia, Belarus, and Ukraine
- Max. length: 149 km (93 mi)
- Max. width: 28 km (17 mi)
- Surface area: 2,250 km^{2} (870 sq mi)
- Water volume: 13.5 km^{3} (10,900,000 acre⋅ft)
- Surface elevation: 77 m (253 ft)
- Islands: numerous
- Settlements: Kaniv, Cherkasy, Chyhyryn, Svitlovodsk

The Kremenchuk Reservoir (Ukrainian: Кременчуцьке водосховище, romanized: Kremenchutske vodoskhovyshche) is a reservoir on the Dnieper river in the Ukrainian oblasts of Poltava, Cherkasy, and Kirovohrad, one of five of Dnieper reservoir cascade. Named after the city of Kremenchuk, the reservoir is primarily used for irrigation, flood control, fishing, and transport from the ports of Cherkasy and Svitlovodsk. It is the largest reservoir on the Dnieper river, with a length of 149 km, a width of 28 km, an area of 2,250 km^{2}, an average depth of six meters, and a volume of 13.5 km^{3}.

The reservoir's water level is maintained by the dam of the Kremenchuk Hydroelectric Power Plant, built between 1954 and 1959. Its filling resulted in the submersion of 23 populated places in the Novoheorhiivsk Raion, including Kryliv and Novoheorhiivsk. The Sula River flows into the reservoir, forming a delta with numerous islands.

== See also ==
- Threat of the Dnieper reservoirs
