= List of power stations in Ukraine =

Location of major power stations in Ukraine: nuclear, coal, hydroelectric

The following page lists power stations in Ukraine.

== Nuclear ==
=== In service ===
Name	Location	Coordinates	Type	Capacity (MWe)	Commissioned	Notes	Refs
Khmelnytskyi	Netishyn	50.302512°N 26.647875°E	VVER	2000	1987, 2004		
Rivne	Varash	51.326857°N 25.890634°E	VVER	2819	1980-2004		
South Ukraine	Pivdennoukrainsk	47.812031°N 31.217372°E	VVER	3000	1982, 1985, 1989		
Zaporizhzhia	Enerhodar	47.508519°N 34.584392°E	VVER	6000	1984-1995	The largest nuclear power plant in Europe. Under Russian occupation. Currently deactived.	

=== Historic ===
Name	Location	Coordinates	Type	Capacity, MWe	Operational	Notes	Refs
Chernobyl Unit 1	Pripyat	51.389445°N 30.10682°E	RBMK	1000	1977–1996		
Chernobyl Unit 2	Pripyat	51.389445°N 30.104406°E	RBMK	1000	1978–1991		
Chernobyl Unit 3	Pripyat	51.389586°N 30.100436°E	RBMK	1000	1981–2000		
Chernobyl Unit 4	Pripyat	51.389606°N 30.09902°E	RBMK	1000	1983–1986	Exploded in the Chernobyl accident	
Chernobyl Unit 5	Pripyat		RBMK	1000	Never	~75% complete. Work stopped ~1989.	
Chernobyl Unit 6	Pripyat		RBMK	1000	Never	Building foundation & floor laid. Work stopped ~1989.	
Crimea	Shcholkine	45.391937°N 35.803727°E	VVER	1000	Never	Remains unfinished. Commenced 1975. Unit 1 80% complete and Unit 2 18% finished in 1989.	
Chyhyryn	Chyhyryn	49.08472°N 32.78528°E	VVER	1000	Never	Never finished since 1977 and stopped in 1989	
Odesa	Teplodar	46.46056°N 30.31611°E	VVER	1000	Never	Never finished since 1980 and stopped in 1986	
Kharkiv	Birky	49°41′17.7″N 36°04′06.4″E	VVER	1000	Never	Never finished since 1986 and stopped in 1990	

== Hydroelectric ==
Name	Location	Coordinates	Power (MW)	Year built (Note: The year construction started and the year the first energy unit was completed.)	Date of destruction	Refs
~~Dnieper Hydroelectric Station~~	Zaporizhzhia	47.869444°N 35.086111°E	1,578.6	1927–1932, finished in 1939 (destroyed in 1941 by the retreating Soviet Armed Forces to prevent its capture by Nazi Germany) Rebuilt 1944–1950 Expanded 1969–1972, finished in 1980	22 March 2024, according to the Governor of Zaporizhzhia Oblast, "The energy component is not working and will not be able to work"	
Dniester Hydroelectric Power Plant	Novodnistrovsk	48.59391°N 27.452903°E	702	1973–1981	Was attacked in 2024, but continued to operate	
Dniester Pumped Storage Power Station	Novodnistrovsk	48.514387°N 27.47436°E	1,296	1983–2009		
Kyiv Hydroelectric Power Plant	Vyshhorod	50.588305°N 30.51178°E	440	1960–1964	Was attacked in 2024, but continued to operate.	
Kyiv Pumped Storage Power Plant	Vyshhorod	50.608333°N 30.485333°E	235.5	1963–1970		
Kaniv Hydroelectric Station	Kaniv	49.766528°N 31.471722°E	444	1964–1972	Was attacked in 2024, but continued to operate.	
Kaniv Pumped Storage Power Station	Buchak, Kaniv	49°51′07″N 31°27′02″E	1,000	1986–1991; 2019– (allegedly under construction, no progress as of 2024)		
Kremenchuk Hydroelectric Station	Svitlovodsk	49.075°N 33.251°E	700	1954–1959		
~~Kakhovka Hydroelectric Station~~	Nova Kakhovka	46.776111°N 33.371667°E	335	1950–1956	6 June 2023	
Middle Dnieper Hydroelectric Power Plant	Kamianske	48.548504°N 34.541016°E	388	1956–1963		
Tashlyk Pumped-Storage Power Plant	Pivdennoukrainsk	47.7968399°N 31.1806154°E	302	1981–2007		

== Thermal ==
=== State Regional Power Plants (GRES/DRES/SDPP) ===
Name	Location	Coordinates	Capacity, MWe	Units	Fuel	Adm. company	Date of destruction
Burshtyn thermal power plant	Burshtyn	49.209579°N 24.662762°E	2,334	12x200	coal	Zakhidenergo	March 29, 2024
Dobrotvir thermal power plant	Dobrotvir	50.213273°N 24.374971°E	600	3x100+2x150	coal	Zakhidenergo	
Kryvyi Rih thermal power plant	Zelenodolsk	47.539222°N 33.661852°E	2,820	10x282	coal	Dniproenergo	
Kurakhove thermal power plant	Kurakhove	47.994402°N 37.240219°E	1,482	7x200	coal	DTEK Skhidenergo	October 17, 2022. Dismantled in 2024 for spares. Under control of Russia since early January 2025.
Ladyzhyn thermal power plant	Ladyzhyn	48.706709°N 29.2202°E	1,800	6x300	coal	Zakhidenergo	March 22, 2024
Lokachi thermal power plant	Lokachi	50°44′31″N 24°44′31″E	10	2x5	natural gas	Naftogaz Ukrainy	
Luhansk thermal power plant	Shchastia	48.747814°N 39.262389°E	1,500	1x100+7x200	coal	DTEK Skhidenergo	Under Russian occupation
Myronivsky power plant	Myronivskyi	48.480816°N 38.289821°E	100	0	coal	DTEK Donetskoblenergo	Under Russian occupation
Dnieper thermal power plant	Dnipro	48.405278°N 35.113889°E	1,765	4x150+4x300	coal	Dniproenergo	
Sievierodonetsk Power Station	Sievierodonetsk	48.9375°N 38.452778°E	150	1	coal	Ministry of Energy and Coal of Ukraine	Under Russian occupation
Shteriv thermal power plant	Miusynsk	48.090751°N 38.880336°E	dismantled	0	coal	N/A	
Sloviansk Thermal Power Plant	Mykolaivka	48.872054°N 37.765675°E	800	1x800	coal	Donbasenergo	
Starobeshivska thermal power plant	Novyi Svit	47.800688°N 38.005657°E	1,785	9x175 + 1x210	coal	Donbasenergo	Under Russian occupation
~~Trypilska thermal power plant~~	Ukrainka, Kyiv Oblast	50.134417°N 30.746806°E	1,800	6x300	coal, natural gas	Centrenergo	April 11, 2024
Vuhlehirska thermal power plant	Svitlodarske, Donetsk Oblast	48.465278°N 38.205°E	3,600	4x300+3x800	coal, natural gas	Centrenergo	Under Russian occupation
Zaporizhzhia thermal power station	Enerhodar	47.509491°N 34.624443°E	2,850	2x300+2x325+2x800	coal, natural gas	Dniproenergo	Under Russian occupation
~~Zmiivska thermal power plant~~	Slobozhanske	49.5874°N 36.530657°E	2,200	5x200+4x300	coal	Centrenergo	March 22, 2024
Zuivska power station	Zuhres	48.033101°N 38.286152°E	1,220	3x300 + 1x320	coal, natural gas	DTEK Skhidenergo	Under Russian occupation

=== Combined heat and power plants (TEC/CHP) ===
Name	Location	Capacity	Fuel	Operator	Commissioned	Closed	Notes
Kryvyi Rih TEC-3	Dnipropetrovsk Oblast	274	natural gas	ArcelorMittal	1974		
Bilotserkivska	Kyiv Oblast	120	oil, natural gas		1971		
Cherkasy	Cherkasy Oblast	200	coal		1961		
Chernihiv	Chernihiv Oblast	210	coal		1964		
Dnipro	Dnipropetrovsk Oblast	246.4	natural gas		1932		
Kalush	Ivano-Frankivsk Oblast	200	coal	Ukrinterenergo	1967		
Kharkiv TEC-2 (Eshkar)	Kharkiv Oblast	150	coal		1930		
Kharkiv TEC-5	Kharkiv Oblast	540	natural gas		1979		
~~Kherson~~	Kherson Oblast	80	natural gas		1958	August 27, 2026	
~~Kremenchuk~~	Poltava Oblast	255	natural gas	Poltavaoblenergo	1965	April 24, 2022	
Kyiv TEC-4 (Darnytska)	Kyiv	160	coal	Euro-Reconstruction	1954		
Kyiv TEC-5	Kyiv	700	natural gas	Kyivteploenergo	1971		
Kyiv TEC-6	Kyiv	500	natural gas	Kyivteploenergo	1981		
Lviv TEC-1	Lviv Oblast	68	natural gas	Lvivteploenergo	1908		
Mykolaiv	Mykolaiv Oblast	40	natural gas		1902		
Odesa	Odesa Oblast	68	natural gas		1950		
~~Okhtyrka~~	Sumy Oblast	12.75	natural gas	BrokEnergia	1959	March 3, 2022	
Shostka	Sumy Oblast	115	natural gas	Kharkivenergoremont	1962		
~~Severodonetsk~~	Luhansk Oblast	260	natural gas		1952	June 29, 2022	
Sumy	Sumy Oblast	40	coal	Sumiteploenergo	1957		
Zuhres	Donetsk Oblast	12	natural gas		1932		Under Russian control

== Solar ==
Name	Location	Coordinates	MW
Okhotnykovo Solar Park (Crimea)	Okhotnykove	45°17′13″N 33°35′52″E	82.65
Perovo Solar Park (Crimea)	Kliuchi	44°57′28″N 33°55′37″E	100
Starokozache Solar Park (Odesa Oblast)	Starokozache	46°20′42″N 30°00′10″E	42.95
Nikopol Solar Park	Starozavodske	47°39′59″N 34°16′30″E	246
Danube/Dunayskaya Solar Park	Artsyz	45°59′00″N 29°27′50″E	43.14
Mityaevo Solar Park (Crimea)	Mytiaieve	45°14′14″N 33°40′28″E	31.55
Limanskaya Solar Park	Reni	45°28′08″N 28°14′52″E	43.4
Tryfonivka Solar Park	Tryfonivka	46°41′31″N 32°37′28″E	10
Solar Chornobyl	Pripyat	51°23′32″N 30°05′58″E ?	100
Pokrovske Solar Park	Pokrovske	47°39′31″N 34°08′58″E	240
Kamianets-Podilskyi Solar Park	Kamianets-Podilskyi	48°38′00″N 26°37′50″E	63

== Wind ==
- Botievska wind power plant - 200 MWp
- Zaporizhzhia wind power plant - 500 MWp
- Kramatorsk wind farm - 67,5 MWp
- Prymorska wind farm - 200 MWp
- Tylihul Wind Power Plant - 565 MWp
- Novoazovska wind farm - 107,5 MWp
- Krasnodon Wind Farm - 25 MWp
- Syvash wind farm - 246 MWp
- Orlivska Wind Power Plant - 100 MWp
- Dnistrovska Wind Power Plant - 100 MWp

== See also ==
- List of power stations in Europe
- List of largest power stations in the world
- DTEK
- Energy Company of Ukraine
