= Myronivka (disambiguation) =

Myronivka (Ukrainian: Миронівка) is a city in Obukhiv Raion, Kyiv Oblast, Ukraine. It may also refer to the following:

== Places ==
=== Ukraine ===
- Myronivka, Bilohirsk Raion, Crimea
- Myronivka, Qurman Raion, Crimea
- Myronivka, Donetsk Oblast
- Myronivka, Vinnytsia Oblast
- Myronivka, Nikopol Raion, Dnipropetrovsk
- Myronivka, Kamianske Raion, Dnipropetrovsk
- Myronivka, Zaporizhzhia
- Myronivka, Kropyvnytskyi Raion, Kirovohrad
- Myronivka, Oleksandriia Raion, Kirovohrad
- Myronivka, Poltava
- Myronivka, Sumy
- Myronivka, Bohodukhiv Raion, Kharkiv
- Myronivka, Biliaivka rural hromada, Lozova Raion, Kharkiv
- Myronivka, Lozova urban hromada, Lozova Raion, Kharkiv

=== Russia ===
- Mironovka, Altai Krai

== Other ==
- Myronivka Raion, a former raion in Kyiv Oblast
- Myronivka urban hromada, a hromada in Obukhiv Raion, Kyiv Oblast
- FC Nyva Myronivka, a former Ukrainian football club from Myronivka, Kyiv Oblast
- Myronivka railway station, a railway station in Myronivka, Kyiv Oblast

== See also ==
- Myronivsky Power Station, a coal-fired power station near Debaltseve, Donetsk Oblast
- Myronivskyi, a rural settlement in Bakhmut Raion, Donetsk Oblast
- PrJSC MHP, formerly called Myronivsky Hliboproduct, an international food and agrotech company headquartered in Kyiv
- Myronides, an Athenian general of the First Peloponnesian War
