= Kurakhove Power Station =

Power station in Donetsk Oblast, Ukraine

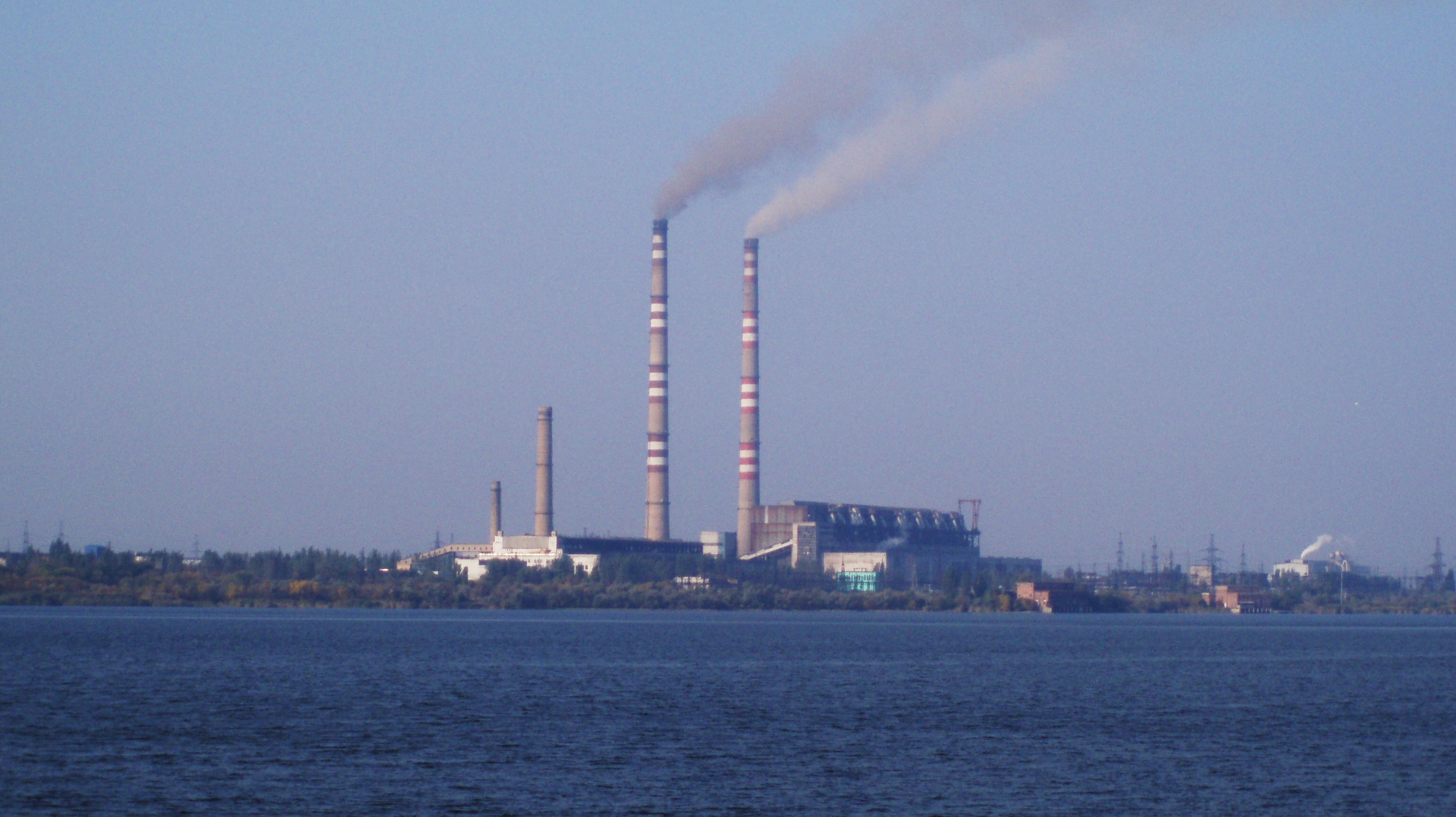
- Country: Ukraine
- Location: Kurakhove
- Coordinates: 47°59′43.57″N 37°14′13.67″E
- Status: Decommissioned
- Construction began: 1936
- Commission date: 1941
- Decommission date: 2024
- Owner: DTEK (SCM Holdings)
- Operator: DTEK
- Employees: 1700 (2015)

Thermal power station
- Primary fuel: Natural gas
- Secondary fuel: Coal

Power generation
- Units operational: 1 x 200 MW; 1 x 210 MW; 1 x 222 MW; 4 x 225 MW
- Make and model: TAGMET; LMZ; Electrotyazhmash
- Nameplate capacity: 1,532 MW (2015)

External links
- Commons: Related media on Commons

Kurakhove Power Station (Ukrainian: Курахівська ТЕС, romanized: Kurakhivska TES) was a thermal power plant on Volycha river 15 kilometres (9.3 mi) from Kurakhove in Donetsk Oblast, Ukraine. By November 2024, it was decommissioned and largely destroyed by Russian forces during the Battle of Kurakhove. By early January 2025, the power plant was captured by Russia.

== History ==
=== Construction in the Soviet Union ===
During the first five-year plan, the Soviet government adopted a resolution to build a new power plant in the Donbas, in the south of Krasnoarmiiskyi (now Pokrovsk Raion). It was supposed to significantly replenish the capacities of two power systems of the southern European part of the USSR - Donenergo and Prydniprovenergo - and become a link between Donbas and Dnipro, the two largest industrial centres of southern Ukraine (then the Ukrainian SSR).

In 1933, "Donenergo" identified, and on 15 August 1934, "Golovenergo" of the USSR People's Commissariat for Heavy Industry approved, the site for future construction on the Vovcha River, 15 km from the village of Kurakhivka. This is where the name of the Thermal Power Plant (TPP) comes from.

Construction began in the summer of 1936. The head of "Kurakhivdresbud" was V. Sokolovsky.

At the beginning of 1937, the construction of the Kurakhove power plant was temporarily suspended, and specialists and skilled workers were sent to complete the construction of the second stage of the Zuivska TPP. On 20 December 1937, the Government of the USSR passed a resolution to complete the construction of the first stage of the Kurakhivska GRES in the second half of 1939 and to commission two turbines with a capacity of about 50 thousand kW each.

In April 1938, 450 workers from Chernihiv, Voronezh and other regions arrived at the construction site in an organized manner. The team of builders was also replenished by the local population. In August 1938, 2147 people worked here.

In 1941, the first power unit was put into operation, which produced electricity on 6 July 1941.

=== Second World War and reconstruction ===
During World War II, Kurakhove's DRES became a strategic target. When Nazi forces advanced toward Donetsk, a number of residents and plant workers organized defense efforts. The plant continued to supply electricity while simultaneously preparing for evacuation. Equipment that could not be evacuated was rendered inoperable to prevent its use by the Nazis. On October 20, 1941, Nazi forces captured Kurakhove, and many local residents who could not evacuate engaged in resistance efforts against occupation, including sabotage and support for partisan groups.

Kurakhove was retaken by Soviet forces on September 9, 1943. However, the retreating Nazis left the town in ruins, destroying much of its infrastructure, including the power plant. Reconstruction efforts began immediately after the town’s liberation.

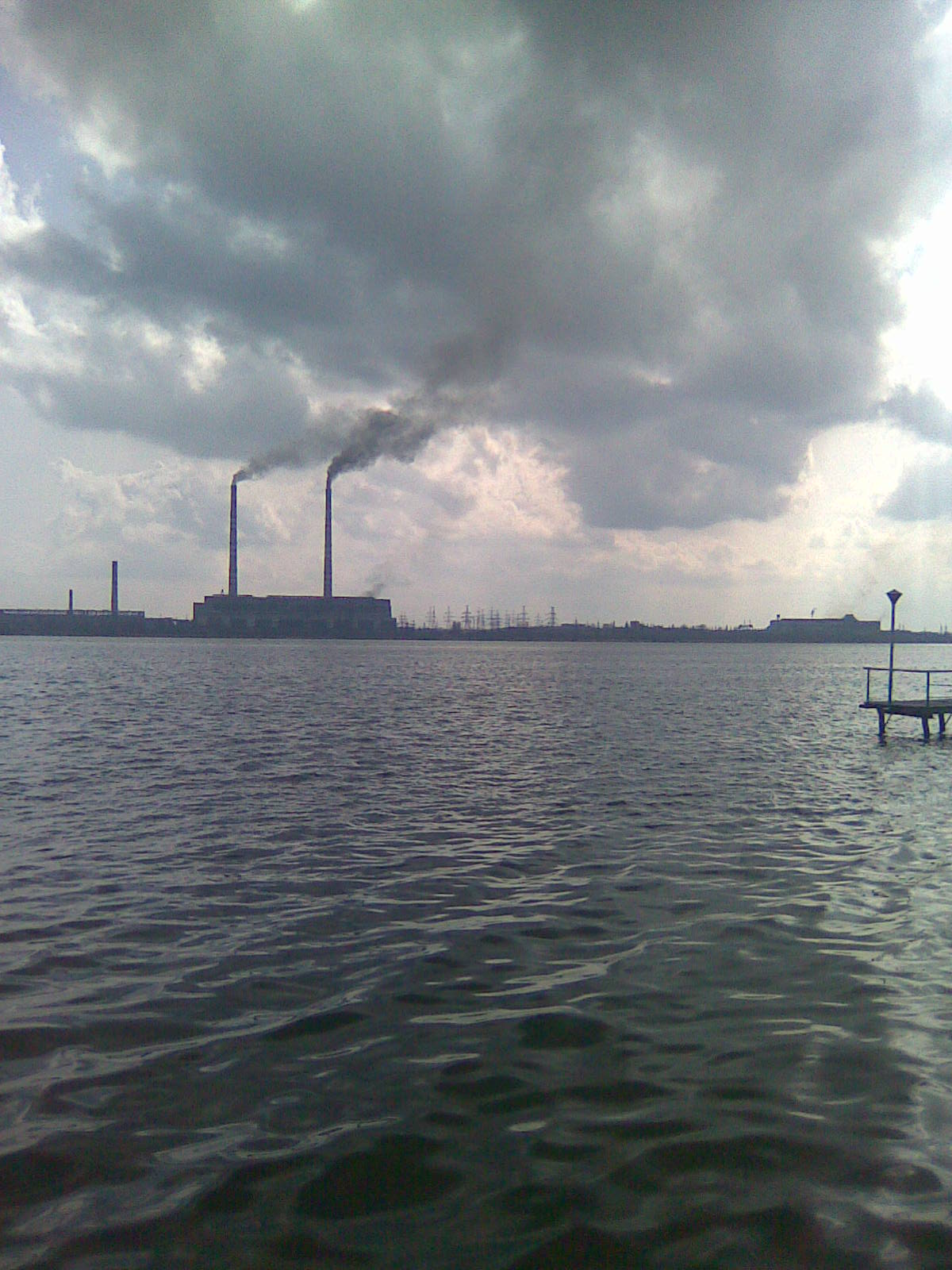
View of the Kurakhovo TPP from the northern shore of the Kurakhove Reservoir

On 17 August 1943, after Kurakhove was re-taken by Soviet forces, the State Defence Committee Union of Soviet Socialist Republics of the USSR issued a resolution obliging party, Soviet and economic bodies to start work on the preparation and restoration of the Kurakhove thermal power plant. At the same time, the housing stock was being rebuilt. By 1946, the power plant was operational again, with a production capacity of 100,000 kW, double its pre-war capacity.

In 1946, the TPP produced its first electricity - on 15 August, the first stage of the rebuilt Kurakhove power plant with a capacity of 50 thousand kW was put into operation, and in 1947, the second turbine with a capacity of 54 thousand kW was commissioned. In December 1952, the last turbine generator envisaged by the project was commissioned.

=== Post-war operation and expansion ===
Between 1969 and 1975, the power station was largely reconstructed. One unit with a capacity of 200 MW and six units with a capacity of 210 MW each were installed, all coal-fired. By 1975, with the commissioning of the seventh turbine, the station's capacity increased to 1,460 MW.

During the expansion of the Kurakhivska TPP territory, 18 nomadic burials of the 12th century were excavated in the ‘Great Grave’ mound in 1969, in which chainmail, a dagger, a saber, and a quiver with arrows were found. In one burial, the skeleton of a horse with harness was found.

In 1990, the station's capacity reached 1,470 MW.

The Kurakhove Thermal Power Plant was among the first in the Soviet Union to operate with high-pressure steam parameters. It introduced several innovations, including the first hydrogen-cooled generators, powerful air circuit breakers, and other technical advancements.

On April 28, 2001, the power plant (previously managed by the "Donbassenergo" generating company) was sold at auction and became an independent division of DTEK Vostokenergo, a subsidiary of the DTEK corporation, which in turn is owned by System Capital Management.

On July 28, 2003, the Kurakhove TPP was included in the list of critical energy infrastructure in Ukraine, with its security entrusted to a departmental paramilitary guard in cooperation with specialized units of the Ministry of Internal Affairs of Ukraine and other central executive authorities.

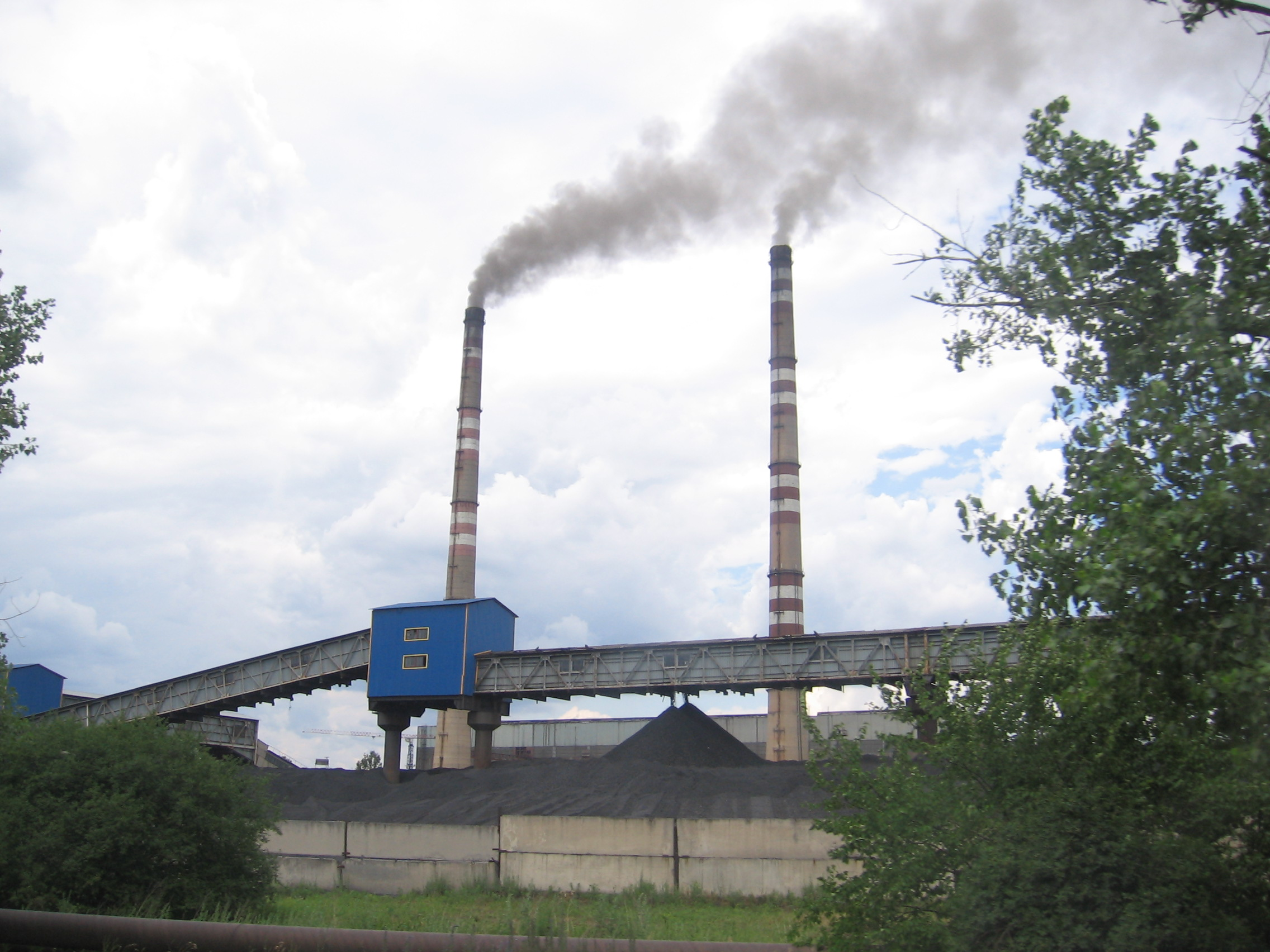
View of the Kurakhove TPP from the H15 highway (Donetsk — Zaporizhzhia)

Since 2007, DTEK Corporation has been reconstructing existing power units in order to increase capacity and improve the reliability of equipment.

After the decommissioning of the outdated equipment of the first stage, the power plant's capacity as of 2008 was 1460 MW (1 unit with a capacity of 200 MW and 6 units with 210 MW).

- January 2009 — Reconstruction of Unit 5 was completed
- January 2010 — modernization of Unit 7 was completed
- January 2012 — modernization of Unit 8 was completed
- January 2013 — modernization of Unit 6 was completed
- January 2015 — modernization of Unit 9 was completed

The modernization increased the capacity of the power units from 210 to 225 MW (222 MW for Unit 5, 220 MW for Unit 8), expanded the range of maneuverability from 80 to 120 MW, increased the efficiency of the power units by 12%, and significantly improved environmental performance — increasing the total capacity by 72 MW.

In February 2022, only five units were operating, ahead of the planned connection of the Ukrainian energy system to the European system ENTSO-E. One more unit was being kept as reserve, and one more under repair.

=== Russo-Ukrainian War and decommissioning ===
On 17 October 2022, in the morning, the Russian forces launched a series of missile strikes on Ukraine's energy infrastructure, including the Kurakhove TPP. The massive attack continued the next day, on 18 October. In particular, energy facilities in Zhytomyr, Dnipro and Kyiv were hit.

In February 2023, the State Bureau of Investigation of Ukraine prevented a terrorist plot by a collaborating ex-law enforcement officer from Donetsk Oblast, who planned to carry out sabotage at the plant by detonating explosive devices and ammunition with an accomplice.

The plant was shut down in April 2023 following shelling. As a result of the attack, the plant's equipment was damaged, as a result of which the plant stopped producing electricity. The units were therefore regarded as mothballed as of June 2023.

In July 2023, it was reported that one unit has been restored and started working. Around the same time, on 7 July 2023, the roof of the TPP's boiler and turbine shop collapsed. During the debris removal, three dead workers and three people injured with varying degrees of severity were found.

The plant again was shelled several times in December 2023, with further damage. 5 people received injuries. This was the tenth attack on this thermal power plant.

According to the plant director, Anatoliy Borichevskiy, the plant was shelled 38 times between 5 December 2023 and 17 January 2024, nearly every day. He further stated that the Russians would start shelling every time they saw smoke rising from the chimneys. Workers in the command center had to stay at their posts even during shelling.

Due to the heavy shelling by Russian forces, the power plant was rendered entirely inoperable in March 2024, as the railway bridge for coal transport was destroyed. In a following meeting by the power plant management, it was decided to disassemble the plant to supply other attacked power plants. The supplies contributed to the restoration of more than 60% of the country's energy capacity. Many employees evacuated in the following months, with about 100 workers remaining in the facility until November.

After the evacuation, Russian forces continued shelling of the plant site during the Battle of Kurakhove in late November, damaging two cooling towers. According to the Ukrainian journalist Denys Kazanskyi, the plant was completely destroyed in the final days of November, destroying all main buildings and pipes.

== Unit details ==
Unit name	Status	Fuel(s)	Capacity (MW)	Technology	Start year
Unit 3	mothballed	coal: subbituminous	200	supercritical	1972
Unit 4	mothballed	coal: subbituminous	210	supercritical	1973
Unit 5	mothballed	coal: subbituminous	222	supercritical	1973
Unit 6	mothballed	coal: subbituminous	225	supercritical	1973
Unit 7	mothballed	coal: subbituminous	225	supercritical	1974
Unit 8	mothballed	coal: subbituminous	225	supercritical	1974
Unit 9	mothballed	coal: subbituminous	225	supercritical	1975

== Management ==
- Ivan Zapolsky (November 2007 to July 2010)
- Victor Ruppa (July 2010 to 2013)
- Anatoliy Borychevskyi (November 2013 to January 2019)
- Stanislav Valantir (since February 2019)
- Anatoliy Borychevskyi (as of 2024)

== Gallery ==
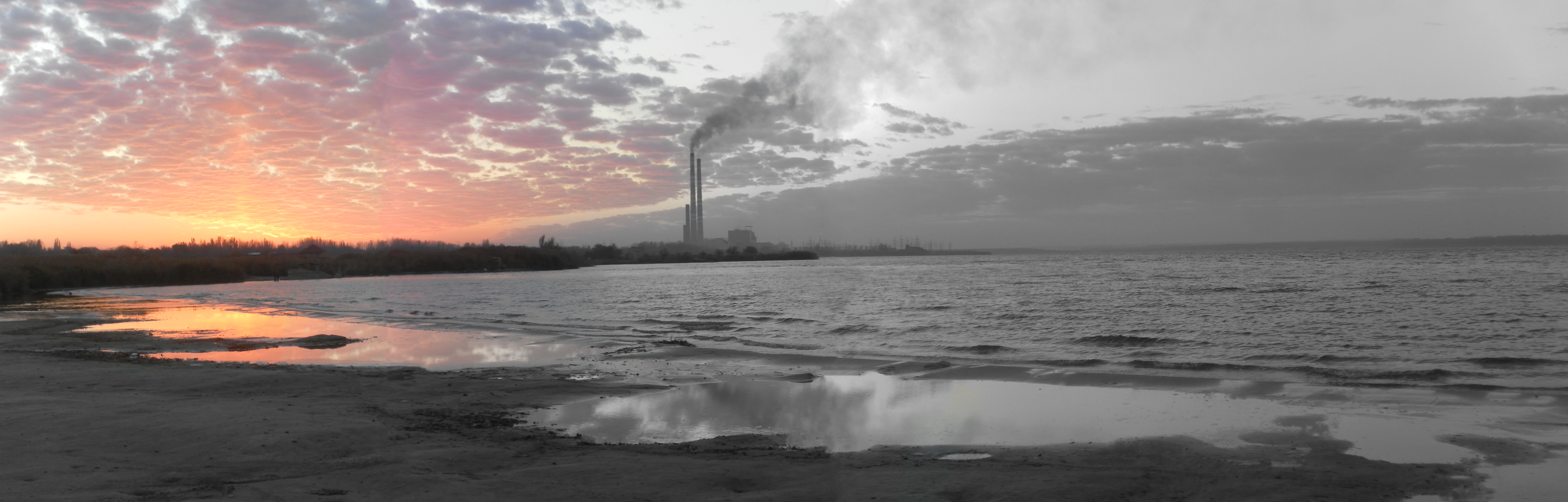
Panorama of plant and Kurakhove Reservoir

== See also ==
- List of power stations in Ukraine
