= Hydroelectricity in Ukraine =

Hydropower is part of renewable energy in Ukraine. Ukraine is trying to build more small hydroelectric plants as sources of electricity in Ukraine. State operating company is Ukrhydroenergo. About half of hydro capacity of power stations in Ukraine has been destroyed in the Russian invasion of Ukraine, including the Kakhovka Hydroelectric Power Plant. Defence against drones is important. Design of main power plants is carried out by Ukrhydroproject.

== General characteristics ==
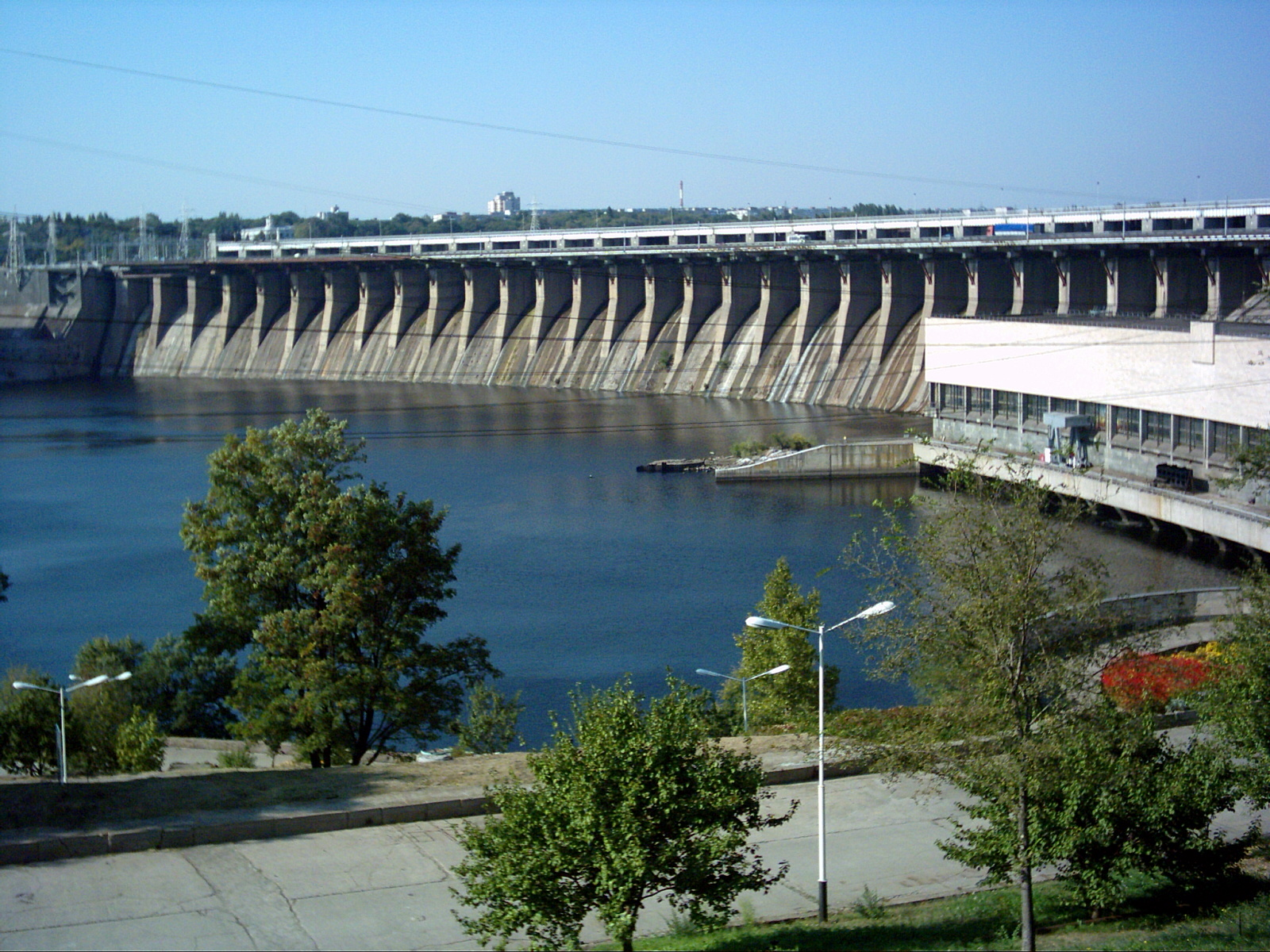
Dnieper Hydroelectric Station in Zaporizhzhia Oblast

The main cascades of hydroelectric power stations are the Dnipro cascade and the Dniester HPP cascade. Ukrhydroenergo is seeking more financing for the Kaniv Pumped Storage Power Station.

About half of hydro capacity has been destroyed by the war. In the energy sector of Ukraine, hydroelectric power plants occupy the third place after fossil fuels (coal and natural gas) and atomic energy. The total installed capacity of the Ukrainian hydroelectric power stations is currently 8% of the total capacity of the combined energy system of the country. The average annual output of electric power by hydroelectric power stations is 10.8 billion kWh. The economic and technical potential of the hydropower resources of Ukraine comprises about 20 billion kWh, and as of 2019 no more than 50% is used. The main used potential is concentrated on the hydroelectric power stations of the Dnipro cascade (capacity - 3.8 GW, output - 9.9 GWh • h): Dnieper Hydroelectric Station, Kyiv Pumped Storage Power Plant (HPSP), Tashlyk HPSP.

In addition to hydroelectric power plants (HPP) and HPS, 49 so-called small hydroelectric plants operate in Ukraine, producing more than 200 million kWh of electricity. But they have drawbacks: rapid wear of equipment, damage to the structures of a pressure fountain, drainage of reservoirs, insufficient use of means of automation and control.

The main cascades of hydroelectric power stations are the Dnipro cascade and the Dniester cascade.

Also there are some unfinished projects on the Southern Bug like Konstiantynivska HPP (430 MW)

Construction has started of the Kaniv Pumped Storage Power Station (1000/1040 MW)

On Tashlyk Pumped-Storage Power Plant, a units 3-6 is under construction.

In 2018 construction started on the second part of the Kakhovka Hydroelectric Power Plant, the Kakhovka-2 Hydroelectric Power Plant (250 MW).

== Development plans ==
The draft action plan for the implementation of the Energy Strategy of Ukraine for the period until 2050, published on the website of the Ministry of Energy on December 11, 2024, plans to study the possibility of building new hydroelectric power plants (HPP) and pumped storage power stations (PSPS):

- Upper Dniester HPP cascade (79.2 MW);
- HPP cascade on the Ukrainian section of the Tysa River (220 MW);
- HPP cascade on the lower section of the Teresva River in the Transcarpathian region (24 MW);
- HPP cascade on the border section of the Tysa River with Romania;
- Transcarpathian PSPS (1200 MW);
- channel HPPs on the Shopurka River in the Transcarpathian region (0.5 MW);
- Zaporizhzhia PSPS based on a granite quarry;
- PSPP in the quarries of the Poltava Mining and Processing Plant.

In 2025, Ukrhydroenergo plans to begin construction of the first hydroelectric power plant in Cherkasy Oblast with protection based on the example of South Korea. Kaniv PSPS will have a capacity of 1,000 MW and cost $1.5–2 billion.

== Largest stations ==
- List of hydroelectric power stations in Ukraine

== Small stations ==
- Small hydropower plants of Ukraine
