= Trypilska thermal power plant =

Power station in Kyiv region, Ukraine

Coordinates: 50°08′06.2″N 30°44′53.2″E

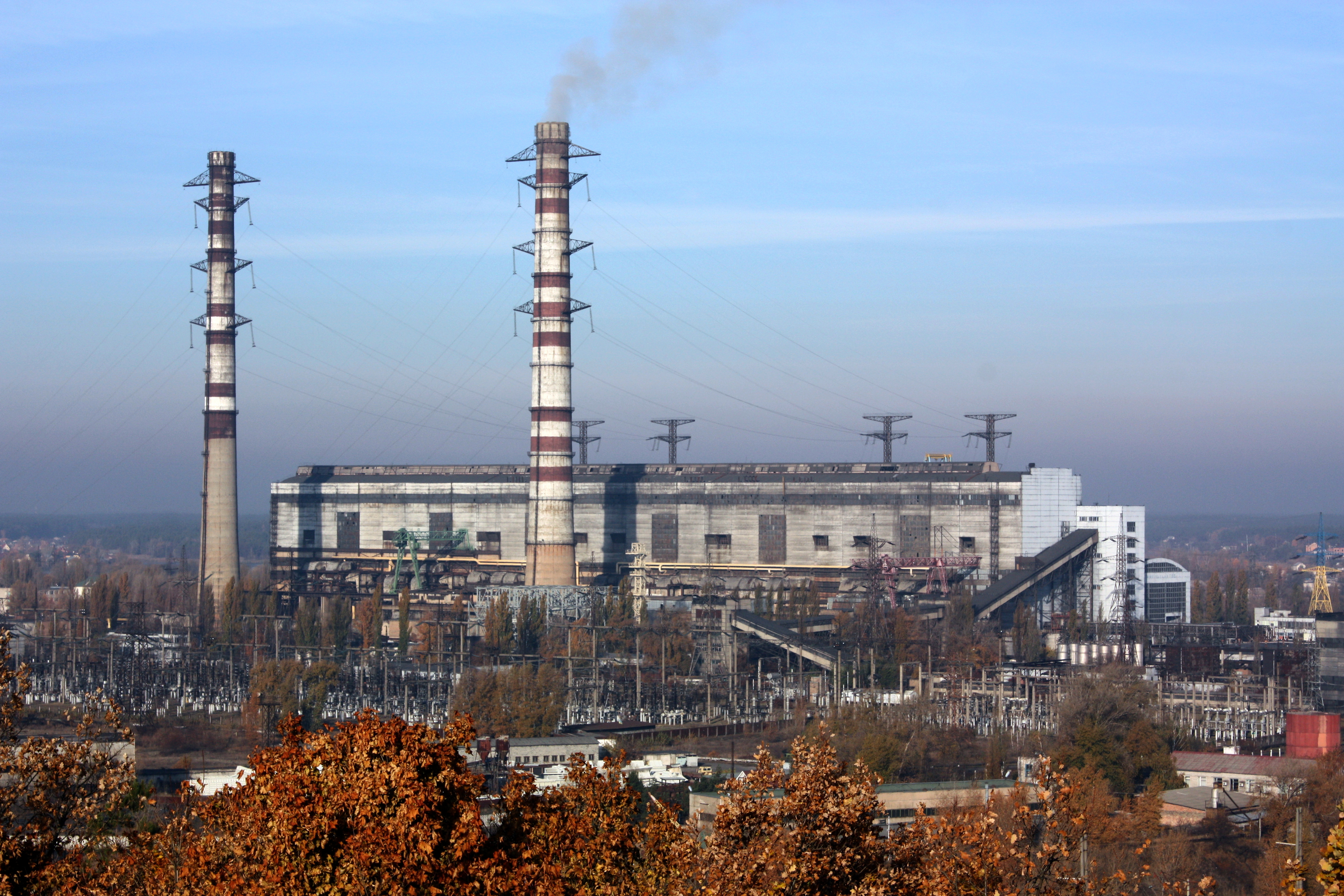
Trypilska TPP in 2015.

Trypilska TPP (Ukrainian: Трипільська ТЕС) was a 1800 MW thermal power station located on the Dnipro river, about 40 km downstream of the city of Kyiv, in Ukraine, built by the Soviet Union in 1969 and completed in 1977.

During the Russian invasion of Ukraine, the station was permanently disabled on 11 April 2024 after Russian missiles set fire to the main turbine hall. It was the largest power plant in the Kyiv Oblast region.

== Operations ==
The main assets of the Trypilska TPP were four pulverized coal and two diesel fuel units with a capacity of 300 MW each. There were also six turbines and generators with a total nominal capacity of 1,800 MW. The transformers are of the TDC-400000/330 type.

The fuel facility consists of an open coal storage with a capacity of 280,000 tons, which was serviced by two portal cranes and bulldozers.

The main fuel was Donetsk anthracite coal, which arrived by rail and river to the station berth.

The station was connected to the gas transport system of Ukraine. Also, the fuel economy had containers for using fuel oil as fuel.

== History ==
Kyiv Oblast is known for being energy-rich. Power-generating enterprises with a total capacity of 3,200 MW are located on its territory, of which the installed capacity of the Trypil TPP is about 57%. Therefore, the energy-generating enterprise is the largest supplier of electricity in Kyiv, Cherkasy and Zhytomyr Oblasts. The enterprise occupies an area of 281.3 hectares. It is located in Obukhiv Raion on the bank of the Kaniv Reservoir.

In January 1962, a Decree of the Council of Ministers of the Ukrainian Soviet Socialist Republic approved the development of a thermal power plant in the Trypilska site. The trusts "Pivdenteploenergomontazh", "Hydroelektromontazh", "Hydromechanization", "Pivdenzahidtransbud" and many others participated in the construction of the station. The first unit was connected to the grid in December 1969 and the plant was completed in 1977.

A great deal of work on the analysis of the project, start-up and adjustment of the equipment was performed by the enterprise "LvivORGRES".

The construction of the power plant was carried out by the progressive current-speed method. This method made it possible to significantly shorten the construction period of the power plant.

=== Russo-Ukrainian War ===
On 11 April 2024, the station was targeted with Shahed drones and Kh-69 missiles, resulting in a massive fire. Subsequently, Ukraine's Centrenergo officially announced the complete destruction of the power plant.

On 16 April 2024, President Zelenskyy said that "eleven missiles were launched towards the Trypillya [thermal power] station, upon which the electricity supply in the Kyiv region depends. We managed to intercept the first seven, but the remaining four hit Trypillya. Why? Because we had zero missiles left. We have exhausted all the missiles that were defending Trypillya". In May 2024, the government allocated over 1.5 billion hryvnias for the restoration of the Trypilska and Zmiivska thermal power plants.

== See also ==
- List of power stations in Ukraine
