= Myronivsky Power Station =

Coal-fired power station in Myronivskyi, Ukraine

Myronivsky power station
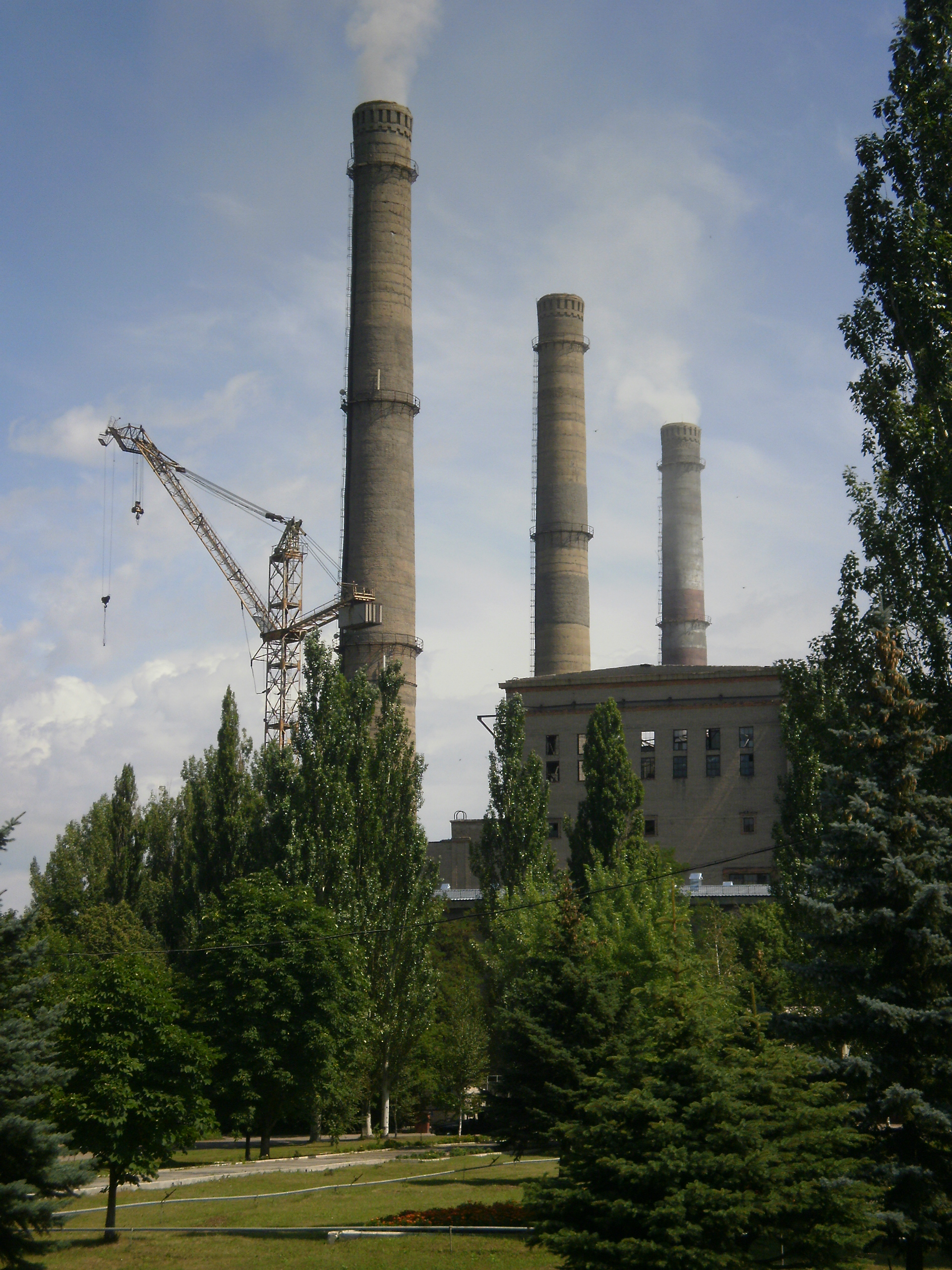
- Myronivsky power station in 2010
- Official name: Миронівська ТЕС
- Country: Ukraine
- Location: Myronivsky, Debaltseve, Donetsk Oblast
- Coordinates: 48°28′50″N 38°17′23″E
- Status: Operational
- Commission date: 1953
- Owner: Donetskoblenergo

Thermal power station
- Primary fuel: Coal

Power generation
- Nameplate capacity: 100 MW

Myronivsky power station (also known as Mironivskaya TEC, Ukrainian: Миронівська ТЕС) is a coal-fired power station at the urban-type settlement of Myronivskyi close to Debaltseve, Ukraine.

== History ==
It was built in 1953 and has an installed capacity of 100 MW.

Two months later, a second 100 MW turbine unit and boiler No. 3 were put into operation.

In 1957, the last, fifth unit with a capacity of 100 MW was commissioned.

In 1995, the state-owned joint-stock energy supply company Donetskoblenergo was established (since 1998 - OJSC DTEK Donetskoblenergo), which retained control of the TPP.

On July 28, 2003, the Myronivka TEC was included in the list of especially important objects of the Ukrainian power industry, the protection of which was entrusted to the departmental militarized security in cooperation with specialized units of the Ministry of Internal Affairs of Ukraine and other central executive bodies.

== See also ==
- List of power stations in Ukraine
