= Kaniv Pumped Storage Power Station =

Kaniv Hydroelectric Pumped Storage Power Plant
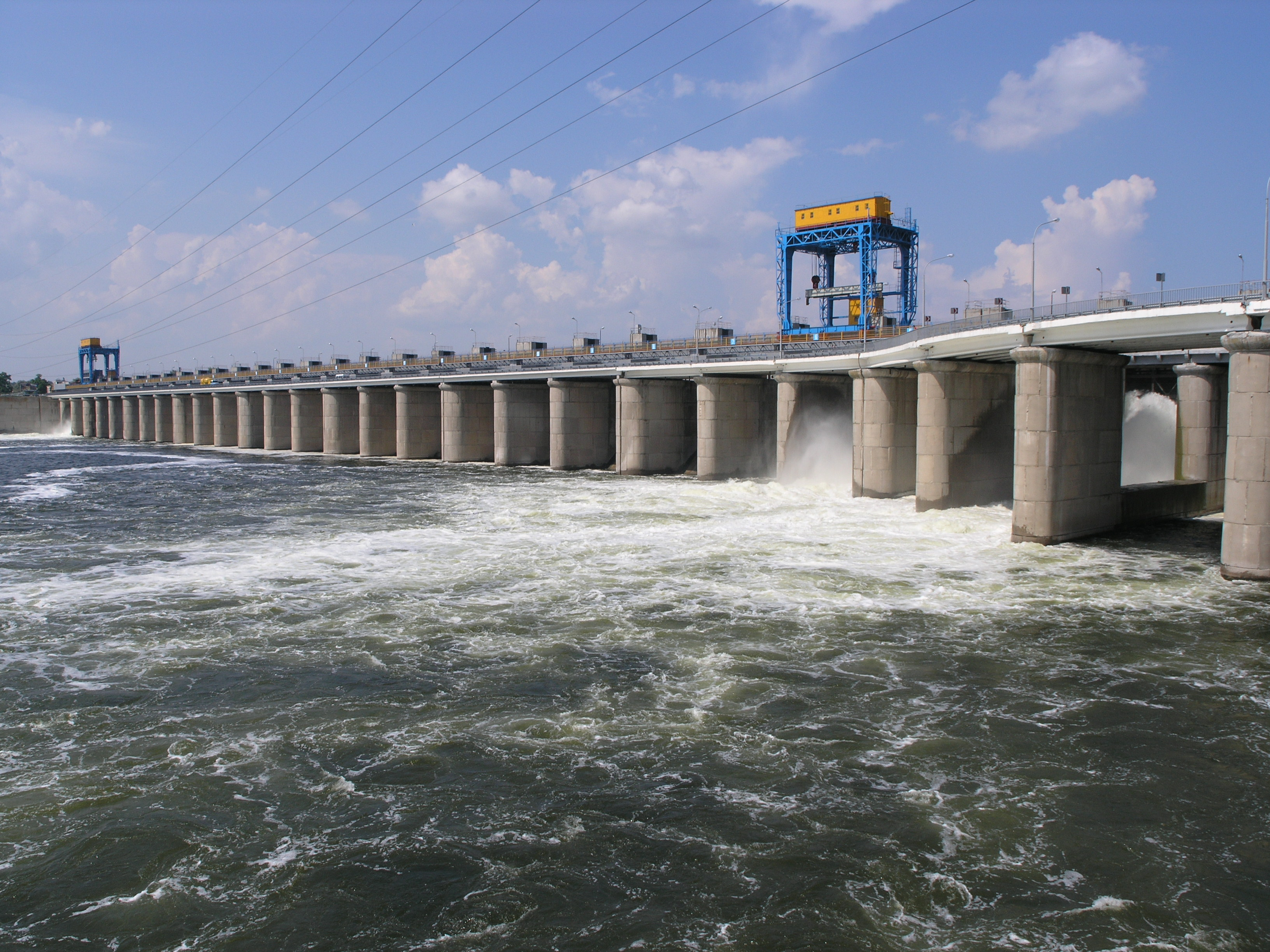
- Interactive map of Kaniv Hydroelectric Pumped Storage Power Plant
- Country: Ukraine
- Location: Buchak, near Kaniv, Cherkasy Oblast
- Purpose: Power
- Status: Under construction
- Construction began: 1986
- Construction cost: 12 billion hryvnias
- Owner: Ukrhydroenergo

Dam and spillways
- Impounds: Dnieper River

Power Station
- Turbines: 4 x Francis-type reversible turbines
- Installed capacity: 1,000 MW (turbine mode), 1,040 MW (pump mode)
- Annual generation: 995 GWh

Kaniv Pumped Storage Power Station is an unfinished pumped-storage hydroelectric power plant in the village of Buchak near the city of Kaniv in Cherkasy Oblast, Ukraine. Construction of the Kaniv PSP with a capacity of 3600 MW began in 1986 but was halted in 1991. An updated project adapted to the current state of Ukraine's unified energy system envisages the construction of a pumped storage power plant with a reduced capacity of 1000 MW.

== History ==
The project for the construction of the power plant, developed in 1985 by the Kharkiv Institute "Ukrhydroproject", envisaged the construction of a PSP with daily and weekly load regulation of the energy system with a capacity of 3600 thousand kW, consisting of 16 rotating hydro units with capacities of 225 and 250 thousand kW in generator and pump modes, respectively.

Construction work on the PSP began in 1984. A pit for the upper reservoir was excavated, power lines, a concrete road, and a railway were built, 759 thousand cubic meters of sand were deposited, and the banks of the Kaniv Reservoir were partially reinforced. The residents of the village of Buchak, located in the construction zone, were resettled (a total of 85 households). Compensation was paid to the resettled residents. A total of 57 million rubles (at 1984 prices) was spent. Construction was suspended in 1991 during the implementation of emergency measures to stabilize Ukraine's economy. On the initiative of the Dniprohydroenergo, supported by the Ministry of Energy and Coal Industry of Ukraine, the moratorium on the construction of the Kaniv PSP was lifted by the Cabinet of Ministers of Ukraine decree No. 307-р dated April 19, 1999. This created the necessary preconditions for the continuation of construction work.

From 2006 to 2007, PJSC "Ukrhydroproject" (Kharkiv) developed and approved an updated feasibility study for the construction of the Kaniv PSP. According to the decree of the Cabinet of Ministers of Ukraine dated November 8, 2007 No. 965-р, construction of the PSP was planned to resume in 2009. The project, designed for completion by 2015, envisaged the construction of a station with a design installed capacity in turbine mode of 1000 MW, in pump mode - 1120 MW, consisting of four hydro units of the POHT-851 type. In November 2008, public hearings were held in the villages of Pshenichniki and Bobrytsia in Kaniv Raion, Cherkasy Oblast, on the continuation of the construction of the Kaniv PSP, and the construction and operation of the power plant were approved by the local community, as documented in the relevant protocols.

In early July 2011, the Ukrainian hydropower operator PJSC "Ukrhydroenergo" and Sinohydro LLC. (China) signed a memorandum of cooperation for the construction of the Kaniv PSP. In 2013, a new project was approved, with an installed capacity of 1000 MW in turbine mode and 1040 MW in pump mode. The estimated construction period was set at 6.5 years, with a project payback period of 10 years, and a budget of 12 billion hryvnias, of which 70% would be financed by international financial institutions. The project implementation was suspended due to political events but resumed in July 2016 when the Cabinet of Ministers of Ukraine adopted a new hydropower development program, which includes the construction of the Kaniv PSP. In October 2016, Ukrhydroenergo announced a tender for the construction of priority facilities and structures at the PSP.

== See also ==
- Hydroelectricity in Ukraine
- List of power stations in Ukraine
- List of pumped-storage power stations
