= Kurakhove =

City in Donetsk Oblast, Ukraine

Kurakhove Курахове
- City
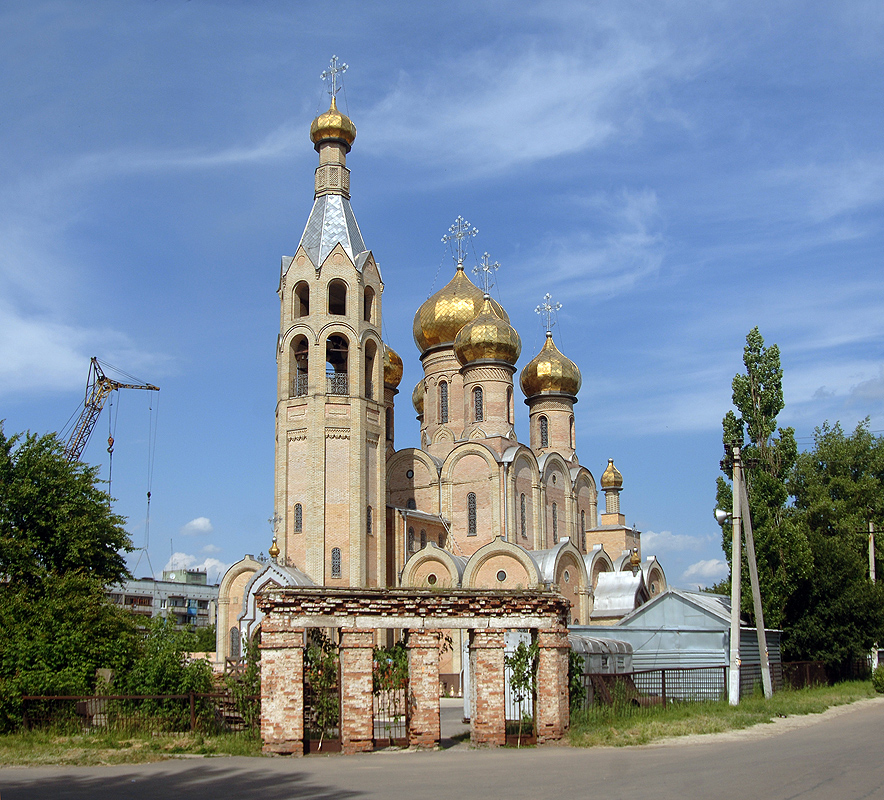
- Church of Our Lady Derzhavnaya

- Flag Seal
- Interactive map of Kurakhove
- Location within Donetsk Oblast Location within Ukraine
- Coordinates: 47°59′N 37°16′E
- Country: Ukraine
- Oblast: Donetsk Oblast
- Raion: Pokrovsk Raion
- Hromada: Kurakhove urban hromada
- Founded: 1924
- City status: 1956

Government
  - Military administration head: Roman Padun

Area
  - Total: 24 km^{2} (9.3 sq mi)
- Elevation: 122 m (400 ft)

Population (September 2024)
  - Total: 5,000 (approx)
  - Density: 210/km^{2} (540/sq mi)
- Time zone: UTC+2 (EET)
  - Summer (DST): UTC+3 (EEST)
- Postal code: 85490
- Area Code: +380 6237
- Climate: Dfb

Kurakhove (Ukrainian: Курахове, pronounced [kʊˈrɑxowe]; Russian: Курахово, romanized: Kurakhovo, Russian pronunciation: [kʊˈraxəvə]) is a city in Pokrovsk Raion, Donetsk Oblast, Ukraine. Population: 18,220 (2022 estimate); 21,479 (2001). Kurakhove is home to the Kurakhove Power Station. The city has been under Russian occupation since December 2024, the power station since January 2025.

== Geography ==
The city is located in the western part of the region on the left bank of the Kurakhovskoye Reservoir of Volchya River (a tributary of the Samara, the Dnieper basin).

== History ==
In 1969, during the expansion of the Kurakhove State District Power Plant (DRES), archaeologists uncovered 18 nomadic burials from the 12th century in the Velika Mohyla burial mound. These excavations revealed chainmail, a dagger, a saber, a quiver of arrows, and the skeleton of a horse with its bridle, indicating the area's significance during that period. The Vovcha River, which once had a greater water capacity, was historically an important waterway. To protect it as a transportation route, Zaporizhian Cossacks established watchposts and winter camps in the area, which eventually led to the founding of settlements.

=== Developments in the 20th century ===
In 1929, the Roevsky Elevator was built near the Roya railway station (later located on the outskirts of the city). Kurakhove was founded as a workers settlement in the west of the Donetsk region in 1936. The modern history of Kurakhove is closely linked to the construction of the Kurakhove State District Power Plant (DRES). In the 1930s, several small settlements existed in the area, including Novi Ulakli, Pervomaiske, Stari Terni, and Tivali. In subsequent years, the village of Illinka (previously known as Shakhove) and the workers' settlement of Roia were incorporated into the growing town of Kurakhove.

As part of the Soviet Union's first Five-Year Plan, the government decided to build a new power station in the Donbas to increase energy output for two key power systems in the southern European part of the USSR: "Donenergo" and "Prydniproenergo". The location for the plant was chosen in 1933, on the Vovcha River, about 15 kilometers from the village of Kurakhove. The construction site covered an area of 2,000 hectares, encompassing five nearby villages.

The initial project, approved by the Soviet government in 1934 and designed by the Russian Teploelektroproekt institutes, proposed a power plant capacity of 400,000 kW. However, in 1935, the capacity was reduced to 200,000 kW. The first turbine generator was scheduled to start operating in July 1938, with the full plant to be completed by early 1939. To ensure a stable water supply for the power plant, two dams, Illinska and Ternivska, were built across the Vovcha River. The primary fuel source for the plant was coal sludge, a byproduct of coal processing.

The construction of the DRES was considered an economically and politically critical task. In May 1936, the People’s Commissariat of Heavy Industry created construction organizations such as "Donbasvazhbud", "Donbaspetsbud", and "Soyuzekskavatsiya" to carry out the necessary work. The plant's construction was overseen by the communist leader V. I. Sokolovsky. Under his leadership, construction on both the power station and the nearby workers’ settlement began that summer.

The Donetsk Regional Committee of the Communist Party of Ukraine established a party organization for the project in June 1936. To strengthen the workforce, the Party Committee sent 15 communists and 50 Komsomol (Communist Youth) members to work on the project. By the end of 1936, a workers' settlement for energy workers was already under construction. The first three residential buildings were completed, providing housing for 130 workers. Essential services, such as a 28-bed hospital, a pharmacy, and a newly built school, were also established.

In 1937, work on the Kurakhiv DRES was temporarily halted to prioritize the completion of another major energy project, the Zuyivska DRES. Materials and equipment were transferred to the Zuyivska site, but the Kurakhove project resumed in late 1937 after the Zuyivska plant was finished.

In January–February 1938, Pervomayskoye was demolished, and the village council was transformed into the Kurakhovsky Gresstroy village council. On 27 October 1938, Kurakhovsky received the status of an urban-type settlement. Administrative-territorial division of the Union republics: changes that occurred from 1 October 1938 to 1 March 1939.

=== World War II and Nazi occupation ===
During Great Patriotic War, Kurakhove's DRES became a strategic target. When Nazi forces advanced toward Donetsk, a number of residents and plant workers organized defense efforts. The plant continued to supply electricity while simultaneously preparing for evacuation. Equipment that could not be evacuated was rendered inoperable to prevent its use by the Nazis. On 20 October 1941, Nazi forces captured Kurakhove, and many local residents who could not evacuate engaged in resistance efforts against occupation, including sabotage and support for partisan groups.

Kurakhove was retaken by Soviet forces on 9 September 1943. However, the retreating Nazis left the town in ruins, destroying much of its infrastructure, including the power plant. In 1943, the village received a new name—Kurakhovgres. Reconstruction efforts began immediately after the town’s liberation. By 1946, the power plant was operational again, with a production capacity of 100,000 kW, double its pre-war capacity.

=== Post-war reconstruction and expansion ===
Following the war, Kurakhove's reconstruction efforts accelerated. Between 1945 and 1952, the town expanded significantly and rapidly, with new residential areas, schools, kindergartens, hospitals and recreational facilities being built. The power plant was fully restored, and new turbines were installed, increasing its capacity to 650,000 kW by the mid-1950s. The plant became one of the largest in Ukraine, supplying energy to the Donbas and Dnipro industrial regions. New industries also emerged in Kurakhove during this period, including a boiler-mechanical plant and a factory producing concrete and construction materials. In 1956, it received city status and the name Kurakhovo.

On 22 July 1966, Kurakhove was incorporated into the Mariy district, and the workers' village of Roia was merged with the city. Roia had facilities for bread product sales and a cannery that produced 25 types of canned goods across 5 workshops. In 1968, the cannery produced 1,138,000 cans of goods and 100,000 tons of salted products. As part of another five-year plan, it was planned to increase the thermal power plant capacity to 1,600,000 kW until 1975. Numerous cultural and educational institutions were built, such as a 400-seat lecture hall and cinema, along with a music studio, hosting amateur arts such as drama groups, choirs, and orchestras, and a local library that held 41,000 books and organized literary events and meetings with writers.

By the late 1960s, Kurakhove had evolved into a significant industrial and energy hub. In addition to the power plant, the town housed a variety of industrial facilities, including plants for concrete production, tower cranes, and other industrial equipment. The expansion of residential areas, cultural institutions, and public services continued throughout the 20th century, making Kurakhove a well-developed urban center.

In 1973, the population was 16,000. The city had a state district power plant, a boiler-mechanical plant, a precast concrete plant, a mineral wool and structural plant, a canning factory, a bread factory, as well as branches of the Zuevsky Power Engineering College and the All-Union Power Engineering College.

The power plant was reconstructed between 1969 and 1975. By early 1981, Kurakhovo had a state district power plant, a boiler-mechanical plant, a cannery, five comprehensive schools, a technical college, a hospital, a clinic, three clubs, and 16 libraries.

In May 1995, the Cabinet of Ministers of Ukraine approved a decision to privatize the Kurakhovo Experimental Plant of Special Building Structures., in July 1995, the decision to privatize the construction and installation department of Kurakhovskaya was approved GRES, in October 1995 - the decision to privatize the Kurakhovsky mineral wool and structures plant.

=== 21st century and Russo-Ukrainian War ===
==== War in Donbas ====
The unrecognized 11 May 2014 Donetsk Oblast independence referendum was held in Kurakhove, but the city did not become part of the territory controlled by the self-proclaimed Donetsk People's Republic (who held the referendum). Since then, the city was located 10 kilometres (6.2 mi) west of the frontline during the Russo-Ukrainian War.

==== Russian invasion of Ukraine ====
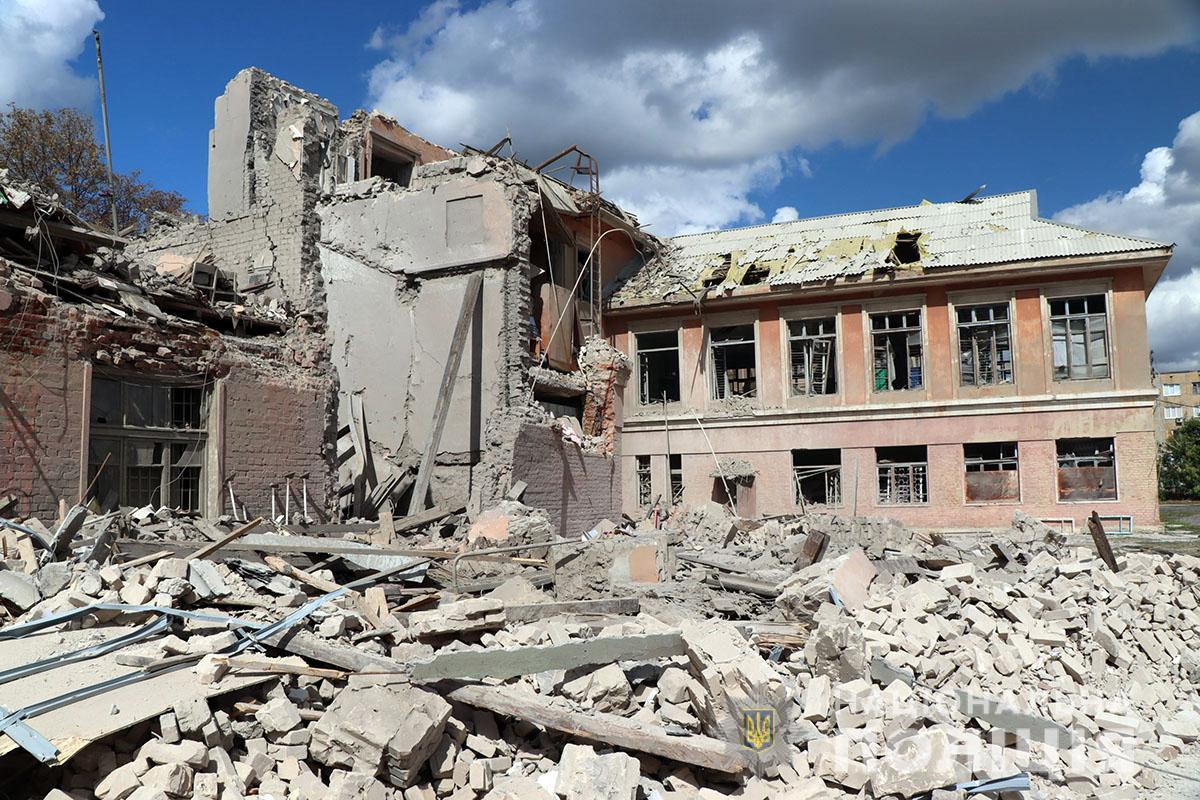
Kurakhove Gymnasium No. 2 after Russian shelling on the night of 6 September 2022

The city was noteworthy as a key defensive node in Ukrainian lines in southern Donbas. In late August to September 2024, after breakthroughs towards Pokrovsk, the Russian forces regrouped north and south of Kurakhove, attempting to encircle the Ukrainian troops. Russian forces entered Kurakhove from the east on 29 October. The city was fully captured by Russian forces in late December 2024.

== Demographics ==
As of the 2001 Ukrainian census, the town had a population of 21,516, which decreased to 18,220 in 2022. The majority of the population is ethnically Ukrainian, yet vastly Russian-speaking.

Ethnic groups in Kurakhove
Ethnic groups	percent
Ukrainians	71.33%
Russians	23.97%
Greeks	2.64%
Belarusians	0.50%
Azerbaijanis	0.21%
Armenians	0.13%
Georgians	0.12%
Moldovans	0.08%

Native languages in Kurakhove
Languages	percent
Russian	69.7%
Ukrainian	29.8%
Greek	0.1%
Belarusian	0.1%
others	0.2%

== Economy ==
A major thermal power plant is located in Kurakhove, the Kurakhove Power Station, part of the DTEK energy company, owned by Rinat Akhmetov. The power plant heavily influenced the city's history. As of November 2024, the power plant was decommissioned to supply other power plants and largely destroyed by Russian shelling. More than 50% of the total number of people employed in the national economy worked in industry.

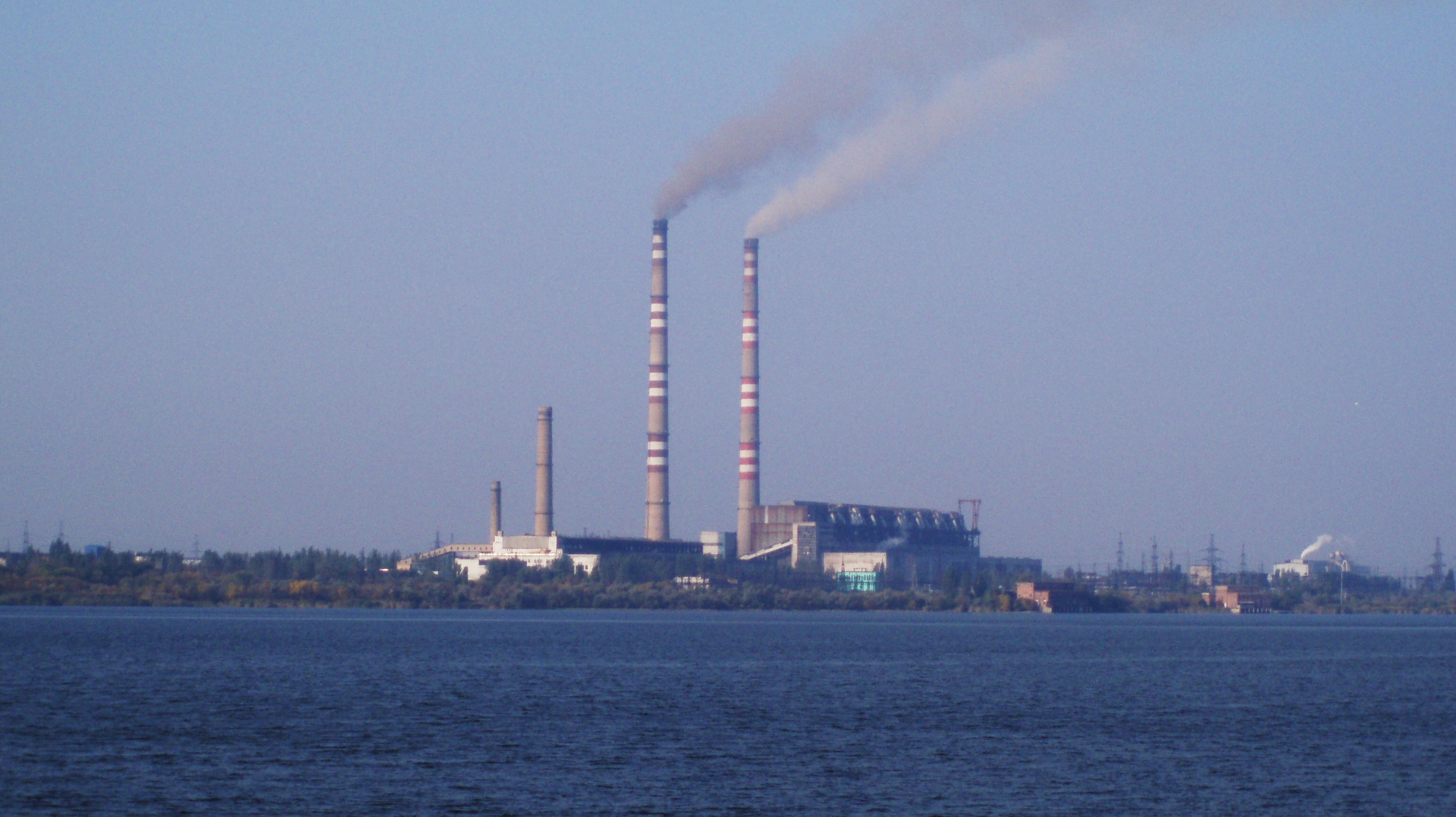
Kurakhovskaya Thermal Power Plant

=== Enterprises ===
- Kurakhove Thermal Power Plant
- Kurakhovsky Pipe Plant
- Kurakhovsky Fish Farm
- Olympic Sports Complex and Swimming Pool
- Hotel.
- Stadium.

The city was known for its recreational fishing on the Kurakhovsky Reservoir.

== Education ==
- Kurakhovo branch of the Pridneprovsk Energy Engineering Technical School
- Kurakhovo Gymnasium "Prestige"
- Kurakhovo Comprehensive School No. 5
- Kurakhovo Comprehensive School No. 2
- Kurakhovo Comprehensive School No. 1
- Kurakhovo Comprehensive School No. 3

== Microdistricts ==
- The Southern microdistrict is located in the southeastern part of the city and consists mainly of identical five-story panel apartment buildings.
- Ilinka is located on the northern shore of the Kurakhovskoye Reservoir.
- Roya is the eastern part of the city, consisting mainly of private housing.

== Transportation ==
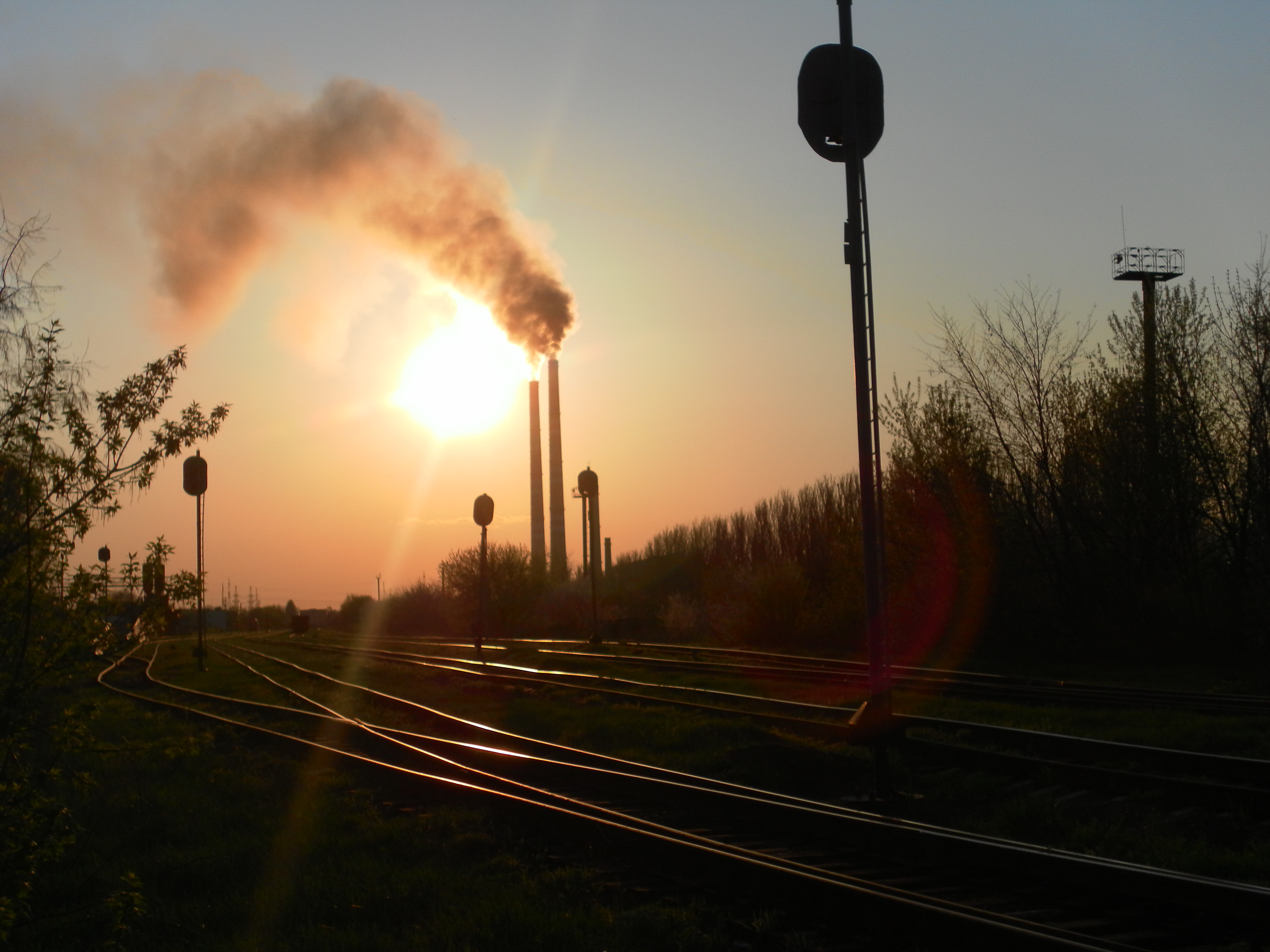
Sunset over the railroad tracks

Railway station. The city is connected by rail to Donetsk, Krasnogorovka, Tsukuryne, Pokrovsk, and other cities. The city's main transport artery is the Donetsk-Zaporizhzhia highway, which passes directly through Kurakhovo.

The city is connected by regular minibus routes to Donetsk and Maryinka, a bus service to Selidovo, and transit connections to Zaporizhzhia, Kherson, and elsewhere. There are no intracity public transport routes—commuter and intercity routes fully cover these needs. In May 2013, a city minibus service was introduced.

== Gallery ==
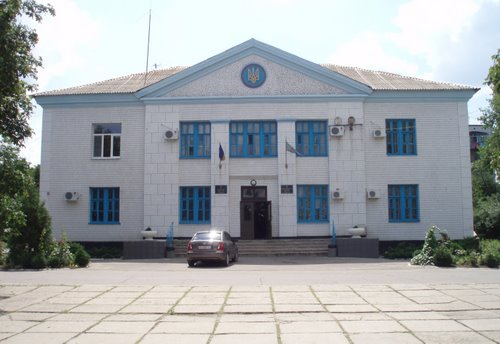
City council

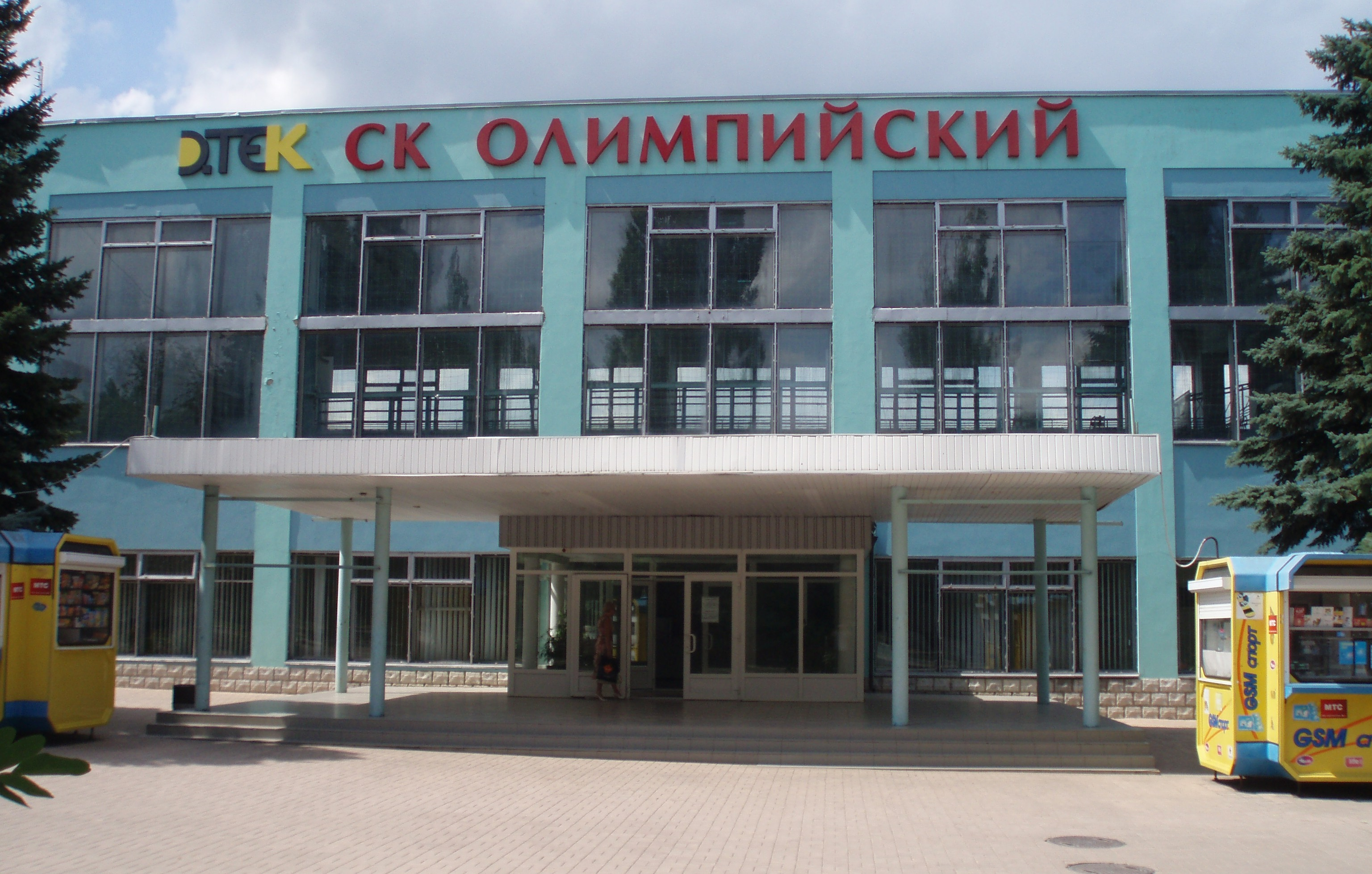
Sports centre

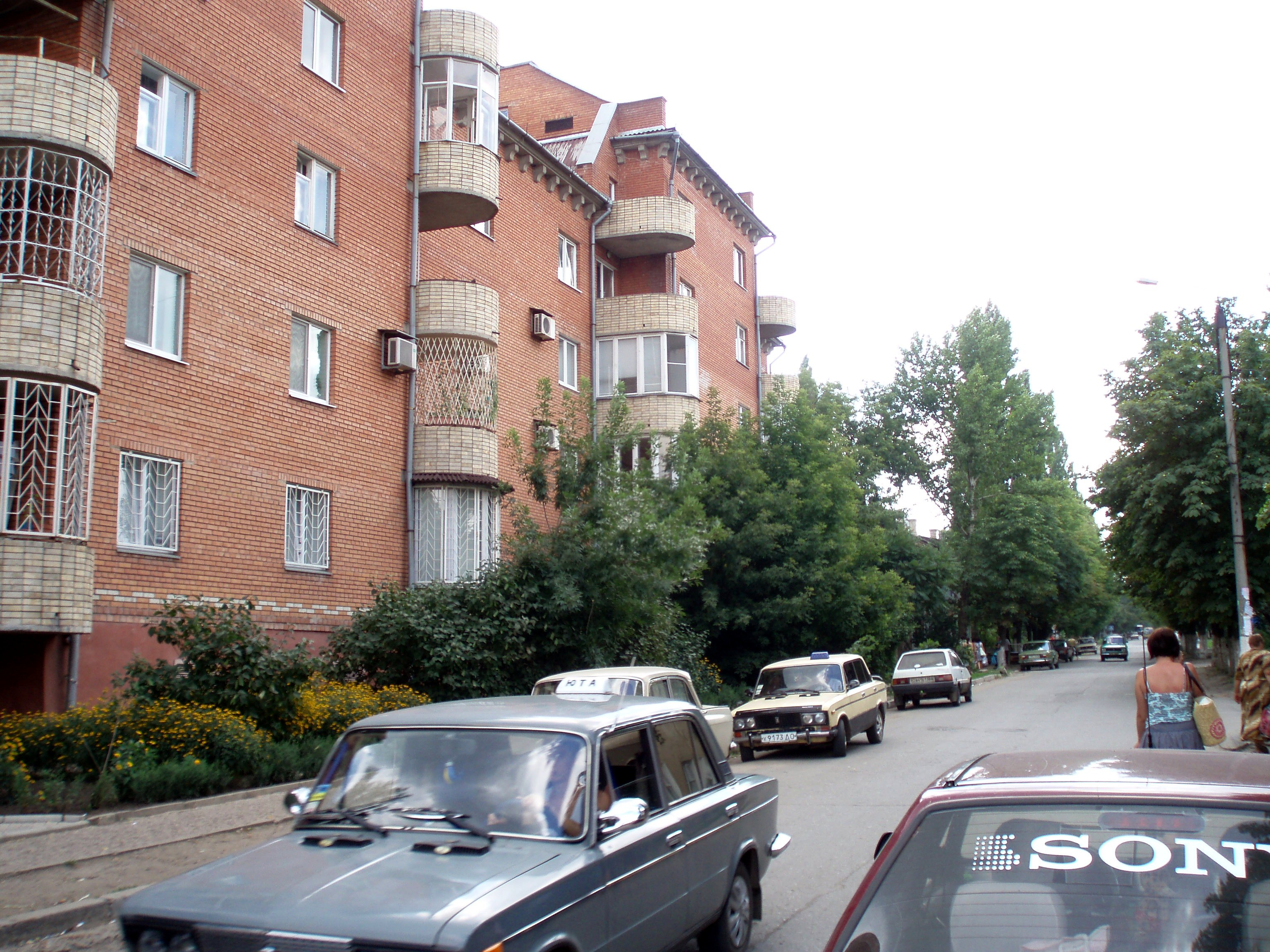
Lermontov Street in Kurakhove

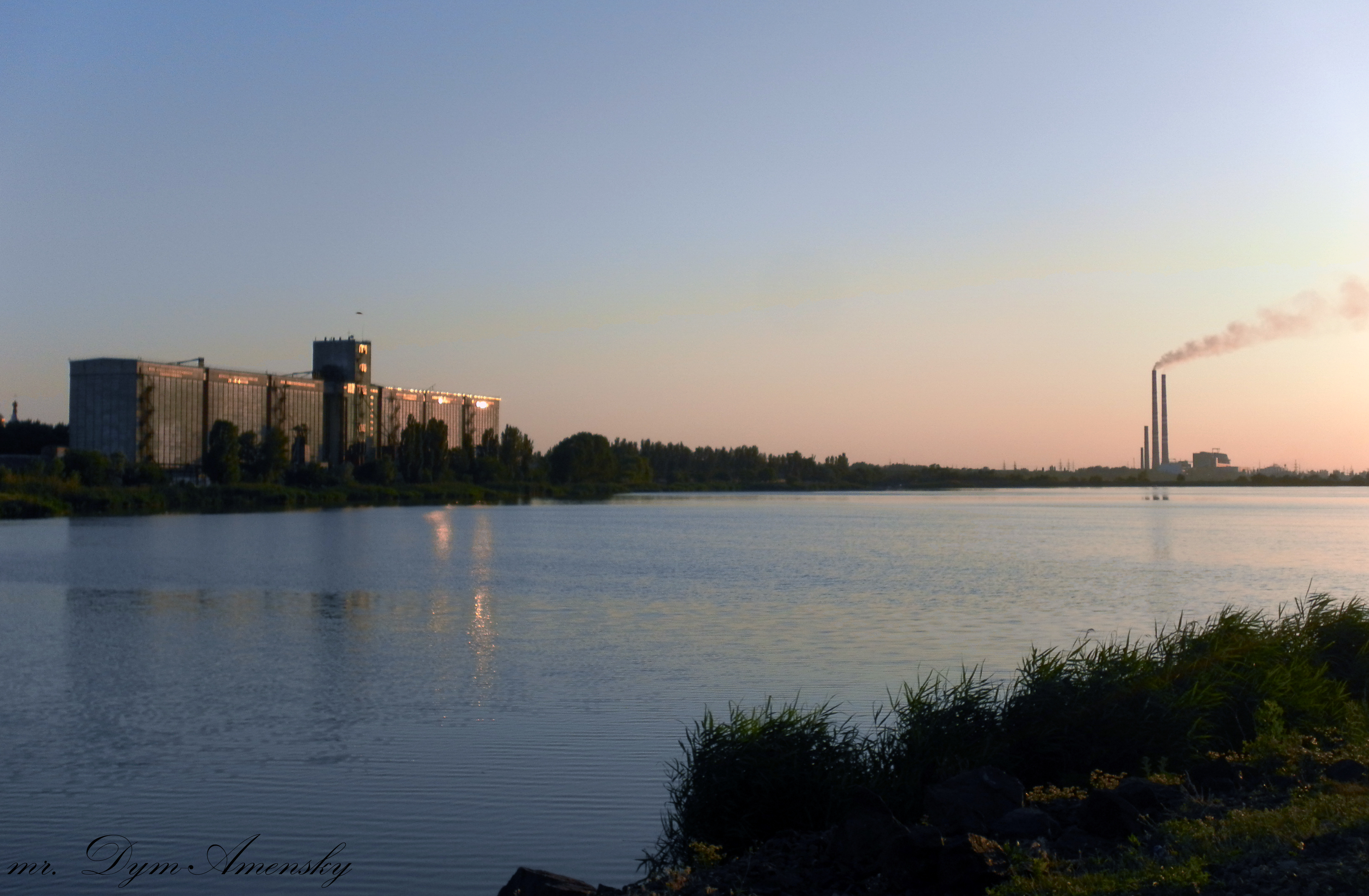
Kurakhove Reservoir

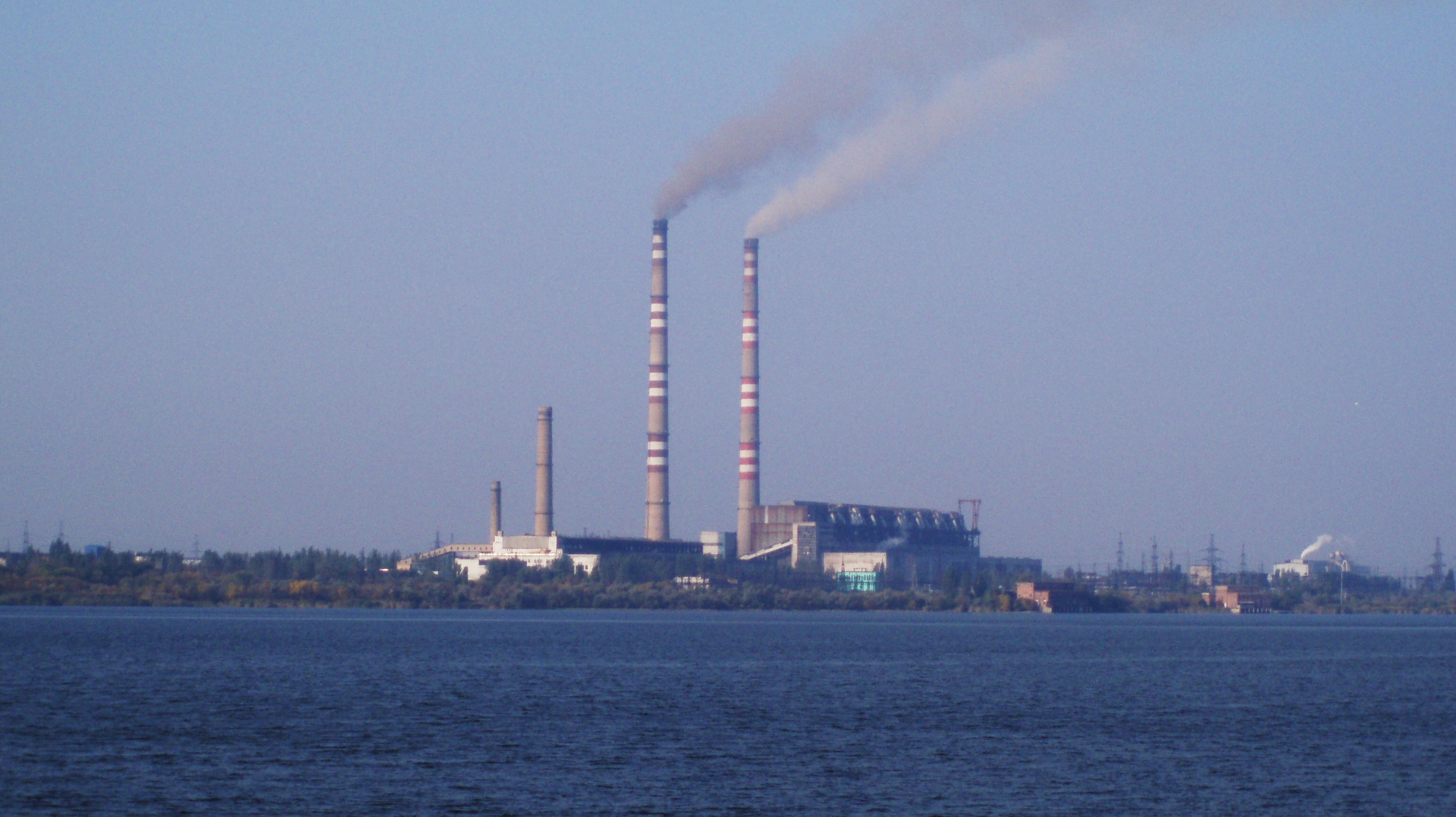
Kurakhove Power Station

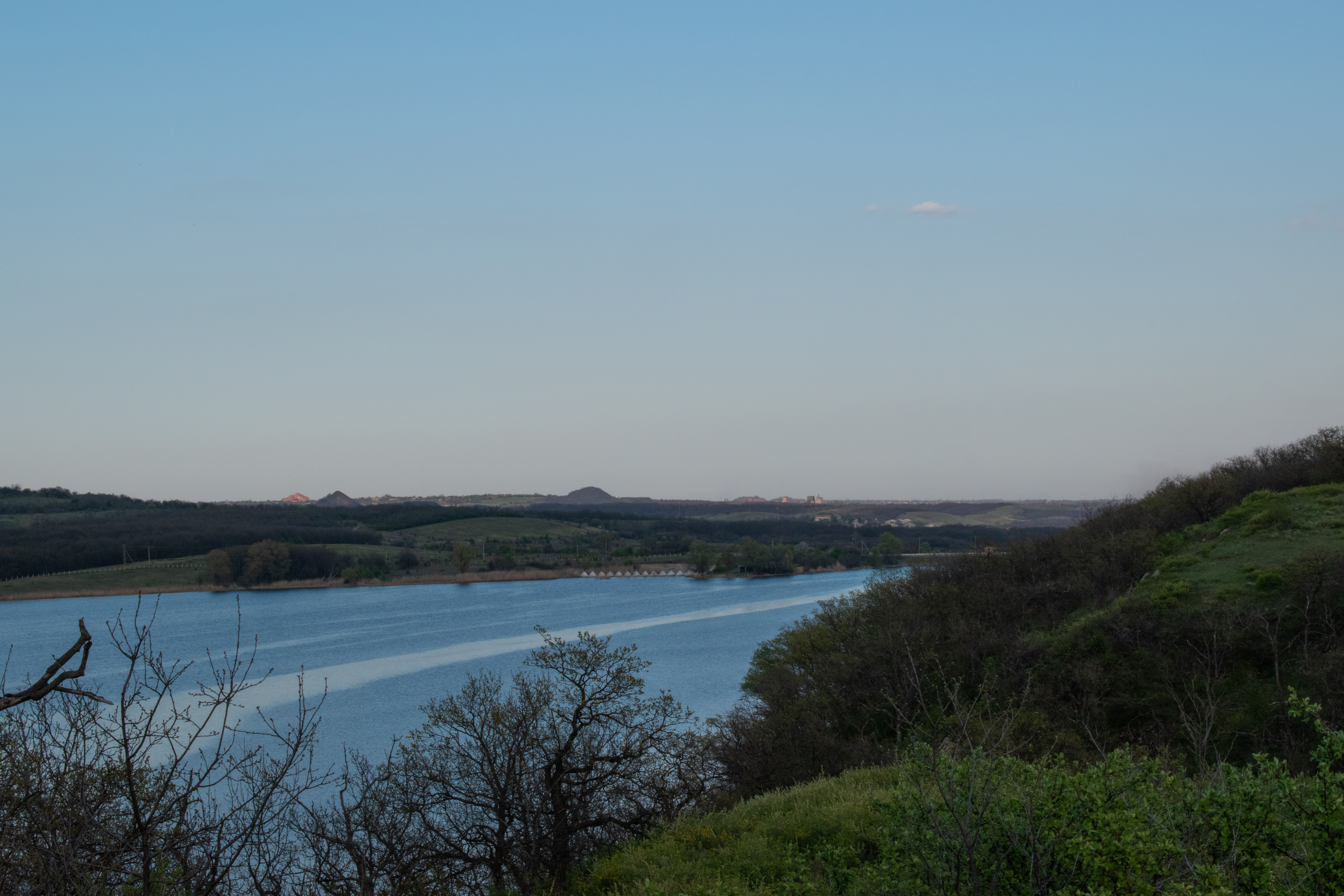
Kurakhove Valley

== Notable people ==
- Leonid Carasiov (born 1948), Russo-Moldovan military officer
- Volodymyr Moroz (1967-2025), Ukrainian politician and People's Deputy of Ukraine
