= Mironovka, Altai Krai =

Mironovka Мироновка
- Settlement
- Location within Altai Krai Location within Russia
- Coordinates: 53°48′N 85°26′E
- Country: Russia
- Region: Altai Krai
- District: Zarinsky District
- Time zone: UTC+7:00

Mironovka (Russian: Мироновка) is a rural locality (a settlement) in Zyryanovsky Selsoviet, Zarinsky District, Altai Krai, Russia. The population was 98 as of 2013. There are 5 streets.

== Geography ==
Mironovka is located 59 km northeast of Zarinsk (the district's administrative centre) by road. Zyryanovka is the nearest rural locality.
