= Dniproenergo =

Ukrainian energy company

Dniproenergo «Дніпроенерго»
- Company type: Public
- Traded as: PFTS: DNEN
- ISIN: UA4000080444
- Industry: power generation
- Headquarters: Zaporizhia, Ukraine
- Key people: Rinat Akhmetov (CEO)
- Revenue: ▲$480 million USD
- Total assets: 13,816,183,000 hryvnia (2025)
- Number of employees: 10,200
- Parent: Government of Ukraine (25%); DTEK (72.58%)
- Website: http://dniproenergo.ua/

Dniproenergo (Ukrainian: «Дніпроенерго») is a major electric and thermal energy producing companies in central Ukraine. Until 2012 it was known as Dniproenergo. Dniproenergo's share represents approximately 8.9% of total electric power generated in Ukraine.

== Structure and governance ==
The company is headquartered in Zaporizhzhia and its shares are traded on the PFTS stock exchange under the ticker DNEN. The company is controlled by DTEK, which holds a 72.58% stake, while the Government of Ukraine retains a 25% ownership share. DTEK, Ukraine's largest private energy company, is owned by Rinat Akhmetov through his System Capital Management (SCM) holdings company.

The company operates three major thermal power plants with a total installed capacity of 8,185 MW, representing approximately 16% of Ukraine's total installed electricity generation capacity.

- Kryvorizka Power Station
- Zaporizka Power Station
- Prydniprovska Power Station

== Developments during the Russian invasion ==
Since the beginning of the full-scale Russian invasion in February 2022, Dniproenergo’s thermal power stations have been repeatedly targeted by missile and drone strikes, sustaining serious damage that disrupted generation capacity and injured personnel. In September 2024, one of its largest plants was hit during a wave of attacks, marking the seventh large-scale assault on DTEK’s infrastructure since March 2024; DTEK estimated that around 90% of its available capacity had been destroyed or damaged, and three workers were injured.

In November 2024, during one of the war’s heaviest grid strikes, Russian forces launched approximately 120 missiles and 90 drones against Ukraine’s power system, with DTEK—operator of Dniproenergo—reporting “serious damage” to multiple thermal power plants; preliminary assessments indicated that more than 190 separate attacks had struck these facilities since 2022, though there were no fatalities in the November incident.

To restore lost capacity ahead of critical heating seasons, DTEK invested nearly UAH 4 billion in repairs to its thermal plants in late 2023 and early 2024; by mid-2024, ten units had been restored after previous attacks, although several were damaged again in the spring offensive.

Recognising the vulnerability of centralised thermal power during sustained hostilities, DTEK has also accelerated efforts to diversify generation through renewables. In January 2025, it announced a €450 million investment to expand the Tyligulska wind farm by 500 MW by 2026, a strategy designed to enhance grid resilience by decentralising capacity away from fixed targets.

== See also ==
- Ministry of Fuel and Energy (Ukraine)
