= Okhotnykove =

Village in Crimea

Okhotnykove: Охотникове (Ukrainian); Охотниково (Russian); Cağa Quşçu (Crimean Tatar)
- Village
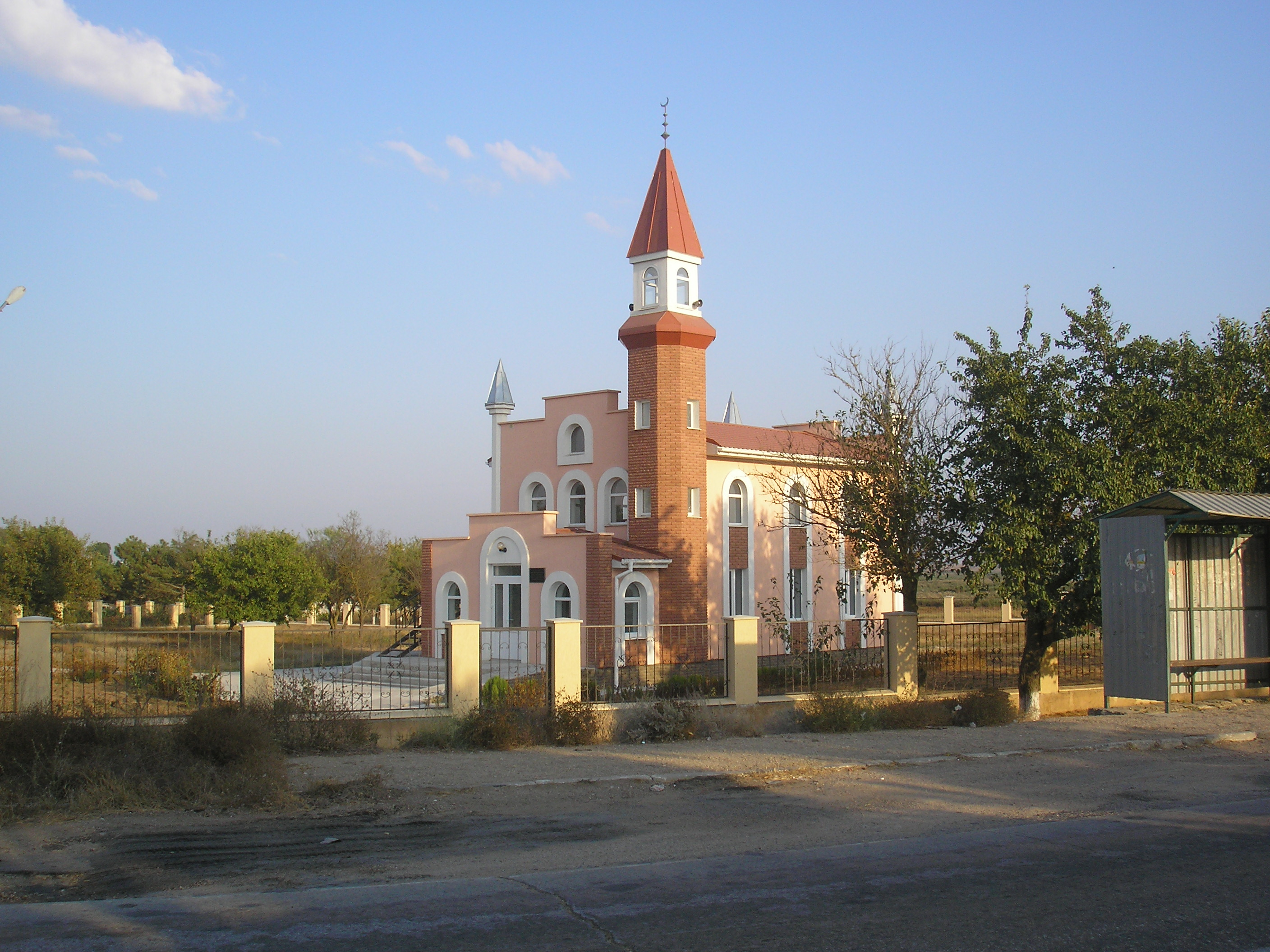
- Cağa Quşçu Camisi mosque in Okhotnikovo

- Location within Crimea Location within Ukraine
- Coordinates: 45°14′21″N 33°35′39″E
- Country: Ukraine (occupied by Russia)
- Republic: Crimea
- Raion: Saky Raion
- First mentioned: 1806

Population (2014)
  - Total: 1,550

Okhotnykove (Ukrainian: Охотникове; Russian: Охотниково, romanized: Okhotnikovo), known officially until 1948 by its Crimean Tatar name of Cağa Quşçu (Ukrainian: Джага-Кущи, romanized: Dzhaha-Kushchy; Russian: Джага́-Кущу́, romanized: Dzhaga-Kushchu) is a village in Crimea, a peninsula internationally recognised as part of Ukraine but occupied by Russia since 2014. It is currently administered as part of Saky Raion.

== History ==
Okhotnykove was first mentioned in a document dating to 19 April 1806, where its population was listed, in seventeen households, as including 105 Crimean Tatars, ten Crimean Roma, and four slaves. Between 1860 and 1864, the village was completely depopulated after its inhabitants fled amidst the Crimean War, and repopulated by Volga Tatars.

In 1926, the village had a population of 95. Of this population, 59 were Ukrainians, 24 were Tatars, and 13 were Estonians. With the deportation of the Crimean Tatars, the village was renamed to Okhotnykove by an act of the Presidium of the Supreme Soviet on 18 May 1948.

In 2011, the Okhotnykovo Solar Park was constructed in the village by Activ Solar.

== Demographics ==
According to the 2001 Ukrainian census, 69.7 percent of people in Okhotnykove spoke Russian, with 16.8 percent speaking Ukrainian and another 12.2 percent speaking Crimean Tatar. The total population of Okhotnykove was 1,550 according to the 2014 Crimean census, a decline from its 2001 population of 1,696.
