= Evacuation in the Soviet Union =

Mass migration during World War II

The front lines of fighting between the Wehrmacht and the Soviets in the first six months after Operation Barbarossa

Soviet citizens and its industries were evacuated eastward as a result of Operation Barbarossa, the invasion of Russia launched by Nazi Germany in June 1941 as part of World War II. Nearly sixteen million Soviet civilians and over 1,500 large factories were moved to areas in the middle or eastern part of the country by the end of 1941.

Along with the eastern exodus of civilians and industries, other unintended consequences of the German advance saw the execution of previously held western civilians by Soviet NKVD units, the removal of Lenin's body from Moscow to Tyumen, and the relocation of the Hermitage Museum collection to Sverdlovsk. Kuybyshev was chosen as the alternative capital of the Soviet Union if Moscow fell to the invading Germans. During the summer of 1943, everything was moved back to Moscow. Soviet towns and cities inland or in the east received the bulk of the new refugees and high-priority war factories, with locations such as the Siberian city of Novosibirsk receiving more than 140,000 refugees and many factories due to its location away from the front lines.

Despite early German successes in seizing control of large swaths of western USSR territory throughout 1943 and sketchy contingency plans by the Soviets for mobilization in the east, Soviet industries eventually outpaced the Germans in arms production; a total of 73,000 tanks, 82,000 aircraft and nearly 324,000 artillery pieces were distributed to the Red Army in their fight against the Axis powers by 1945.

== Government policy ==
Stalin and the Communist Party's Central Committee had received intelligence that Hitler would eventually turn on the Soviet Union; plans were made before Operation Barbarossa, and were launched to begin the evacuation as a precaution. Vasilii Prokhorovich Pronin, a Moscow party member on the city's evacuation committee, submitted a plan (rejected by Stalin) which would have removed about one million Muscovites. Not until the actual invasion did the party enact a real evacuation plan.

Two days after the German invasion, on June 24, 1941, the Party created an evacuation council in an attempt to develop a procedure for the evacuation of Soviet citizens living near the Eastern Front. It identified cities on major train routes from which people could be removed and brought east. By September, three months after the start of the invasion, the evacuation council had 128 centers identified and operating. Major cities which received evacuated citizens (as well as other resources and industry) included Kirov, Iaroslavl, Gorky, Ufa, Sverdlovsk, Cheliabinsk, and Kuibyshev.

Further measures were enacted by the party to help dispersed evacuees settle into life in their new location. Upon their arrival in a new city, they were instructed to contact local authorities so they could be accounted for. After this, they received certificates declaring their evacuee status which allowed them to receive lodging, food rations, and temporary employment. Evacuees were told that they were allowed to bring personal belongings with them as long as they did not hinder the ability of authorities to get them from the evacuated site to the refugee centre. Family members' belongings could not exceed 40 kilograms in weight.

Another instruction from the Central Committee in August and September was for regional governments to build temporary housing for the newcomers if there was not enough in that region already. This preceded a measure, enacted in November, in which the party established an evacuation administration; this removed power from regional authorities and centralized it within the Communist Party. Party offices popped up throughout the evacuation cities and regions to better regulate and look after the dispersed evacuees. Their agents were in charge of ensuring that the evacuees were well taken care of in their new locations and their concerns (including housing, employment, food, health care and child care) were being met. By early 1942, still less than a year since the start of the invasion, the Moscow government had already spent three billion rubles on the evacuation.

=== Deportation as part of evacuation ===
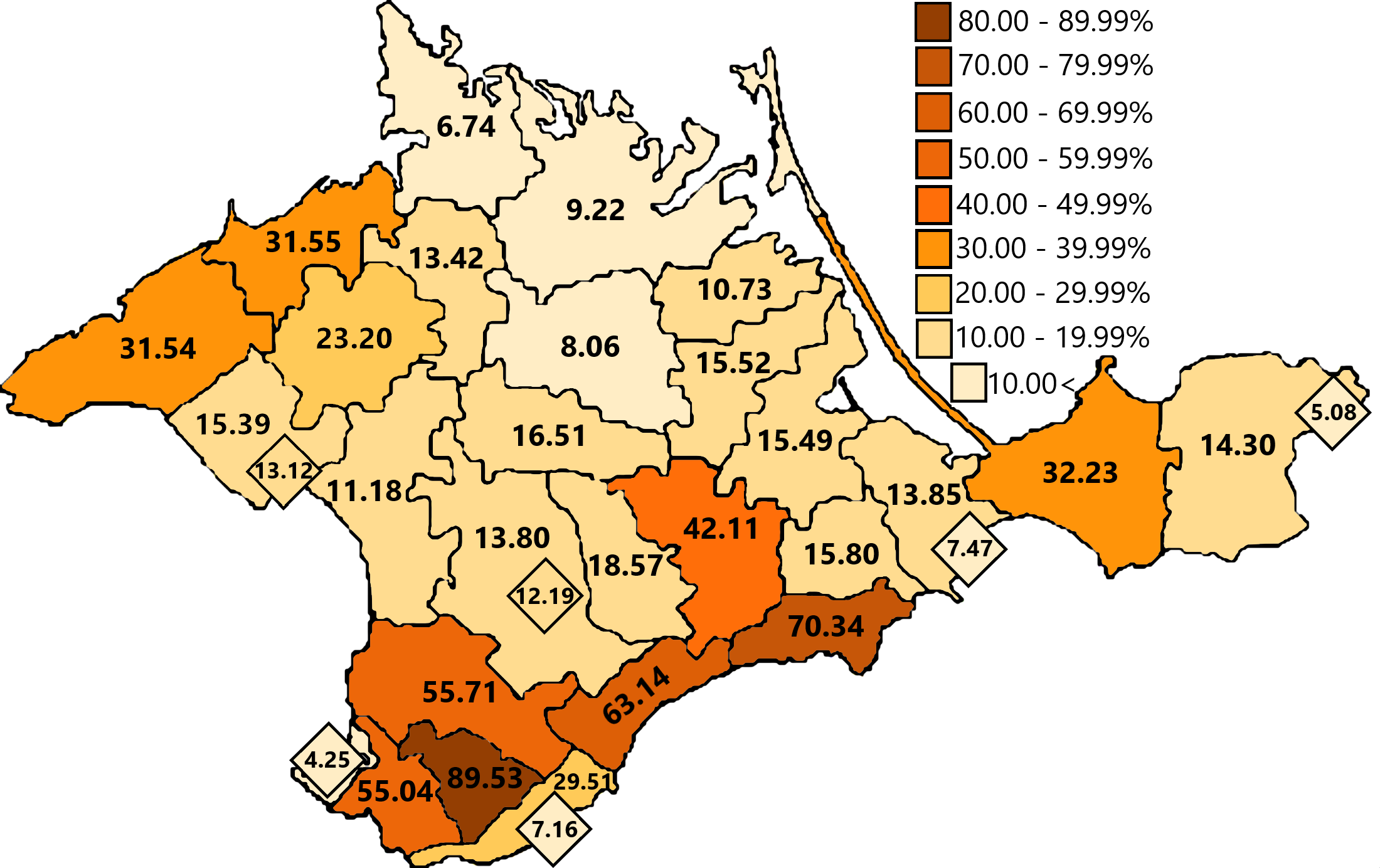
Crimea before the war, with the percentage of Tatars in each region

A large number of Soviet civilians who were evacuated were classified as deportees instead of evacuees, particularly those whom the party feared would switch loyalties and fight on the German side. This trend, which began with a 1941 decree dealing with the removal of Volga Germans to Siberia and Kazakhstan, eventually grew to affect as many as 3.3 million people and 52 nationalities. The rest of the evacuation of supposedly-disloyal nationalities took place later in the war, between 1943 and 1944. Because the Volga Germans were one of two deported nationalities (the other was the Crimean Tatars) who were never returned to their homeland after the war ended, modern historians interpret this as ethnic cleansing.

The Crimean Tatars were an exception to the party rule which assumed that suspected nationalities would be pro-German; the Tatars were a Muslim minority, and the party suspected that they would choose religion over state. Historians often trace the Soviet persecution and elimination of the Tatars in Crimea to the inter-war years, after the establishment of the Soviet state. It is reported that from 1917 to 1933, an estimated half of the Crimean Tatar population was eliminated by death or relocation.

The deported nationalities generally came from regions near the Eastern Front, and were settled in Kazakhstan and Central Asia during the war. In 1956, over a decade after the end of the World War II, all the groups except the Volga Germans and the Crimean Tatars were resettled in their native lands. Nikita Khrushchev absolved all blame from the Germans during his time leading the Communist Party. It is believed that the Volga Germans were not permitted to be resettled because the area had already been settled by other Soviet civilians since the end of the war. The same belief is held about why the Crimean Tatars were not granted resettlement as a part of the 1956 order. The Crimean Tatar National Movement Organization, organized during perestroika in the 1980s, finally received word from the Soviet government that their people could return to Crimea. After the collapse of the Soviet Union, about 250,000 Crimean Tatars returned and settled in Crimea (which was part of Ukraine until its 2014 annexation by the Russian Federation). Major wartime deportations were:

- 1941: Volga Germans
- 1943: Karachai
- 1943: Kalmyks
- 1944: Balkars
- 1944: Chechens and Ingushi
- 1944: Crimean Tatars
- 1944: Greeks
- 1944: Meskhetian Turks

== Evacuation of industry ==
The speed of the initial German advance threatened not only Soviet territories and factories (civilian and military), but the wholesale collapse of the nation's civilian economy. Even with 1930s contingency plans and the formation in 1941 of evacuation committees such as the Council for Evacuation and the State Department Committee (GKO), most evacuations were handled by local Soviet organizations which dealt with industrial movements just ahead of impending German attacks.

Short-sighted preparation in the overall mobilization of the Western front led many in these councils to scour Moscow libraries for resources pertaining to evacuations during the First World War. Local committees eventually used a five-year-plan structure, with 3,000 agents controlling movement. Evacuation of industrial plants began in August 1941, and continued until the end of the year.

The GKO oversaw the relocation of more than 1,500 plants of military importance to the Urals, Siberia, and Central Asia. These areas offered safety to their inhabitants due to their isolated locations (out of reach of damaging Axis airstrikes), and they offered Soviet industries a massive quantity of resources for the factories and plants associated with the war effort. The Urals, in central Russia, developed an impressive array of iron and steel factories as well as agriculture and chemical plants. Siberian industries relied on the coal mines and copper deposits in the Kuznetzk coal basin to support the Soviet war machine.

Some evacuations and the transfer of machine tools and skilled workers to "shadow factories" in the east began much earlier. The U.S. military attaché reported significant transfers of machinery and men from the Moscow area to the east in late 1940 and early 1941. The rapid growth in production early in 1942 suggests that the evacuation began in 1940.

== Evacuation of civilians ==
In 1941, the word "evacuation" (эвакуация, evakuatsiia) was a new word which was not used by everyone. "Refugee" (bezhenets) was far too familiar, however, given the country's history of war. During World War II, the word "refugee" was replaced by "evacuee"; the shift in wording indicated government resignation to the displacement of its citizens. Reasons for controlling the displaced population varied. Despite some preference for considering themselves evacuees, the term referred to different individuals. Some were privileged elites, such as scientists, specialized workers, artists, writers and politicians, who were evacuated to the interior of the country. Other evacuees were viewed with suspicion. The evacuation process, despite best Soviet efforts, was far from organized; the state considered most of those heading east as suspicious. Since most were self-evacuating, they had not been assigned a location for displacement. Officials feared that disorder made it easy for deserters to flee. Evacuees who did not fall into the "privileged elite" category were seen as potentially contaminating the rest of the population, epidemically and ideologically.

Since the beginning of the 20th century, Russia had been engulfed in wars. If this war-bred society learned anything, it was the importance of mobilizing its industry and its civilian population. The Russian Civil War and World War I gave the Bolsheviks experience which shaped their future evacuation strategies. Preparation for future war began during the early 1920s, but it was not until the war scare of 1927 that the Soviets began developing defensive measures (including evacuation policies). These policies were not developed for humanitarian reasons, but as a way for the country to defend itself. They needed to avoid past issues such as hindered military movement, communicable disease, demoralization of units, and strains on the economy. The Council of Labor and Defense and other Soviet administrations were in charge of drafting these policies.

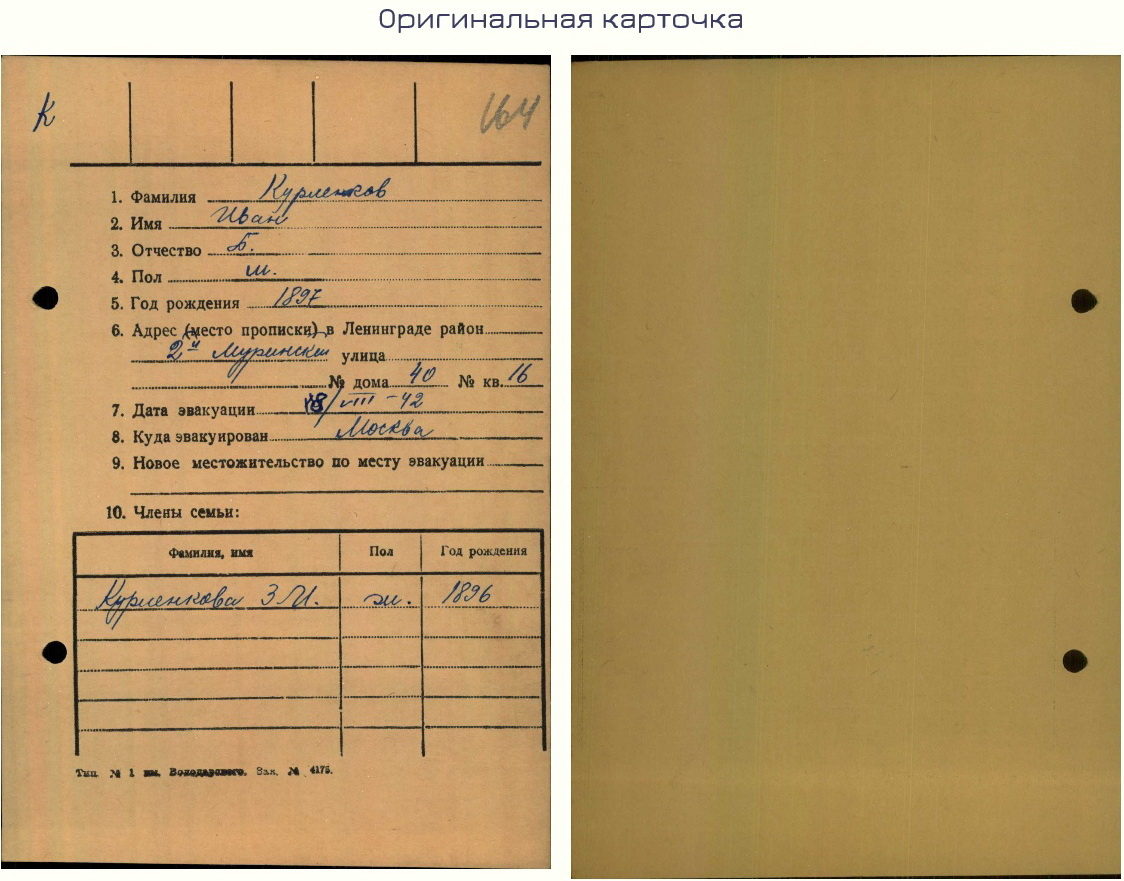
Evacuation card

Operation Barbarossa displaced millions of Russians. The exact number is hard to pinpoint, since many evacuated themselves. Some put the number at about sixteen and a half million. One of the most welcome sights for refugees during the evacuations was Tashkent, the capital of Uzbekistan, which eventually housed tens of thousands of refugees. Due to the large number of refugees, train stations were overcrowded and the distribution of train tickets could take days. Even with the war drawing to an end, evacuees who were desperate to go back home were not granted permission. The repatriation policy was written around those not working in industry; those citizens lost residency in their city of origin, and were not part of the repatriation process. Anybody who tried to return without consent faced imprisonment. Despite many roadblocks and other issues, the Soviet Union evacuated millions of its citizens to safety in the rear.

With a shortage of labor, the Commissariat of Justice and the Council of People's Commissars forced evacuees to work in enterprises, organizations and on collective farms to help the war effort. Those chosen for the labor force were those deemed socially unproductive. People who did not work for a set wage, such as artists, writers and artisans, were excluded from this new decree. Problems arose with worker motivation; some were unhappy with their wages when they returned to their homes, saying that the government paid almost as much in subsidies as they would earn from working.

As winter approached and the war intensified around Moscow, the Moscow Oblast committee of the Communist Party and the executive committee of the Moscow Oblast Council found it very important to evacuate women and children from the suburbs. They asked the Evacuation Council of the Soviet Council of People's Commissariats to evacuate 300,000 people via the People's Commissariat of Transportation.

== Jewish families ==
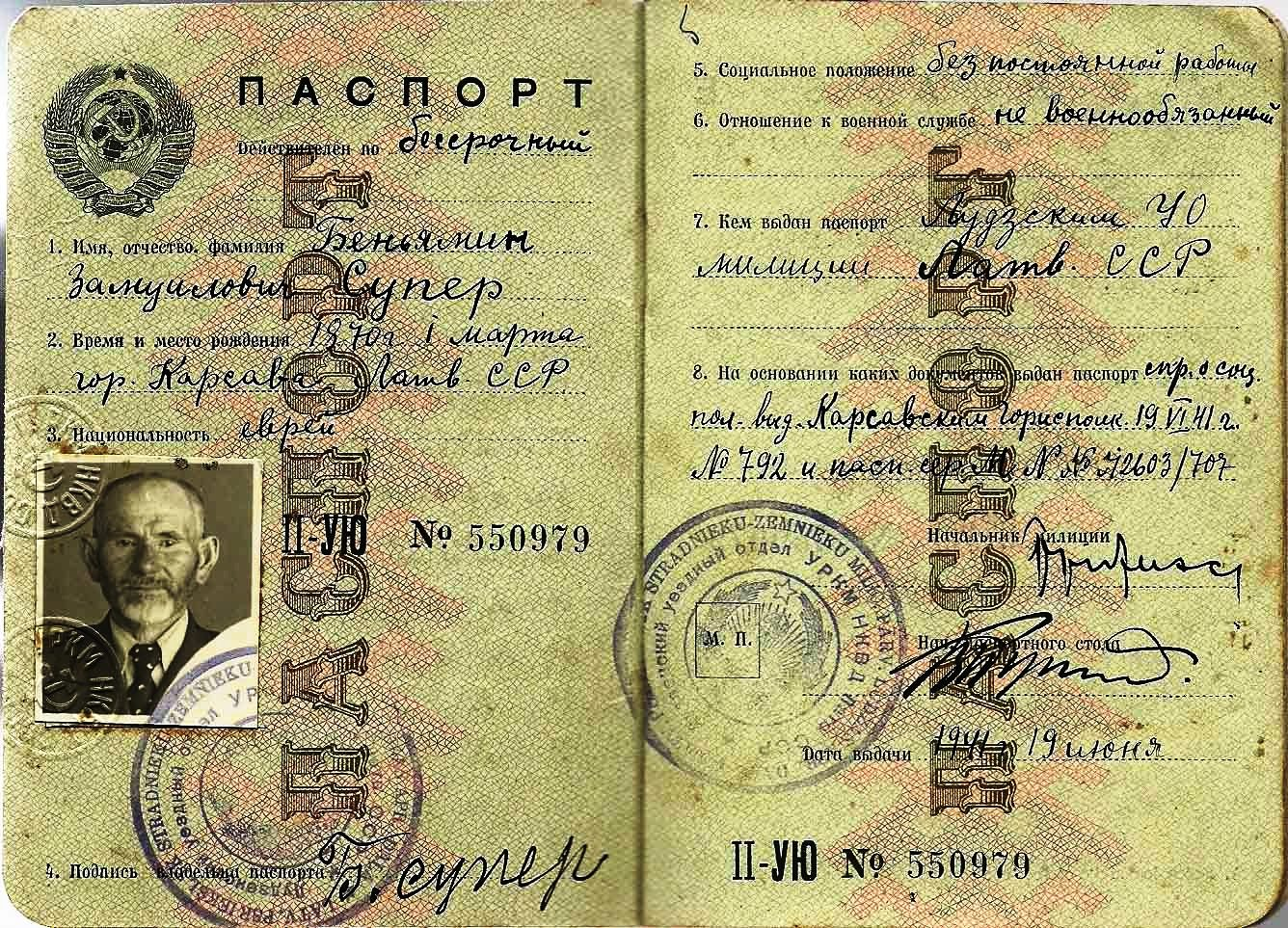
Internal passport issued to a Lithuanian Jew in 1941; the holder was later evacuated to Kuybyshev (Samara).

The Soviet Union had added nearly 2,000,000 Jews to its population between 1939 and 1940 from recently invaded Poland and other areas. After the Molotov–Ribbentrop Pact, the USSR and Germany took over large portions of Eastern Europe (including Poland, the Baltic region, and parts of Romania). The USSR occupied and annexed eastern Romania, including Bessarabia and Northern Bukovina (where an estimated 250,000 Jews lived at the time), but also the Hertsa region. Another 120,000 Jews migrated into newly annexed Bessarabia and Northern Bukovina from the remainder of Romania. By the late spring of 1941, as many as 415,000 Jews lived in Soviet-annexed Bessarabia and Northern Bukovina. Around 10,000 of these newly-Soviet Jews were deported to the interior for a variety of reasons, many ending up in the Red Army. The creation of the Jewish Anti-Fascist Committee is evidence that the Soviet government made some effort to incorporate displaced Jewish citizens into Soviet society. Many Jews living in Romania and Nazi-occupied Poland were reluctant to move to Russia, whose policies toward religion did not favor them. Many underestimated the dangers of the impending Nazi war machine, and were murdered; Jews who fled to Russia from Germany, however, said "better Stalin than Hitler". During World War II, an estimated 700,000 to 3,000,000 Jews were killed in the Nazi-occupied territories of the Soviet Union by the Einsatzgruppen.

When Germany invaded Russia in 1941, most Jewish citizens were murdered by the Nazis; some Jewish families, however, fled east into Russia. Although the Soviet Union did not keep records specifically related to Jews, an estimated 300,000 people were deported from the territories annexed from Romania into locations such as Kazakhstan; it is unknown how many were Jewish. In February 1942, as many as 45,000 displaced Jewish citizens from these territories lived in Uzbekistan. An estimated 80,000 to 85,000 Jews from these territories were moved to other Soviet states by early 1942.

== Stalin and the Politburo ==
During the first ten days of the invasion, Stalin invited Yevgenia "Zhenya" Zemlyanitsyn (the wife of Pavel Alliluyev, the brother of Stalin's second wife Nadezhda Alliluyeva) to the Kuntsevo Dacha. He asked her to take his daughter, Svetlana, and the other children to his dacha in Sochi (far from the fighting). She refused, and they never saw each other again. Svetlana and the other children instead travelled to Sochi with Anna Redens (Nadezhda's sister), where they remained until the front approached them.

Stalin remained in Moscow during the invasion, uncertain whether the Politburo should stay to defend the city or evacuate. He read history books (including a biography of Mikhail Kutuzov, who had abandoned Moscow during the French invasion of Russia in 1812) and consulted those close to him. His housekeeper, Valentina (his mistress, according to historian Simon Sebag Montefiore), supported Moscow's defence when he asked for her opinion in front of other Politburo members, and Svetlana wrote a letter to him which could be interpreted as also encouraging defence. Stalin asked General Georgy Zhukov, who was in charge of the Russian army, whether Moscow could be held; Zhukov answered in the affirmative.

At a meeting from which Stalin was absent, Lavrentiy Beria argued that they should be evacuated beyond the Volga. Georgy Malenkov agreed, but Vyacheslav Molotov disagreed. When Stalin called a meeting of Politburo members and generals at which the final decision was made, however, they all said that the city should be defended. During the German approach to Moscow, the Politburo spent a great deal of time working underground in the Moscow Metro.

== Lenin's body ==
In the face of the German advance and amidst the evacuations of industry and civilians, the Politburo decided to evacuate the embalmed body of Vladimir Lenin from the mausoleum in Red Square where it had been on display since 1924. Lenin's body was removed in secret and sent far from the front lines, away from industrial areas threatened by German bombers. The city of Tyumen, about 2,500 kilometers east of Moscow, was the chosen destination. In June 1941, his body was encased in paraffin and placed in a wooden coffin which was nested inside a larger wooden crate. With the body were sent chemicals and implements necessary for its continued preservation. The crate was placed on a dedicated train, secured by a select group of Kremlin guards. The body, in a private car, was guarded around the clock. Additional soldiers were posted along the tracks and stations on the train's route east.

On arrival in Tyumen, the body was housed in a dilapidated building on the campus of the Tyumen Agricultural Institute. Conditions necessitated additional chemicals and distilled water from Omsk, 600 kilometers east of Tyumen. Lenin's body was returned to Moscow in April 1945.

== See also ==
- World War II evacuation and expulsion
- Soviet evacuation of Tallinn
- Strategic depth
