= Centrenergo =

Ukrainian energy company

Centrenergo «Центренерго»
- Type: Public
- Traded as: PFTS: CEEN
- Industry: power generation
- Headquarters: Kyiv, Ukraine
- Key people: Serhiy Isachenko (CEO)
- Revenue: 23,008,697,000 hryvnia (2025)
- Total assets: 11,456,405,000 hryvnia (2025)
- Number of employees: 7,800
- Parent: Government of Ukraine (78.29%)
- Website: www.centrenergo.com

Centrenergo (Ukrainian: «Центренерго») is a major electric and thermal energy-producing company in central Ukraine and eastern Ukraine.

The main activities of Centerenergo are the production of electricity supplied to the wholesale electricity market of Ukraine and the production of thermal energy.

The company's share in the total electricity production of Ukraine is about 8%, in the structure of thermal generation - about 18%. It plays a significant role in maintaining and regulating the country's energy balance.

== History ==
The company was established in 1995 on the basis of the TPPs as the state enterprise "Centrenergo". In 1996, it was decided by the Ministry of Finance of Ukraine to privatise it, and in 1998, it was re-registered as the open joint stock company "Centrenergo", before again being re-named in March 2011 to its current name, PJSC "Centrenergo". Over the years, there have been numerous attempts by the state to officially privatise it, as it is the last remaining state-owned power-generating company in Ukraine that operates TPPs. The first attempt was in 2013, but it was delayed because of an accident at Vuhlehirska that killed an employee and started a major fire that burned parts of the building. Thus, the competition was canceled for privatisation. The most recent attempt was in December 2018, when the state put up a 78.3% stake in the company for 6 billion hryvnias, but the only qualified participants were disqualified. In 2020, the company was briefly banned by the Commercial Court of Kyiv from privatising because of a dispute between Ukrdoninvest and the State Property Fund. The Kyiv Prosecutor's Office then initiated criminal proceedings against the judge's decision.

In 2025, the Swedish fund Swedfund announced they would be willing to private a grant to modernise Trypillya in Kyiv and convert it to a biofuel source. According to the investigative journalism outlet Bihus, Centrenergo in 2025 deliberately slowed down negotiations for funding by Swedfund because transitioning from coal to biofuel, or even modernising to reduce coal consumption in line with Europe, would threaten demand for Ukrainian coal. Despite this, in April 2026, the European Investment Bank signed a 350,000-euro agreement with Centrenergo to help the company transition into a decarbonization strategy and phase towards near-zero emissions so that the company could move away from coal and, in the future, focus on attracting international funding.

In 2026, it was confirmed that Ukraine again wanted to privatise the company according to the State Property Fund of Ukraine, but that this would require first repairing Trypilska. It was announced that this could be completed as early as 2027 and that, in order to do so, the state would need to prepare Trypilska for the next season, restore it, and draft documents for the future privatisation tender. However, independent energy analysts have put doubt on this plan, as they have stated that nobody would invest in repairing Trypilska in the midst of the war when it could again be destroyed.

== Structure ==
The Company consists of three thermal power plants: Trypillya Power Station in Kyiv Oblast, Zmiivska Power Station in Kharkiv Oblast and Vuhlehirska Power Station in Donetsk Oblast. It also owns a separate division of Remenergo, located in Cherkasy. The total installed capacity of production assets is 7690 MW, which is about 14% of the total capacity of power plants in Ukraine. To produce its products, the company uses pulverized coal, natural gas and oil.

== Russian-Ukrainian war ==
On July 25, 2022, Russian forces occupied the Vuhlehirska TES in Donetsk Oblast.

On March 22, 2024, all units of the Zmiivska TES were destroyed.

On April 11, 2024, the Trypilska TES was destroyed by a combined Russian attack using drones and missiles.

On November 8, 2025, all three of Centrenergo's power plants were damaged and shut down following a wave of Russian drone attacks.

== See also ==
- Ministry of Fuel and Energy (Ukraine)
