= Myronivskyi =

Myronivskyi Миронівський
- Rural settlement
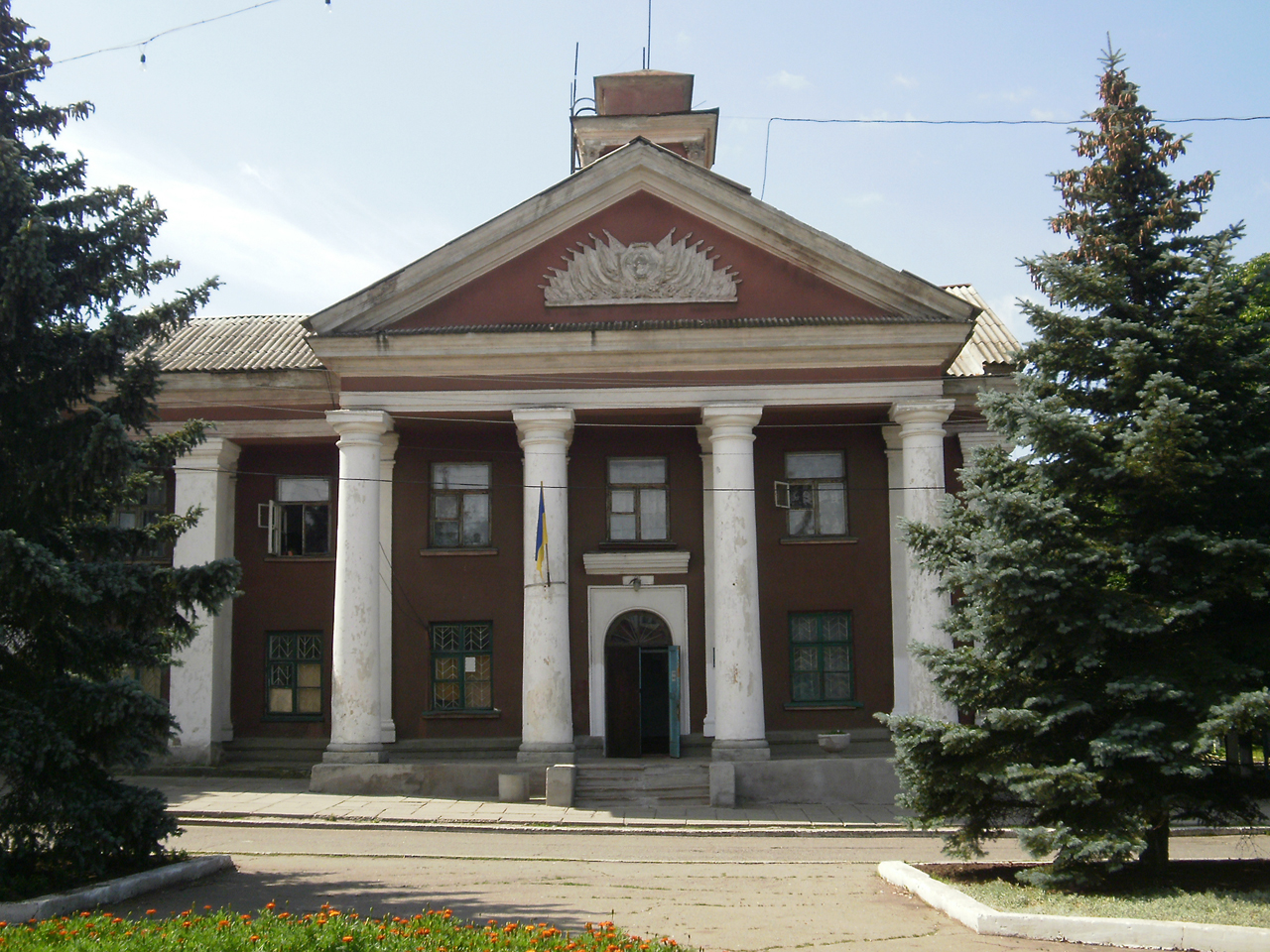
- Interactive map of Myronivskyi
- Location within Donetsk Oblast Location within Ukraine
- Coordinates: 48°28′00″N 38°16′36″E
- Country: Ukraine
- Oblast: Donetsk Oblast
- Raion: Bakhmut Raion
- Hromada: Svitlodarsk urban hromada
- Established: blank_name =

Population (2022)
  - Total: 7,221

Myronivskyi (Ukrainian: Миронівський; Russian: Миро́новский) is a rural settlement in Bakhmut Raion, Donetsk Oblast, eastern Ukraine. The population is 7,221 (2022 estimate).
