= Governorate (Russia) =

1708–1929 subdivision of Russia

Governorates of Russia
- Category: Subdivision of a unitary state
- Created by: "On the establishment of the gubernias and cities assigned to them"
- Created: December 18, 1708
- Abolished: October 1, 1929
- Number: 78 governorates (117 total primary units with oblasts) (as of 1914)
- Subdivisions: Provinces (1719–1775), uezds (counties), volosts

A governorate (Russian: губе́рния, romanized: gubérniya, pre-1918 spelling: губе́рнія, IPA: [ɡʊˈbʲernʲɪjə]) was the principal first-level administrative division of the Tsardom of Russia and the Russian Empire from 1708 to 1917. Governorates were subdivided into uezds (districts) and further partitioned into volosts.

Established by Peter the Great on December 18, 1708, to centralize administration and tax collection during the Great Northern War, the system initially comprised eight large governorates. The framework was comprehensively standardized in November 1775 under Catherine the Great, who instituted a uniform territorial structure delineated strictly by population thresholds. A governorate was administered by an appointed governor (губернатор, gubernator). Large frontier territories and imperial dependencies, such as Congress Poland, the Grand Duchy of Finland, and Russian Turkestan, were frequently grouped into wider jurisdictions overseen by a governor-general, while sparsely populated or border regions were alternatively organized as oblasts.

Following the 1917 revolutions, governorates were temporarily retained by the Russian Provisional Government and the early Soviet Union (including within the Russian, Ukrainian, and Byelorussian Soviet republics). Between 1923 and 1929, the imperial administrative geography was completely phased out and replaced by the Soviet economic zoning system of oblasts, okrugs, and raions.

== History ==
=== First reform (Peter the Great, 1708) ===
Division of Russia into eight governorates in 1708

Prior to the 18th century, the Russian state was divided into numerous uezds administered directly from central prikazy in Moscow by appointed voivodes.

To centralize revenue collection and streamline military conscription during the Great Northern War, Peter the Great issued an edict on December 18, 1708 (O.S.), titled "On the establishment of the gubernias and cities assigned to them", which divided Russia into eight initial governorates: Archangelgorod, Azov, Ingermanland (later renamed Saint Petersburg), Kazan, Kiev, Moscow, Siberian, and Smolensk.

=== Second reform (1719) ===
On May 29, 1719, Peter I reorganized the system into a three-tier administrative hierarchy. Governorates were subdivided into provinces, each overseen by a voivode with substantial local authority, while provinces were further partitioned into districts. Through territorial annexations and internal administrative realignments, the number of governorates had increased to 23 by 1764.

=== Reform of 1775: Viceroyalty ===
Subdivisions of the Russian Empire in 1914

On November 7, 1775, Catherine the Great promulgated the "Statute for the Administration of the Governorates of the All-Russian Empire", standardizing territorial administration based strictly on population figures. Under this reform, intermediate provinces were abolished in favor of a direct two-tier governorate–uezd structure. Each primary unit, designated as a viceroyalty or governorate, was delineated to encompass approximately 300,000 to 400,000 male revision souls, while subordinate uezds were designed to contain 20,000 to 30,000 inhabitants.

The statute established a clear institutional division between administrative bodies and judicial tribunals. It also established corporate institutions of noble self-government headed by elected Marshals of Nobility.

On December 31, 1796, Emperor Paul I reorganized territorial governance by abolishing the viceroyalty designation, reverting all primary units to governorates, and consolidating territories to reduce their overall number. By 1914, on the eve of World War I, the Russian Empire encompassed 78 governorates alongside 21 oblasts, 2 independent okrugs, and 9 city prefectures (gradonachalstva).

== Governorates in Poland and Finland ==
The imperial governorate framework was also extended to autonomous borderland dependencies. In the Grand Duchy of Finland, governorates were designated in Swedish as län and in Finnish as lääni. In Congress Poland, subdivisions were organized as Polish gubernia following administrative integration during the 19th century.

== Post-revolutionary changes ==
Following the February Revolution of 1917, the Russian Provisional Government replaced imperial governors with appointed governorate commissars. Following the October Revolution, the Bolshevik administration transferred executive power to provincial executive committees of governorate soviets (губисполком).

Between 1918 and 1929, the Soviet leadership completely dismantled the imperial administrative geography. Guided by the GOELRO plan of national electrification, Ivan Alexandrov and the Regionalisation Commission of Gosplan formulated a new zoning methodology grounded in economic specialization and planned production rather than historic imperial borders. Between 1923 and October 1, 1929, all governorates and uezds across the USSR were phased out and replaced by oblasts, okrugs, and raions.

=== Governorates in southwestern and southern provinces ===
In the southwestern and southern borderlands of the Russian Empire, the traditional regimental-hundred administration of the Cossack Hetmanate was phased out between 1781 and 1782 and replaced by imperial governorates. By the late 19th century, these lands were organized into nine standard governorates: Chernigov, Poltava, and Kharkov in Left-Bank and Sloboda Ukraine; Kiev, Podolia, and Volhynia in Right-Bank Ukraine (forming the Southwestern Krai); and Yekaterinoslav, Kherson, and Taurida in the southern territories of Novorossiya. In 1912, the Kholm Governorate was additionally established from eastern borderlands detached from Congress Poland.

During the revolutionary period (1917–1921), the territorial administration underwent several rapid reorganizations. In March 1918, the Central Council of the Ukrainian People's Republic passed legislation to replace governorates with smaller units termed zemli, but Hetman Pavlo Skoropadskyi reinstated the governorate structure following the establishment of the Ukrainian State in April 1918. The Bolshevik administration initially retained the governorates in the Ukrainian SSR, dividing the republic into 12 units before consolidating them into nine in 1922. In June 1925, the Ukrainian SSR abolished the governorate system entirely, transitioning directly to a two-tier structure of 41 okruhas and smaller raions.

== See also ==
- History of the administrative division of Russia
- List of governorates of the Russian Empire
- Oblast
