= Oblast =

First-level administrative division in several countries

An oblast (/ˈɒblɑːst/, US also /ˈoʊblæst/) (Note: Plural: oblasts or oblasti (Russian: области; Ukrainian: області).) (Note: Russian: область [ˈobləsʲtʲ]; Ukrainian: область [ˈɔblɐsʲtʲ]; Belarusian: вобласць, romanized: vobłaść [ˈvɔblasʲt͡sʲ]; Polish: obwód [ˈɔbvut]; Serbian: област, romanized: oblast [ôblaːst]; Bulgarian: област, romanized: oblast [ˈɔbɫɐst]; Macedonian: област, romanized: oblast [ˈɔbɫast]; Kazakh: облыс, romanized: oblys [ˈwobləs]; Kyrgyz: облус, romanized: oblus [ˈoblus]; Bashkir and Tatar: өлкә, romanized: ölkä [øʎˈcɛ]; Iron Ossetic: облæст, romanized: oblæst [ˈobɫɐstʰ]; Tajik and Uzbek: вилоят, romanized: viloyat [wilɒˈjæt].) is a type of administrative division in Russia and several post-Soviet states, including Belarus, Bulgaria and Ukraine. Historically, the term was used in the Russian Empire and the Soviet Union. The word "oblast" is often translated into English as 'region' or 'province'. In some countries, oblasts are also known by the Russian term.

== Etymology ==
The term oblast is borrowed from Russian область (pronounced [ˈobləsʲtʲ]), from where it is inherited from Old Russian, in turn borrowed from Church Slavonic область oblastĭ 'power, empire', formed from the prefix oб- (cognate with Classical Latin ob 'towards, against' and Ancient Greek ἐπί/ἔπι epi 'in power, in charge') and the stem власть vlastǐ 'power, rule'. In Old Russian, it was used alongside оболость obolostǐ—the equivalent of об- 'against' and волость 'territory, state, power' (cognate with English 'wield'; see volost).

== History ==
=== Russian Empire ===
In the Russian Empire oblasts were considered to be administrative units and were included as parts of Governorates General or krais. The majority of then-existing oblasts were on the periphery of the country (e.g. Kars Oblast or Transcaspian Oblast) or covered the areas where Cossacks lived.

=== Soviet Union ===
In the Soviet Union, oblasts were one of the types of administrative divisions of the union republics. As any administrative units of this level, oblasts were composed of districts (raions) and cities/towns directly under oblasts' jurisdiction. Some oblasts also included autonomous entities called autonomous okrugs. Because of the Soviet Union electrification program under the GOELRO plan, Ivan Alexandrov, as director of the Regionalisation Committee of Gosplan, divided the Soviet Union into thirteen European and eight Asiatic oblasts, using rational economic planning rather than "the vestiges of lost sovereign rights".

The names of oblasts did not usually correspond to the names of the respective historical regions, as they were created as purely administrative units. With a few exceptions, Soviet oblasts were named after their administrative centers.

=== Yugoslavia ===
In 1922, the Kingdom of Serbs, Croats and Slovenes was divided into 33 administrative divisions also called oblasts. In 1929, oblasts were replaced with larger administrative units known as banovinas.

During the Yugoslav Wars, several Serb Autonomous Oblasts were formed in Bosnia and Herzegovina and Croatia. These oblasts were later merged into the Republic of Serbian Krajina and the Republika Srpska.

The word "oblast" is also prominent and widely used in Serbian language. Not strictly relating to territory (where it could mean "part of a whole"), It is also regularly used to denote parts of science, literature, or production, and so on (for example "oblast nauke" means "field of science").

== Modern oblasts ==
=== Bulgaria ===
Since 1999, Bulgaria has been divided into 28 oblasts, usually translated as "provinces". Before, the country was divided into just nine units, also called oblasts.

=== Post-Soviet states ===
Territorial entity	Local term	English term	Details	Comment
Armenia	marz	province or region	see: marz (country subdivision)	Oblast in the Russian version of a 1995 law.
Belarus	voblasts (voblasc) / oblast	region	see: regions of Belarus	Belarusian and Russian are both state languages
Kazakhstan	oblys / oblast	region	see: regions of Kazakhstan	Kazakh is the sole state language. Russian is officially used alongside it in state organizations and local self-government bodies according to the Constitution
Kyrgyzstan	oblus / oblast	region	see: regions of Kyrgyzstan	Kyrgyz is the sole state language. Kyrgyz and Russian are both official languages
Russia	oblast	oblast or region	see: oblasts of Russia	According to the Constitution of Russia, oblasts are considered to be subjects of the Federation, which is a higher status than that of administrative units they had within the Russian SFSR before the dissolution of the Soviet Union. The federal subject status gives the oblasts some degree of autonomy and gives them representation in the Federation Council
Tajikistan	viloyat	region	see: regions of Tajikistan	
Turkmenistan	welaýat	region	see: regions of Turkmenistan	
Ukraine	oblast	oblast or region	see: oblasts of Ukraine	In Ukraine, an oblast (Ukrainian: область [ˈɔblɐsʲtʲ]; in English called a province or region) refers to one of the country's 24 primary administrative units. Since Ukraine is a unitary state, the provinces (or regions) do not have much legal scope of competence other than that which is established in the Ukrainian Constitution and by law. Articles 140–146 of Chapter XI of the constitution deal directly with local authorities and their competency. Oblasts are further subdivided into raions (districts), ranging in number from 3 to 10 per entity
Uzbekistan	viloyat	region	see: regions of Uzbekistan	

Viloyat and welaýat are derived from the Turkish-language term vilayet, itself derived from the Arabic-language term wilāya (ولاية).

== See also ==
- Autonomous oblast
- Guberniya, an administrative unit, comparable to an oblast, of the Russian Empire, early Russian SFSR, and the Soviet Union
- Raion, district or sub-division of an oblast
- Krai
- Okrug
- Political divisions of Russia
- Landscape park (protected area), Czech: chráněná krajinná oblast, Slovak: Chránená krajinná oblasť
