= Hugh Lincoln Cooper =

American colonel and civil engineer

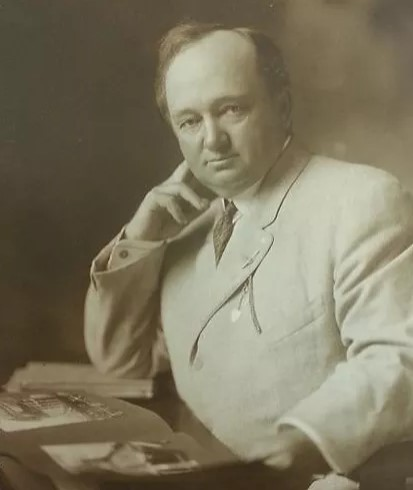
Hugh L. Cooper

Hugh Lincoln Cooper (April 28, 1865–June 24, 1937) was an American colonel and civil engineer, known for construction supervision of a number of hydroelectric power plants.

== Biography ==
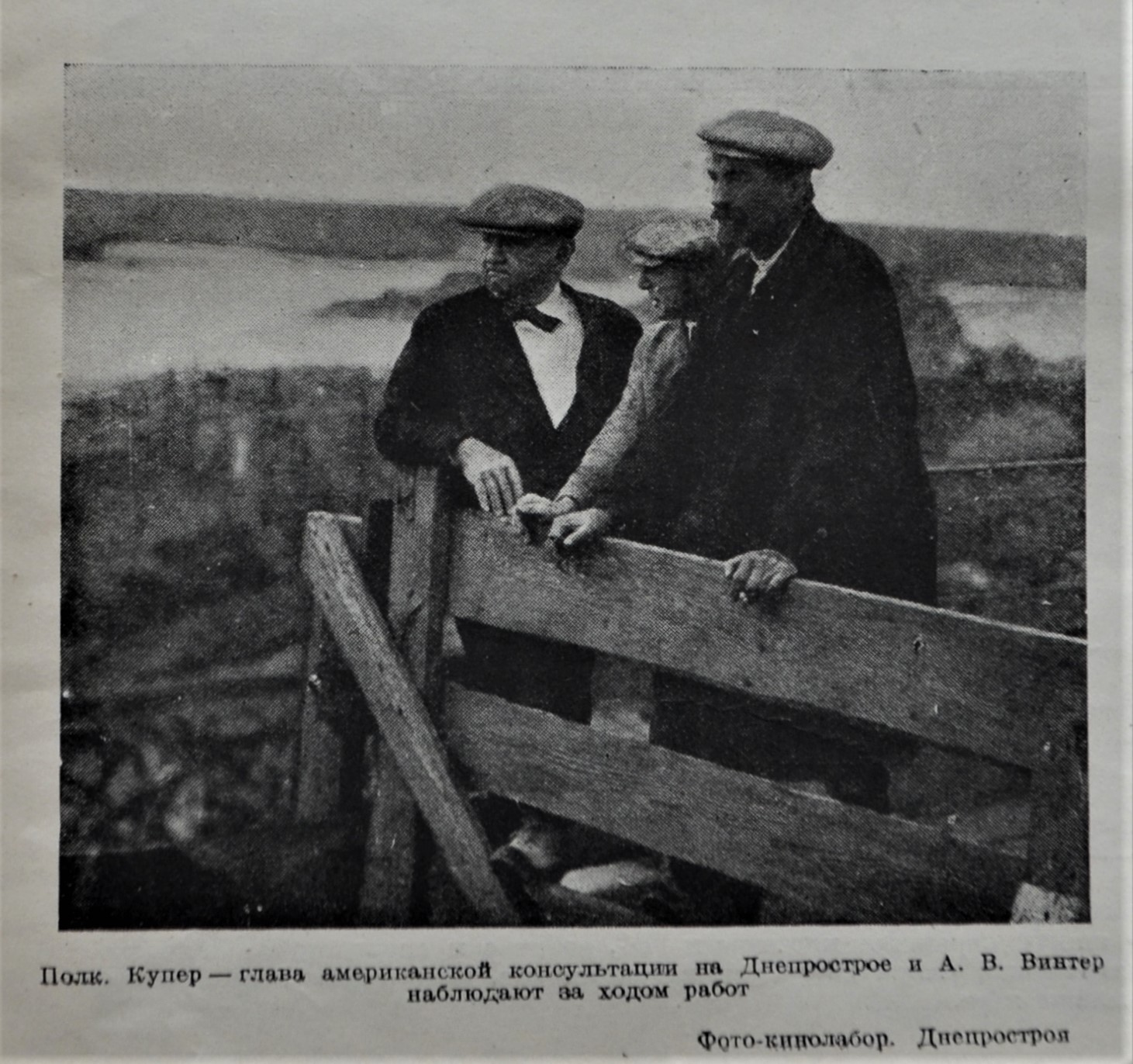
Cooper at left, with Alexander Vasilyevich Vinter, a Russian engineer and construction manager, at right

Born in Houston County in Sheldon, Minnesota, Cooper moved to Rushford Minnesota and graduated from Rushford High School. Cooper was a self-educated civil engineer. He worked throughout the United States, Canada, Brazil, Egypt, and Soviet Union. During World War I he served as a supervising engineer in the US Army Corps of Engineers.

Cooper died in Stamford, Connecticut in 1937.

== Supervised constructions ==
- Toronto Power Generating Station, Niagara Falls, Ontario, Canada (1906)
- Keokuk Dam, Hamilton, Illinois and Keokuk, Iowa (1910-1913)
- Wilson Dam, Florence–Muscle Shoals, Alabama (1918-1924)
- Lake Zumbro Hydroelectric Generating Plant, Mazeppa, Minnesota (1919)
- Dniprohes, Soviet Union (now Zaporizhzhia, Ukraine) (1927-1932) — upon completion of the project, Hugh Cooper was awarded Order of the Red Banner of Labour
