= Dnieper Hydroelectric Station =

Hydroelectric power plant in Zaporizhzhia, Ukraine

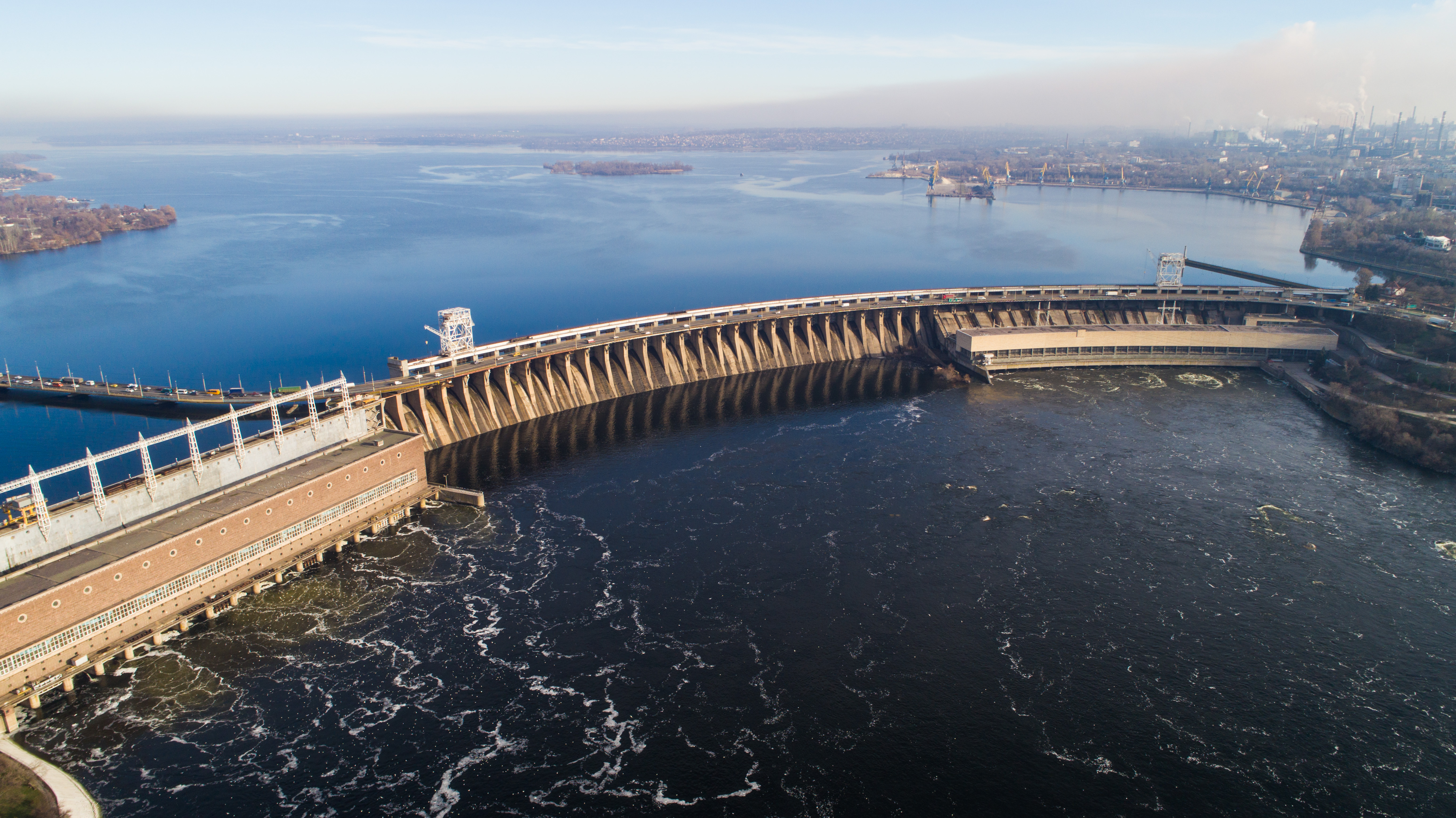

- Location of the Dnieper Hydroelectric Station in Zaporizhzhia Oblast, Ukraine
- Official name: ДніпроГЕС
- Country: Ukraine
- Location: Zaporizhzhia
- Coordinates: 47°52′09″N 35°05′13″E
- Status: Not operational
- Construction began: 1927

Dam and spillways
- Impounds: Dnieper river
- Height: 60 m (200 ft)
- Length: 760 m (2,490 ft)
- Spillway capacity: 20,250 m^{3}/s (715,000 cu ft/s)

Reservoir
- Active capacity: 3.3 km^{3} (2,700,000 acre⋅ft)

Power Station
- Operator: Ukrhydroenergo
- Type: Run-of-the-river
- Hydraulic head: 37.5 m (123 ft)
- Installed capacity: 1,578.6 MW
- Annual generation: 3.0 TWh (11 PJ) (2013–2017)

The Dnieper Hydroelectric Station (Ukrainian: ДніпроГЕС, romanized: DniproHES), also known as the Dnipro Dam, is a hydroelectric power station in the city of Zaporizhzhia, Ukraine. Operated by Ukrhydroenergo, it is the fifth and largest station in the Dnieper reservoir cascade, a series of hydroelectric stations on the Dnieper river that supply power to the Donets–Kryvyi Rih industrial region. Its dam has a length of 760 metres (2,490 ft), a height of 60 metres (200 ft).

The dam elevates the Dnieper river by 37.5 metres (123 ft) and maintains the water level of the Dnieper Reservoir, which has a volume of 3.3 km^{3} and stretches 129 kilometres (80 mi) upstream to the nearby city of Dnipro. The reservoir's two shipping canals—the disused original one with three staircase locks and a newer one with one staircase lock—allow ships to bypass the dam at its eastern end and sail upstream as far as the Pripyat River. A highway on the dam and bridge over the shipping canals enable vehicles to cross the Dnieper.

The electric station was built by the Soviet Union from 1927 to 1932. After being destroyed during World War II to make it harder for advancing German forces to cross the river and to hamstring their occupation by removing 19% of regional network capacity, it was rebuilt from 1944 to 1950. An expansion built from 1969 to 1980 quadrupled the station's output, with further modernization renovations conducted in the 1990s. In 2024, after being hit by Russian missiles, power output at the Dnieper Hydroelectric Station came to a halt.

== History ==
=== Early plans ===
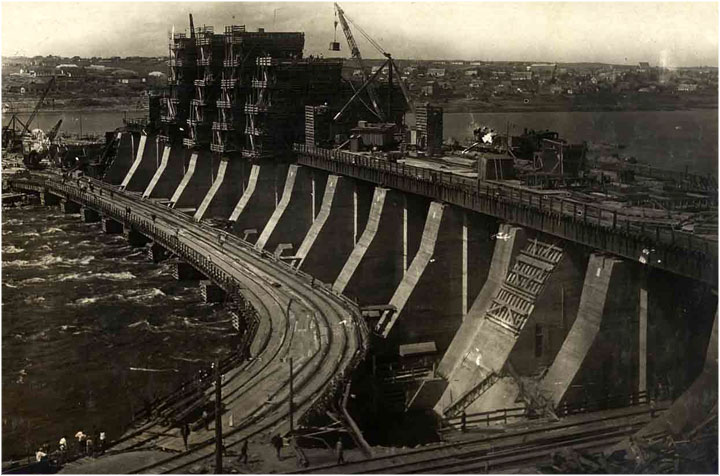
The dam under construction in 1934

In the lower reaches of the Dnieper River, there was an almost 100-kilometre (62 mi)-long stretch that was filled with the Dnieper Rapids. This is approximately the distance between the modern cities Dnipro and Zaporizhzhia. During the 19th century, engineers worked on the projects to make the river navigable. Projects for flooding the rapids were proposed by N. Lelyavsky in 1893, V. Timonov in 1894, S. Maximov and Genrikh Graftio in 1905, A. Rundo and D. Yuskevich in 1910, I. Rozov and L. Yurgevich in 1912, Mohylko.

While the main objective of these projects was to improve navigation, hydroelectric power generation was developed concurrently, in terms of the "utilization of the freely flowing water". G. Graftio's 1905 project included three dams with a small area of flooding.

=== GOELRO plan and construction, 1921–1941 ===
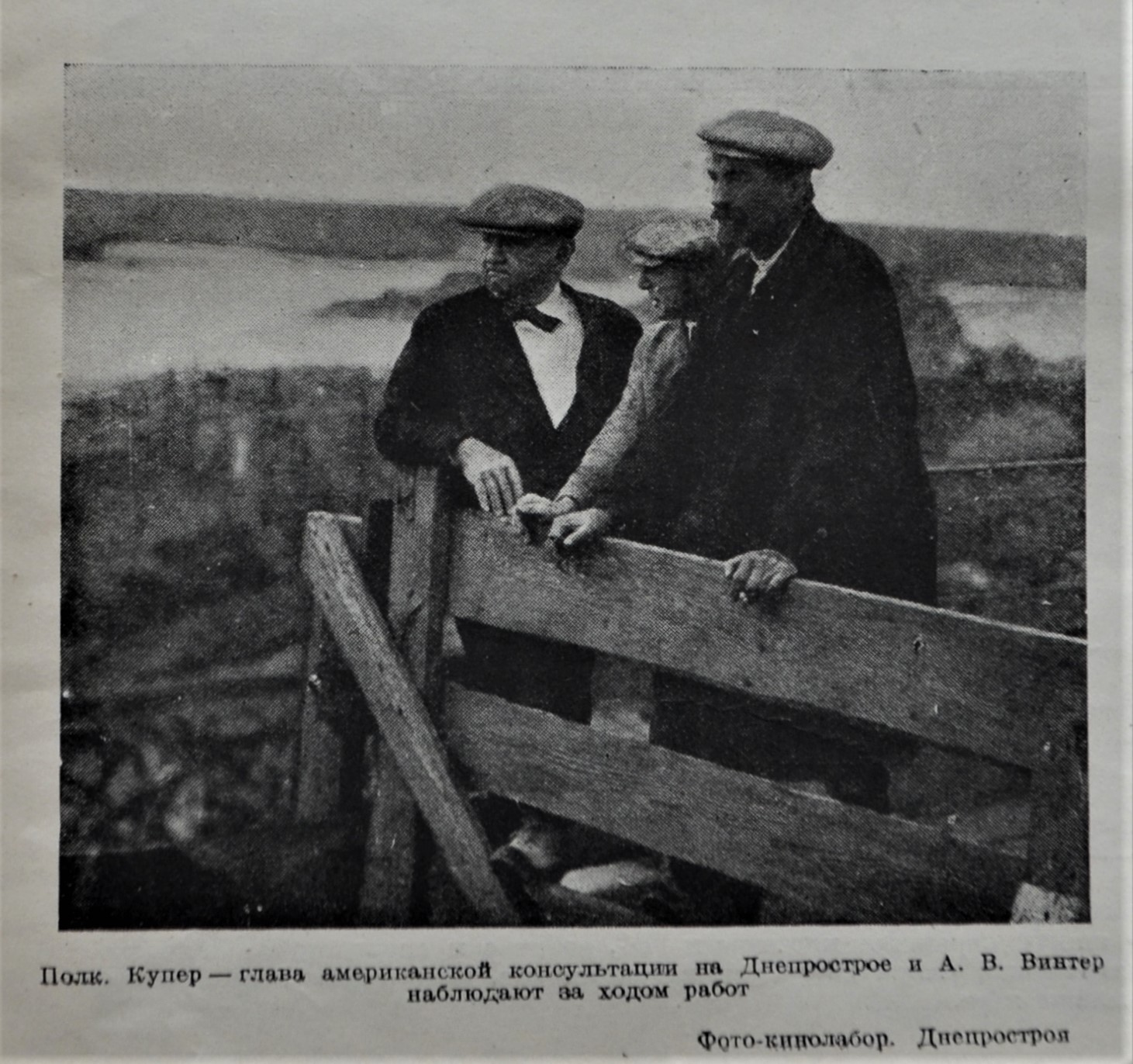
Colonel Cooper, on the left, the head of consultants and Alexander Vinter, The Dnieper Hydroelectric Station construction manager.

The Dneprostroi Dam was built on vacated land in the countryside at the old river crossing known as Kichkas just north of Khortytsia island. The reason for building it was to stimulate Soviet industrialization. A special company was formed called Dniprobud or Dneprostroi (hence the dam's alternative name) that later built other dams on the Dnieper and exists to this day. The design for the dam that was accepted dates back to the USSR GOELRO electrification plan which was adopted in the early 1920s. The station was designed by a group of engineers headed by Prof. Ivan Alexandrov, a chief expert of GOELRO, who later became a head of the RSFSR State Planning Commission. The station was planned to provide electricity for several aluminium production plants and a high quality iron and steel plant that were also to be constructed in the area.

The DniproHES project used the experience gained from the construction of the Sir Adam Beck Hydroelectric Power Stations at Niagara Falls, Ontario, the Hydroelectric Island Maligne, Quebec, and the La Gabelle Generating Station on the St. Maurice River. On 17 September 1932, the Soviet government awarded six American engineers (including Hugh Cooper, William V. Murphy, and G. Thompson, engineers of General Electric) with the Order of the Red Banner of Labour for "the outstanding work in the construction of DniproHES".

Soviet industrialization was accompanied by a wide propaganda effort. Leon Trotsky, by then out of power, campaigned for the idea within the ruling Politburo in early 1926. In a speech to the Komsomol youth movement, he said:

In the south the Dnieper runs its course through the wealthiest industrial lands; and it is wasting the prodigious weight of its pressure, playing over age-old rapids and waiting until we harness its stream, curb it with dams, and compel it to give lights to cities, to drive factories, and to enrich ploughland. We shall compel it!

The dam and its buildings were designed by the constructivist architects Viktor Vesnin and Nikolai Kolli. Construction began in 1927, and the plant started to produce electricity in October 1932. Generating about 560 MW, the station became the largest Soviet power plant at the time and the third-largest in the world, following the Hoover Dam, 705 MW, and the Wilson Dam, 663 MW, in the United States.

American specialists under the direction of Col. Hugh Cooper took part in the construction. The first five giant power generators were manufactured by the General Electric. During the second five-year plan, four more generators of similar power that were produced by Elektrosila in Leningrad were installed. The energy produced by the power plant was used by the Dnepropetrovsk Aluminum Plant, which was one of the largest in the USSR and was critical to the Soviet aviation industry.

=== World War II and post-war reconstruction ===
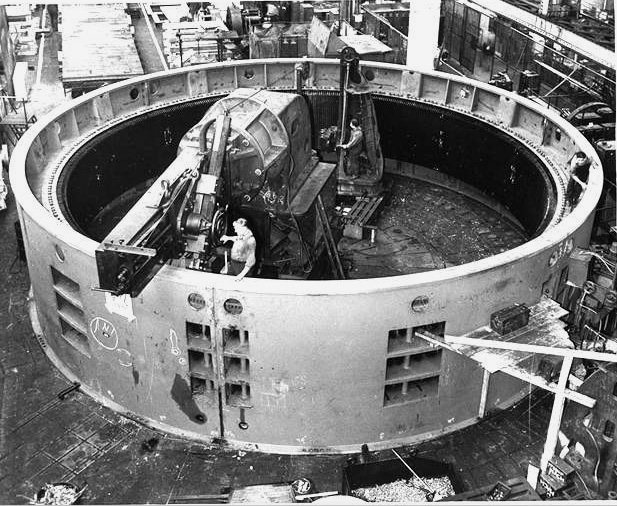
Milling of the Dneprostroi Dam generators at General Electric

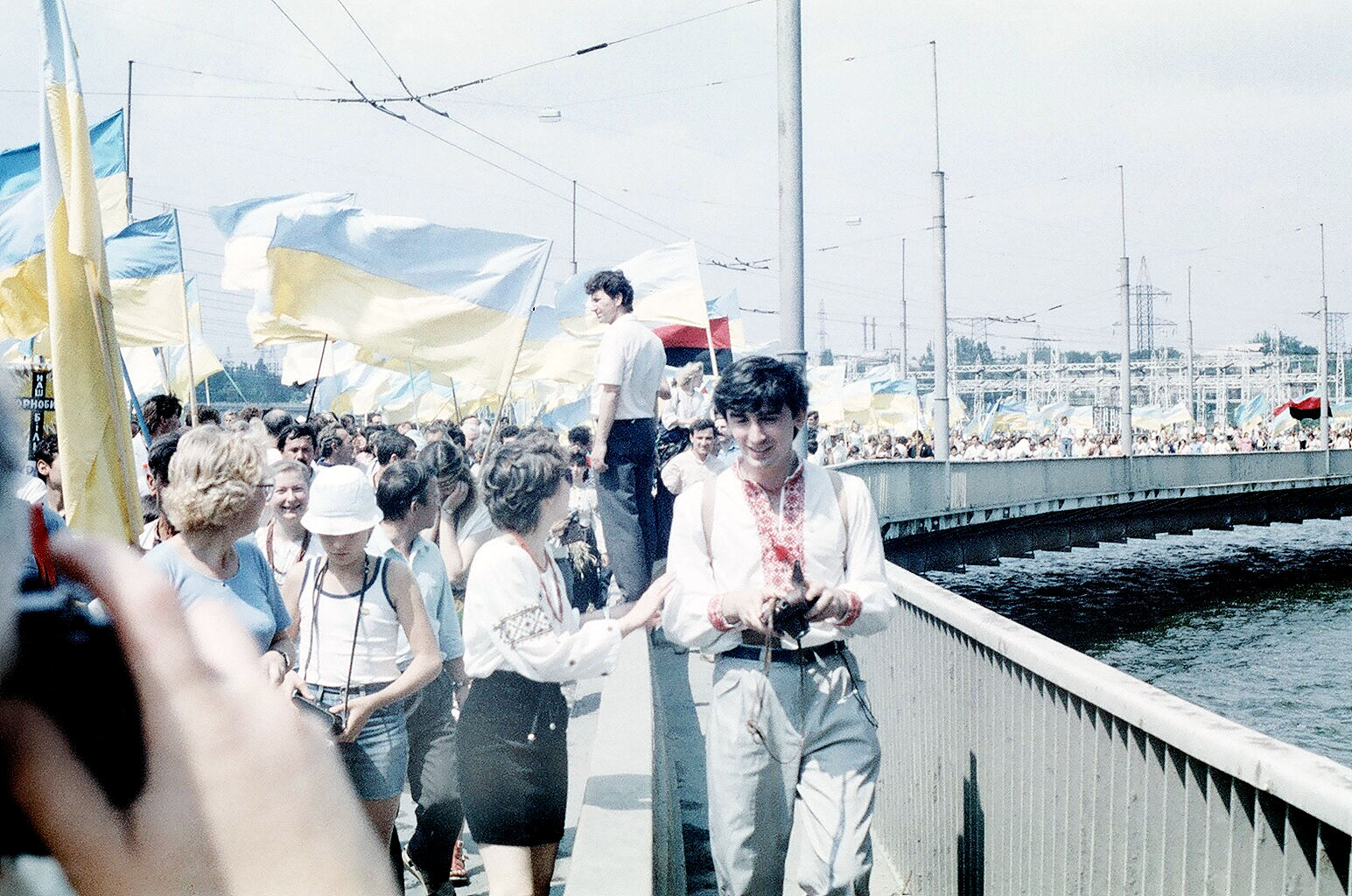
A march through the Dnipro Dam in 1990, organized by pro-independence People's Movement of Ukraine

During World War II, the strategically important dam and plant were dynamited by retreating Red Army troops in 1941 after Germany's invasion of the Soviet Union. American journalist H. R. Knickerbocker wrote that year:

The Russians have proved now by their destruction of the great dam at Dniepropetrovsk that they mean truly to scorch the earth before Hitler even if it means the destruction of their most precious possessions ... Dnieprostroy was an object almost of worship to the Soviet people. Its destruction demonstrates a will to resist which surpasses anything we had imagined. I know what that dam meant to the Bolsheviks ... It was the largest, most spectacular, and most popular of all the immense projects of the First Five-Year Plan ... The Dnieper Dam when it was built was the biggest on earth and so it occupied a place in the imagination and affection of the Soviet people difficult for us to realize ... Stalin's order to destroy it meant more to the Russians emotionally than it would mean to us for Roosevelt to order the destruction of the Panama Canal.

The resulting flood killed between 20,000 and 100,000 civilians, along with Red Army officers crossing the river at the time. Ukrainian historian Volodymyr Linnikov claims that such numbers are exaggerated and the real death toll is closer to 3,000, as was reported in the contemporary German press. While a second attempt at dynamiting the dam by retreating German troops in 1943 was averted by Soviet scouts, who cut the wire that was supposed to detonate the explosives, the dam remained extensively damaged.

General Electric shipped three new 90 MW generators for the dam in 1946, replacing the 77.5 MW generators destroyed during World War II. Each generator weighed over 1,021 tonnes and had a frame diameter of 12.93 metres (42.4 ft). The reconstruction of the dam started in 1944, and power generation was restarted in 1947, with completion in 1950. A second powerhouse was built from 1969 to 1980, expanding production capacity by 1,538.2 MW.

=== Independent Ukraine ===
The reconstruction of the power plant started in 1996 and was supported by the European Bank for Reconstruction and Development and the Swiss Government. As a result of this, the capacity of the plant increased by 42 MW. The second stage of the reconstruction started in 2007 and, as of 2020, was ongoing.

In the spring of 2016, all communist symbols (including the sign that stated that the dam was named after Vladimir Lenin) were removed from the dam in order to comply with decommunization laws.

Beginning in October 2022, Russia launched a series of attacks on Ukrainian energy infrastructure, including the Dnipro dam. It was critically damaged during an attack that occurred on 22 March 2024, the dam and its power station was struck by eight missiles. The attack caused damage to the dam's structure, although officials said there was no risk of a breach. The head of the Ukrainian state-owned energy company Ukrhydroenergo, Ihor Syrota, said that the Hydroelectric Power Station-2 (HPS-2), one of the dam's two power stations, was in critical condition after being struck directly by two missiles, damaging crane girders and a support pillar. A trolleybus travelling along the dam's roadway was also struck, setting it on fire and forcing the closure of the dam to motorists. One person was reported to have been killed in the attack. The attack led to the station losing a third of its generation capacity and Hr 159,305 ($4,100) in damage to water resources, as well as a suspension of water intake in Bilenke, downstream from the dam. Ukrhydroenergo said that restoration works on the dam would take "years". Environmental damage caused by the attack was estimated to be at least $3.5 million.

On 12 April 2024, the dam caught on fire as a result of drone strikes launched by Russia. The fire caused around half a tonne of oil products leaking into the Dnieper River. The facility was again left in a "critical state" and did not generate any energy following another Russian attack on 1 June. By March 2025, Russians had launched 46 strikes against the power plant.

== Power generation ==
As of 2021, the Dnieper HES-1 had nine turbines, each generating 72 MW, as well as a smaller one generating 2.6 MW for the power plant's own needs. The Dnieper HES-2, which was constructed in 1969–1980, had six turbines generating around 120 MW, and two that generated 104.5 MW.

== Gallery ==
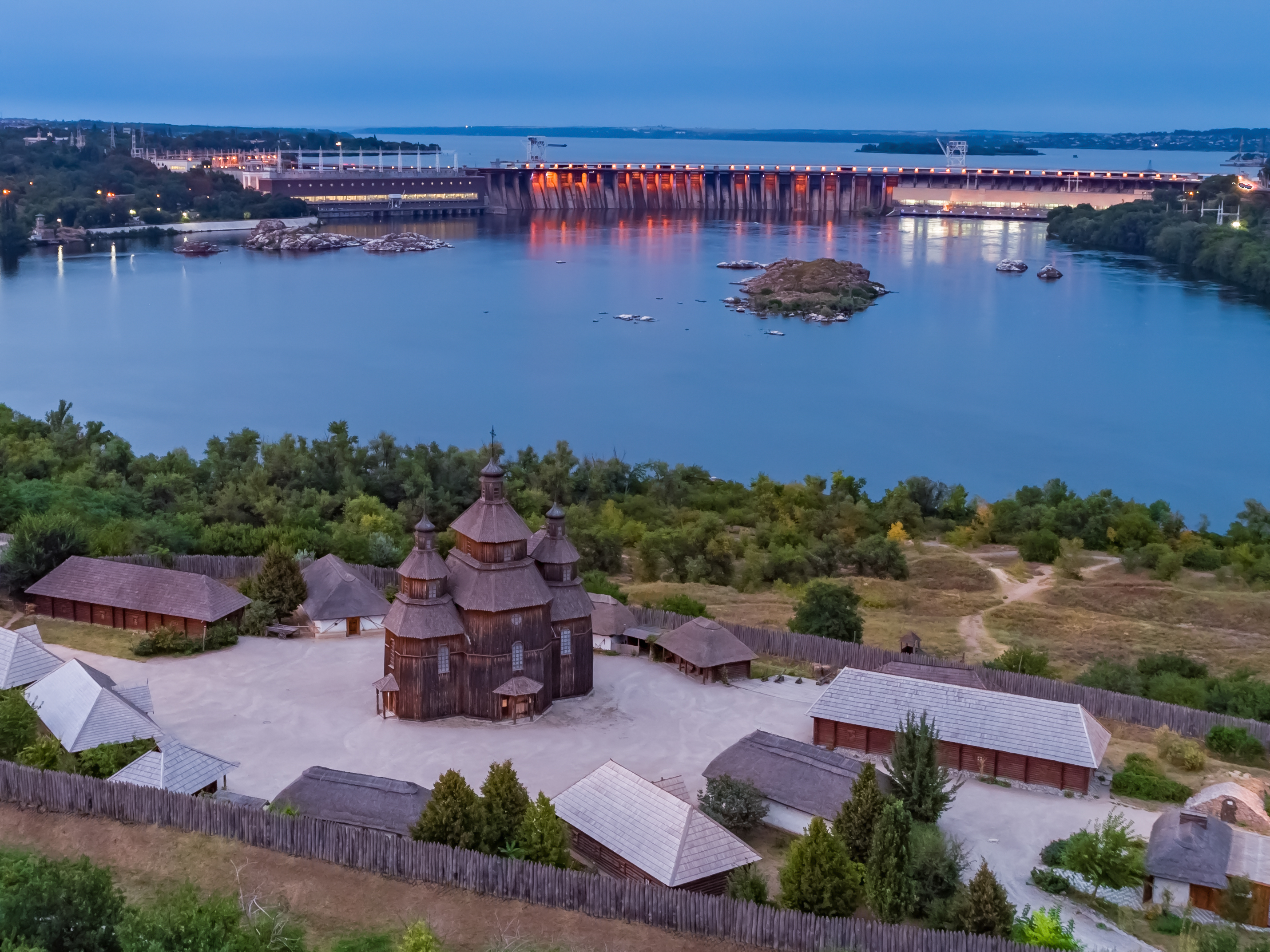
Dnieper Hydroelectric Station (dam and power station), Zaporizhzhia

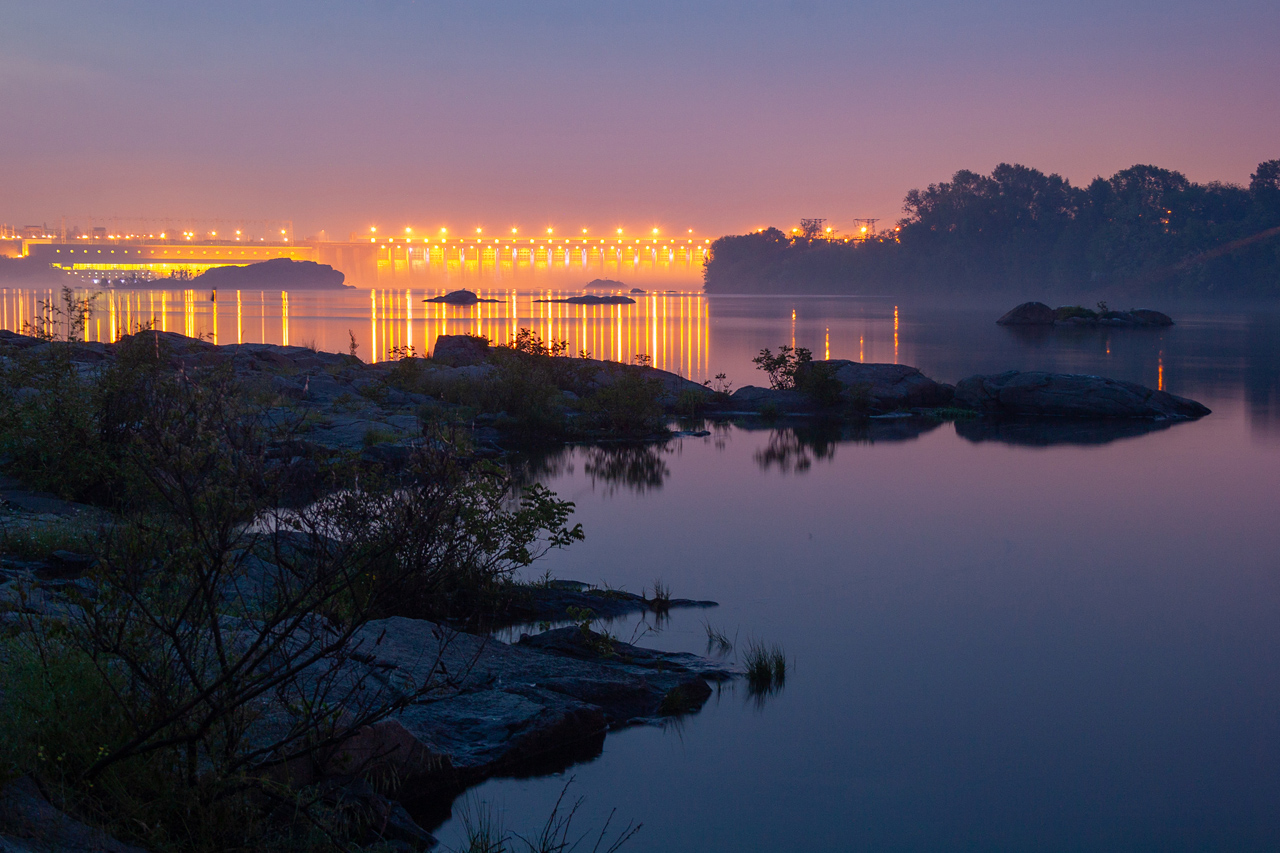
Dnieper Hydroelectric Station view from Khortytsya

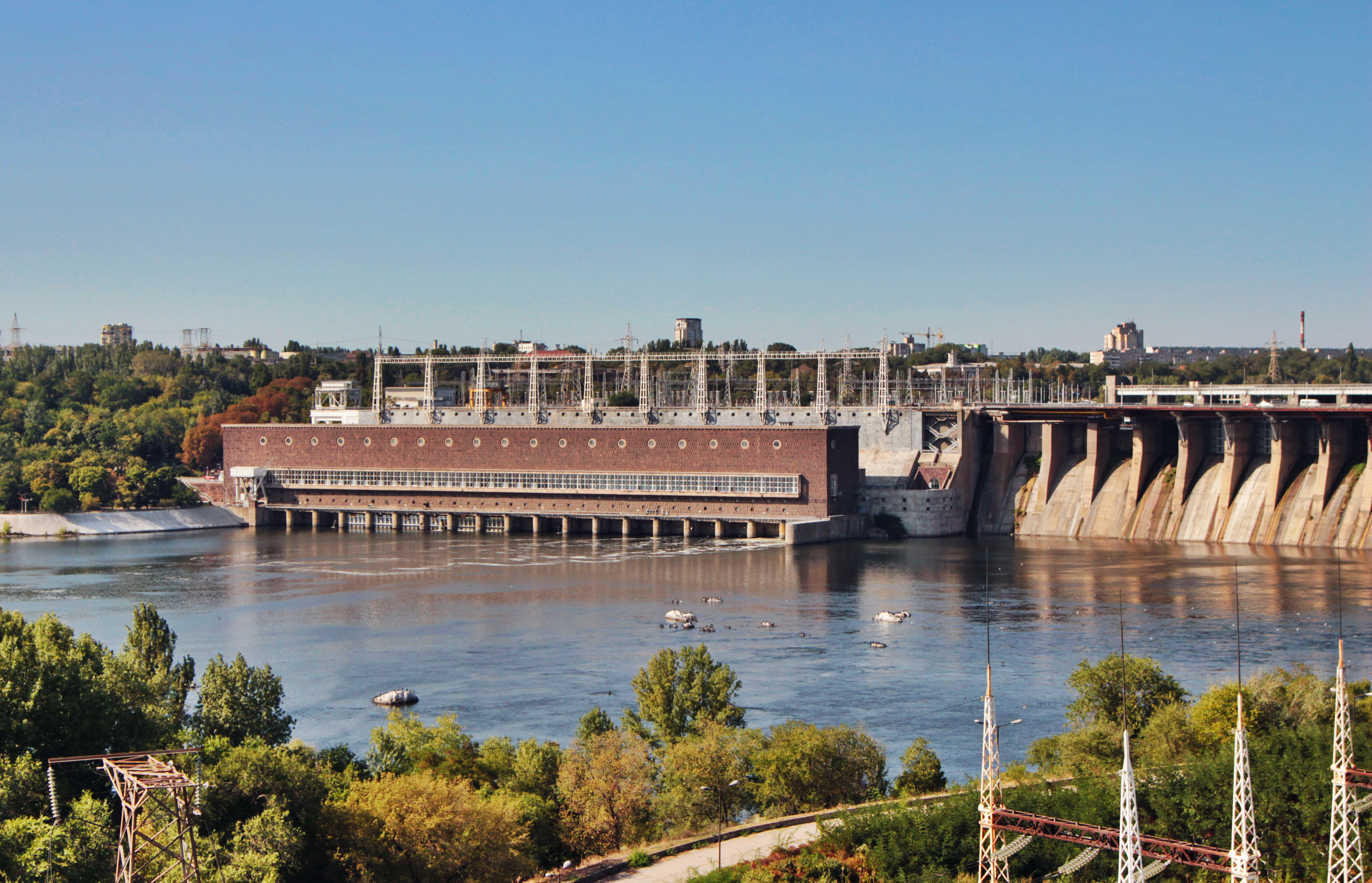
Dnieper Hydroelectric Station (dam and power station)

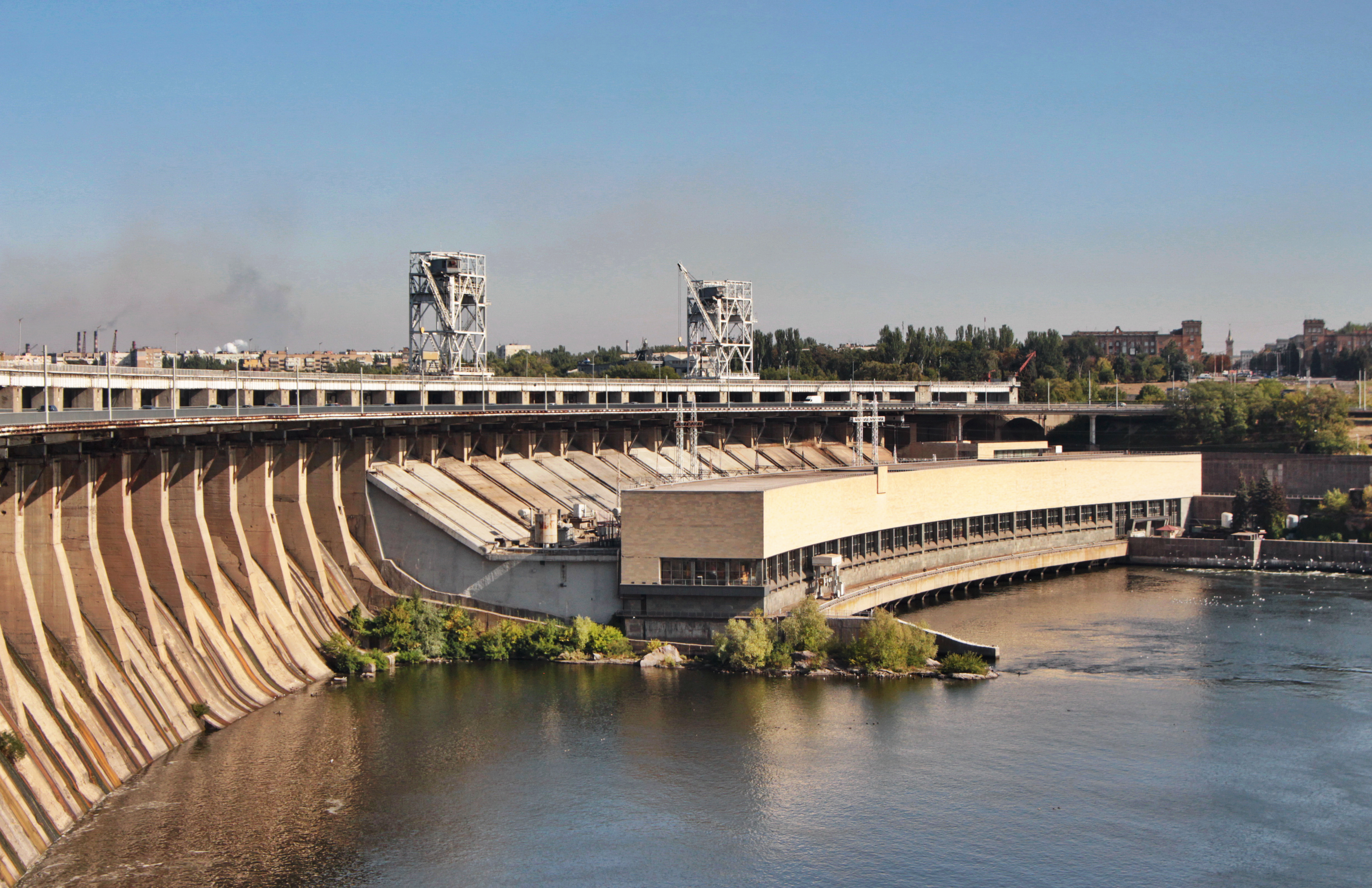
Dnieper Hydroelectric Station (dam and power station)

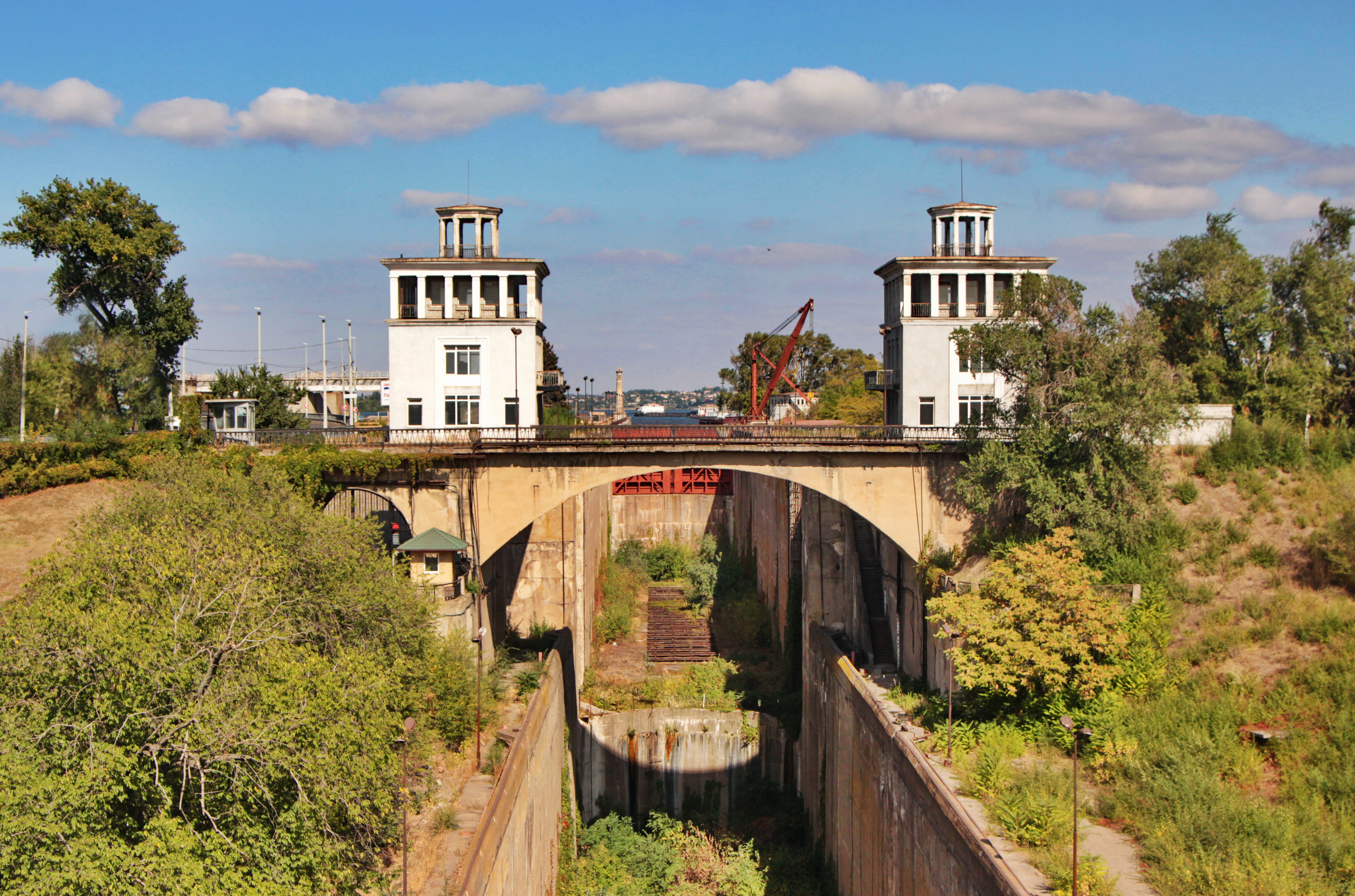
Dnipro Lock, architects V. O. Vesnin, G. M. Orlov, Zaporizhzhia

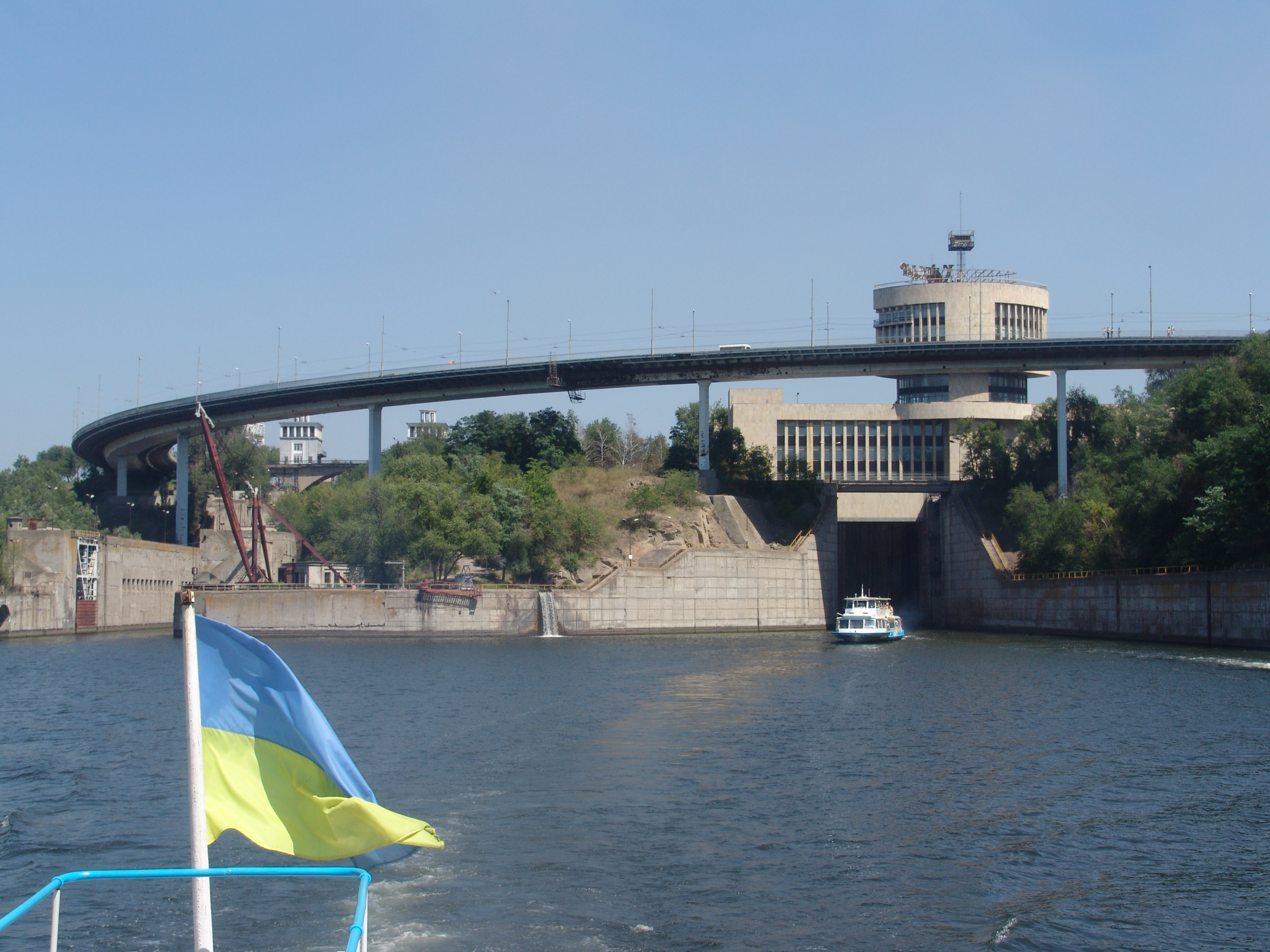
Zaporizhzhia. Dnipro. New Lock

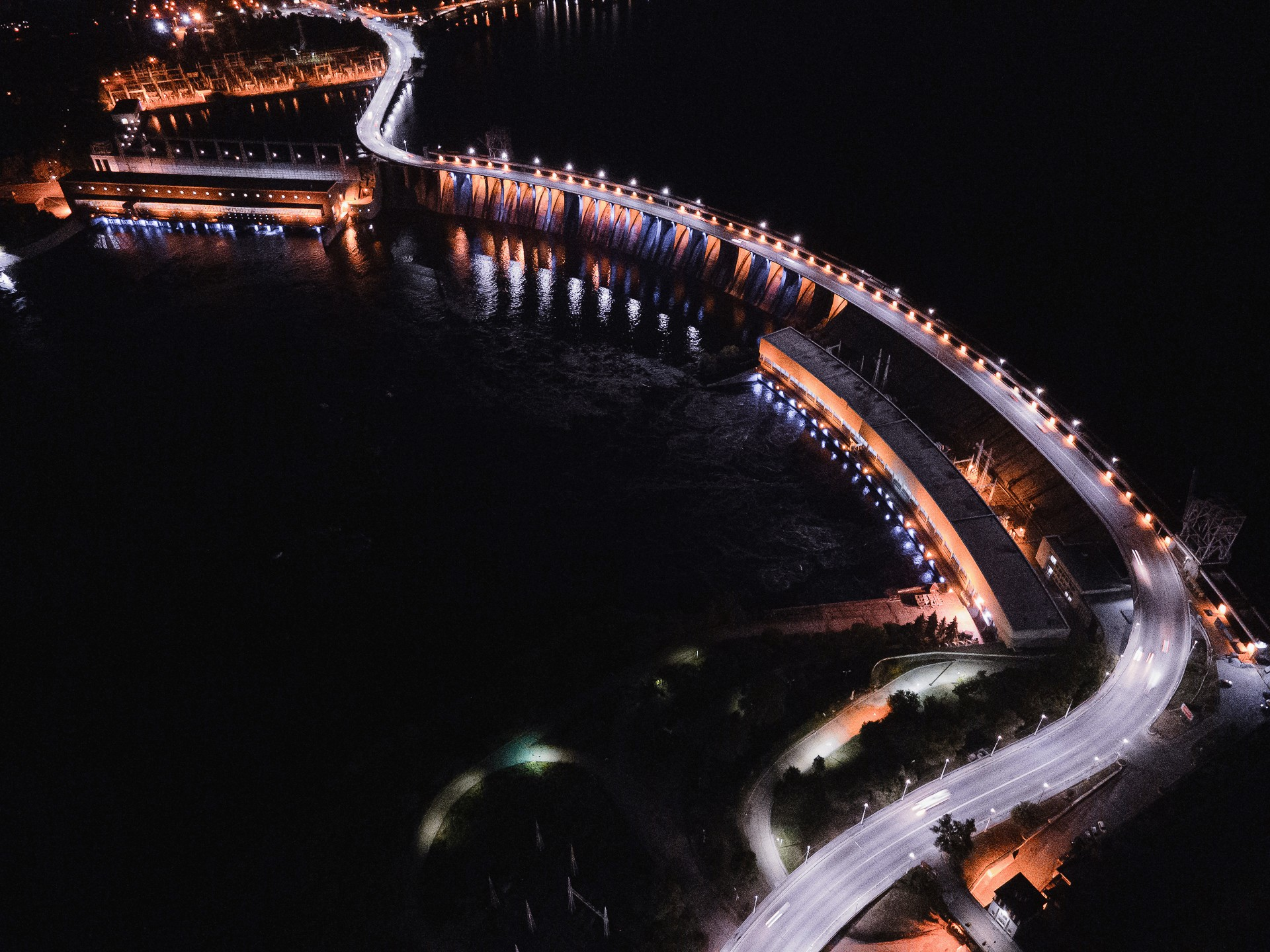
Aerial view Dnieper Hydroelectric Station

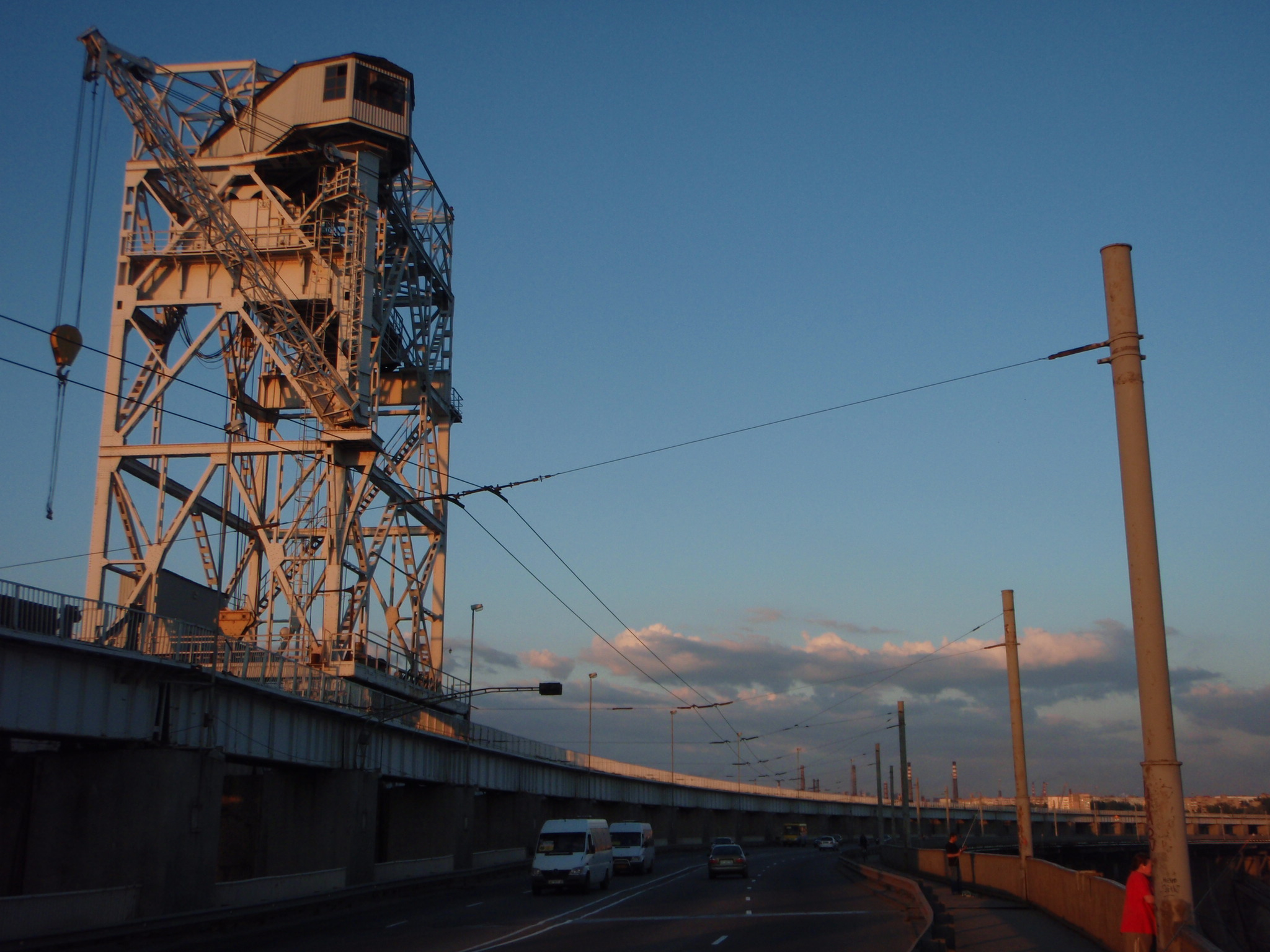
Roadway on Dnieper Hydroelectric Station dam

== See also ==
- Eighth All-Ukrainian Congress of Soviets
- Hydroelectricity in Ukraine
- List of power stations in Ukraine
- Zaporizhzhia Pylon Triple
- Destruction of the Kozarovytska Dam
- Destruction of the Kakhovka Dam
