= Grigory Dubelir =

Russian transport engineer and urban planner

Grigory Dmitrievich Dubelir (August 20 (September 1) 1874–1942) was a Soviet transport engineer and urban planner.

== GOELRO ==
He was one of the eight experts appointed to lead the 200 scientists gathered in February 1920 in the "State Commission for Electrification of Russia" (GOELRO).
