= Karl Krug (electrical engineer) =

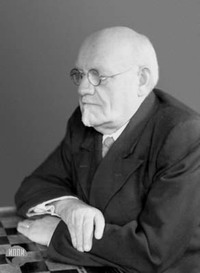
Karl Krug

Karl Adolfovich Krug (1873 Nemyriv – 1 April 24, 1952, Moscow) was a prominent Russian electrical engineer of Baltic German origin. He is credited with founding electrical engineering in Russia having established the All Union Electrical Engineering Institute in Moscow which became one of the biggest scientific research centres in Europe.

== GOELRO ==
He was one of the eight experts appointed to lead the 200 scientists gathered in February 1920 into the "State Commission for Electrification of Russia" (GOELRO).
