= Boris Ugrimov =

Russian electrical engineer

Boris Ivanovich Ugrimov (Russian: Борис Иванович Угримов; 16 October 1872 [O.S. 28 October] – 10 May 1941) was a Russian electrical engineer who played a significant role in the development of electrification in the Soviet Union.

== Early years ==
Boris was the elder brother of Alexander Ugrimov (1874-1974) who became president of the Moscow Society for Agriculture before the Bolshevik seizure of power in October 1917. Ugrimov graduated from the Imperial Moscow Technical School in 1897.

== GOELRO ==
Boris Ugrumov was one of the eight people appointed to lead the development of GOELRO, the State Commission for Electrification of Russia established on 27 February, 1920. He represented the People's Commissariat of Agriculture.
