= Alexander Vinter =

Russian-Soviet scientist

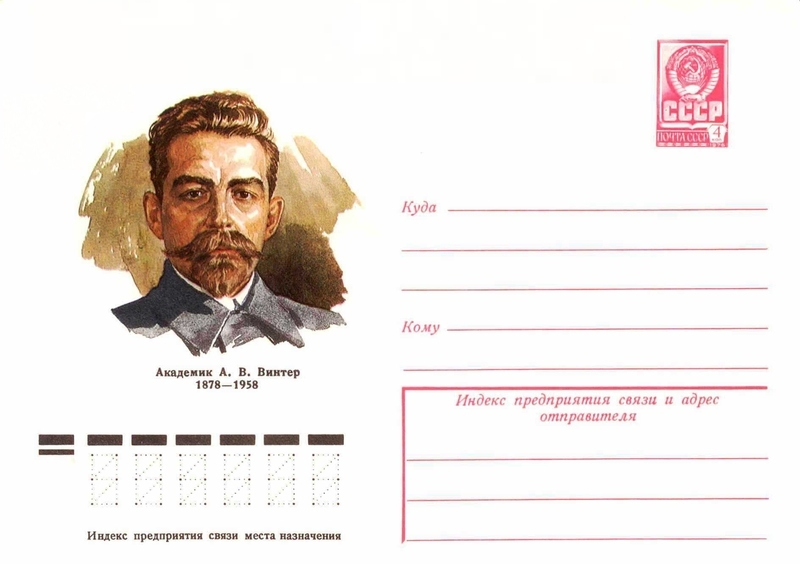
- Soviet envelope featuring a portrait of Alexander Vinter
- Born: Wilhelm-Alexander Vinter; 10 October 1878; Starosielce, Belostoksky Uyezd, Grodno Governorate, Russian Empire
- Died: 9 March 1958 (aged 79); Moscow, Soviet Union
- Education: Peter the Great St. Petersburg Polytechnic University
- Engineering career
- Discipline: Power plant engineering
- Institutions: Academy of Sciences of the Soviet Union
- Projects: Dnieper Hydroelectric Station

Alexander Vasilievich Vinter (Russian: Алекса́ндр Васи́льевич Ви́нтер; 10 October [O.S. 28 September] 1878 – 9 March 1958) was a Russian Soviet scientist and engineer specializing in the field of construction and operation of power plants.

== Biography ==
=== Early life and work ===
Alexander Vinter was born in the family of Friedrich-Wilhem Winter, a Prussian citizen who was a train operator in Russia. When baptized according to the Lutheran rite, he received the double name Wilhelm-Alexander, being registered as a Prussian subject by the citizenship of his father, he was transferred to Russian citizenship later in life. His encounter with the steam engine system permanently directed his attention towards the development and extraction of steam power from early childhood. He graduated from the railway school in Kozyatyn, studied at the Kyiv real school. In 1892, the family moved to Białystok, where he graduated from 7 classes of a real school.

From 1898 he studied at the Kyiv Polytechnic Institute, but for his participation in the student riots of 1900 he was expelled from the institute and was under arrest in Lukyanivka for four months. After his release, he was transferred to work at a steam power plant in Baku. In 1905, he became the head of the operation of the power station "Bely gorod", from which the transmission of 20 kV was developed for the first time in Russia. He worked on the saturated power supply of Baku and Grozny. While in Baku, he twice tried to resume his studies at the Kyiv Polytechnic Institute, but his political background remained an obstacle. Only in 1907, with the help of Professor M. A. Shatelen, dean of the electromechanical department of St. Petersburg Polytechnic Institute, was accepted to this department.

=== Construction of Shatura Plant and Dneprostroy ===
1915, Vinter was invited to build the Vladimir Gunpowder Factory in Moscow Governorate. After the October Revolution of 1917, Winter was appointed head of the construction of the Shatura District Power Plant, which operated on peatlands. In 1918, Winter was appointed manager of Elektrobuda — the Department of Electrical Engineering Facilities for the construction of district power plants. He founded the Central Electrotechnical Council at Elektrobud, which included Gleb Krzhizhanovsky, I. G. Alexandrov, Genrikh Graftio, and R. E. Klasson. In April 1919, he reported to the chairman of the People's Commissar Vladimir Lenin about the formation of 4 construction departments in Svirsky, Volkhovsky, Shatursky and Kashirsky.

From 1927 to 1932, Vinter was the head of the Dneprostroy. At the same time, he headed the construction and installation of factories at the Dneprovsky industrial complex. In 1930, in connection with the successful progress of construction, Vinter was appointed at the same time the head of the construction of all civilian facilities of the Dneprovsky industrial plant, and soon he was in charge of the installation of the plant's plants. In June 1932, Vinter was appointed deputy People's Commissar of Heavy Industry.

=== Later state and scientific activity ===
From 1927 to 1934, Vinter took part in compiling the "Technical Encyclopedia" in 26 volumes, edited by Ludwig Martens. In 1932, Vinter was elected a full member of the Academy of Sciences of the USSR. He studied the country's energy resources, dealt with the issues of rationalizing the structure of the energy systems of the USSR, the problem of increasing the utilization rates of the main equipment of power plants. In addition, he took part in the consideration of projects for the construction of the Kuibyshev and Volgograd hydroelectric power stations.

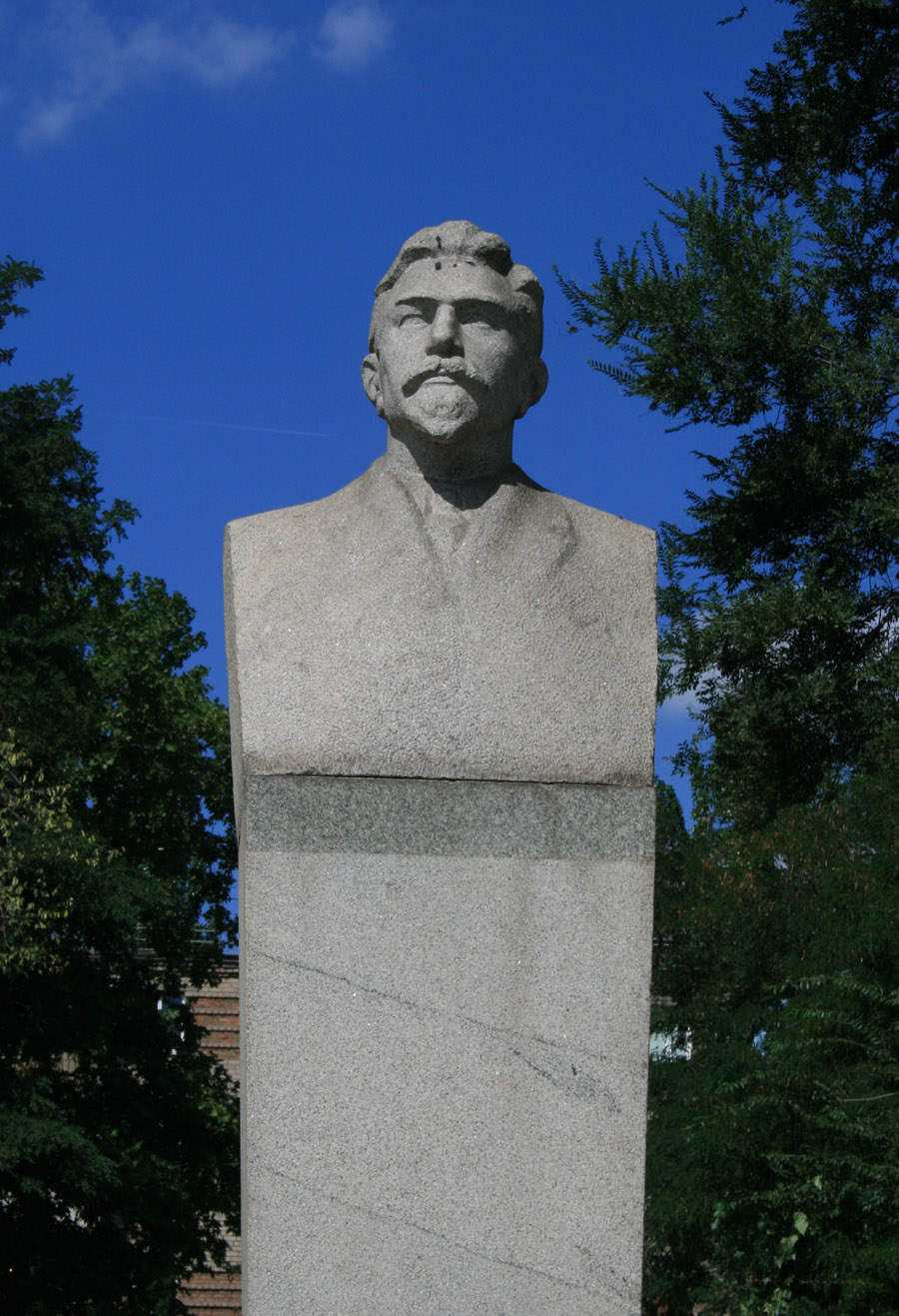
Monument of Alexander Vinter in Zaporizhzhia

During the Second World War Vinter was in Kuibyshev, organizing the construction of temporary power plants. In 1943, he was appointed one of the leaders of the technical council of the Ministry of Power Plants of the Soviet Union, and from 1944 to 1949 he was deputy director of the Energy Institute. Vinter participated in the development of the development of the productive forces of Eastern Siberia. He paid special attention to the Angarsk cascade of hydroelectric power stations. He came to the place of future construction and participated in the selection of the alignment of the first Irkutsk hydroelectric power station.
