= Mikhail Lapirov-Skoblo =

Mikhail Yakovlevich Lapirov-Skoblo (1889 Vitebsk - 1947) was a Russian electrical engineer.

== GOELRO ==
He was one of the eight experts appointed to lead the 200 scientists gathered in February 1920 into the "State Commission for Electrification of Russia" (GOELRO)
