= GOELRO =

1920 Soviet economic development plan

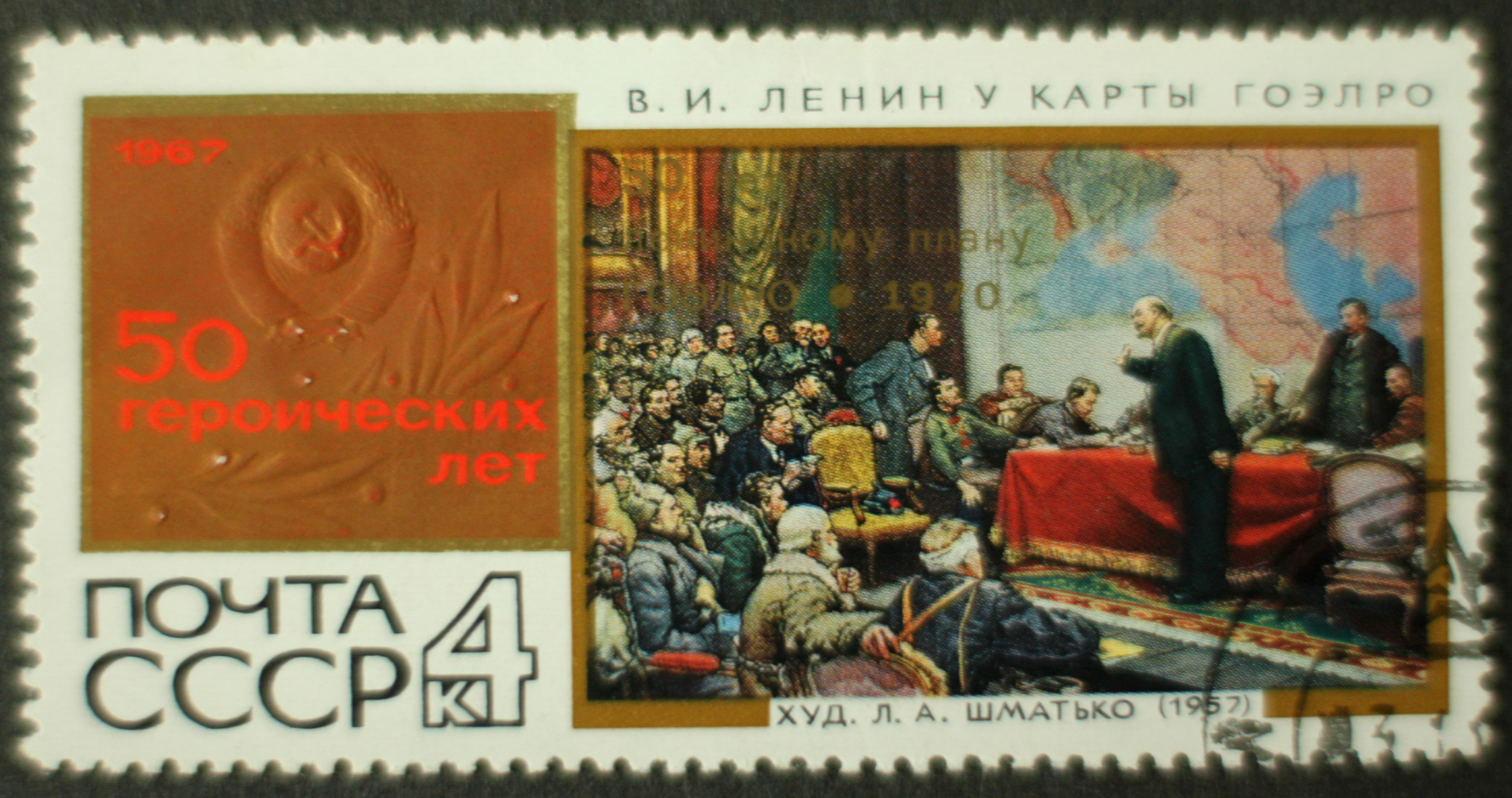
A postage stamp (1967) with the painting “Lenin by the GOELRO map” (1957)

GOELRO (Russian: ГОЭЛРО) was the first of Soviet Russia's plans for national economic recovery and development. It became the prototype for subsequent Five-Year Plans drafted by Gosplan. GOELRO is the transliteration of the Russian abbreviation for "State Commission for Electrification of Russia" (Russian: Государственная комиссия по электрификации России, romanized: Gosudarstvennaya komissiya po elektrifikatsii Rossii).

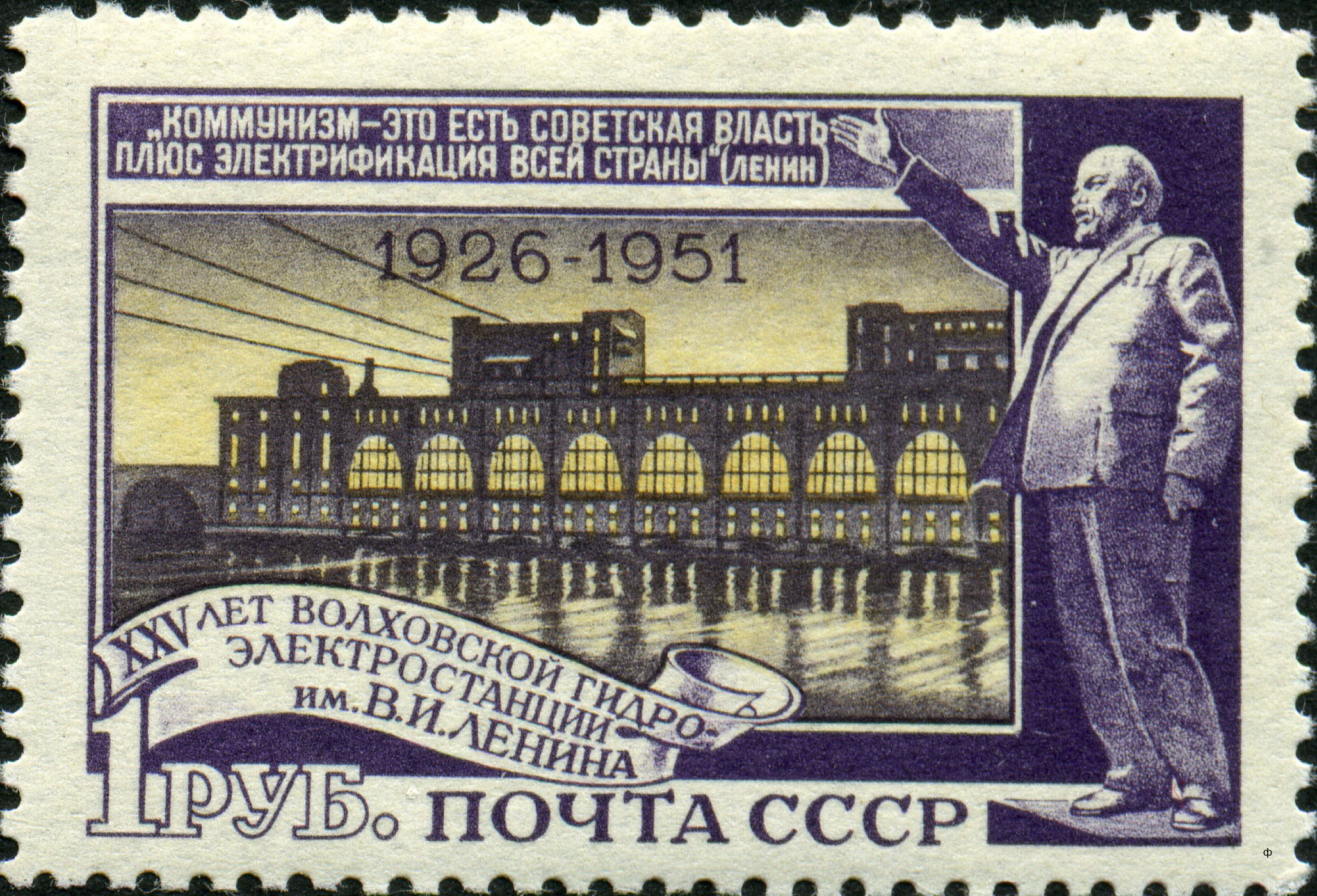
1951 stamp commemorating the 25th anniversary of Volkhov Hydroelectric Station; it quotes Lenin's famous statement on electrification.

The Commission and Plan were initiated and supervised by Vladimir Lenin. Lenin's belief in the central importance of electrification to the achievement of communism is represented by his statement:

Communism is Soviet power plus the electrification of the whole country.

— Vladimir Lenin

== Foundation ==
The commission was established by the Presidium of the VSNKh on February 21, 1920, in accordance with February 3, 1920, VTsIK resolution on the electrification plan development. The director of the commission was Gleb Krzhizhanovsky.

Member	Dates	Organisation
Gleb Krzhizhanovsky	(1872-1959)	ETO
Alexander Kogan	(1865-1929)	TsES (Central Electrotechnical Council)
Boris Ugrimov	(1872-1941)	People's Commissariat of Agriculture
Grigory Dubelir	(1874-1942)	Elektrostroi
Genrikh Graftio	(1869-1949)	Railway electrification
Karl Krug	(1873-1952)	Heating Committee
Mikhail Lapirov-Skoblo	(1889-1947)	
Boris Stunkel	(1882-1937)	Glavtekstil

About 200 scientists and engineers participated, including Genrikh Graftio, Ivan Alexandrov, Mikhail Shatelen and others. By the end of 1920 the Commission devised the "Russian SFSR Electrification Plan" («План электрификации Р.С.Ф.С.Р»), that was approved subsequently by the 8th All-Russian Congress of Soviets on December 22, 1920, and accepted by the Sovnarkom (Soviet government) on December 21, 1921.

The Plan represented a major restructuring of the Soviet economy based on total electrification of the country. Lenin's stated goal for it was "...the organization of industry on the basis of modern, advanced technology, on electrification which will provide a link between town and country, will put an end to the division between town and country, will make it possible to raise the level of culture in the countryside and to overcome, even in the most remote corners of land, backwardness, ignorance, poverty, disease, and barbarism."

== Foreign authors about the plan ==
In 1920, British writer H. G. Wells visited Soviet Russia and met with Vladimir Lenin. Wells believed that it was impossible to realise the Russian revolutionary’s plan, as he wrote in his book Russia in the Shadows:

For Lenin, who like a good orthodox Marxist denounces all "Utopians," has succumbed at last to a Utopia, the Utopia of the electricians. He is throwing all his weight into a scheme for the development of great power stations in Russia to serve whole provinces with light, with transport, and industrial power. Two experimental districts he said had already been electrified. Can one imagine a more courageous project in a vast flat land of forests and illiterate peasants, with no water power, with no technical skill available, and with trade and industry at the last gasp? Projects for such an electrification are in process of development in Holland and they have been discussed in England, and in those densely-populated and industrially highly-developed centres one can imagine them as successful, economical, and altogether beneficial. But their application to Russia is an altogether greater strain upon the constructive imagination. I cannot see anything of the sort happening in this dark crystal of Russia, but this little man at the Kremlin can; he sees the decaying railways replaced by a new electric transport, sees new roadways spreading throughout the land, sees a new and happier Communist industrialism arising again. While I talked to him he almost persuaded me to share his vision.

— H. G. Wells

== Implementation ==
The GOELRO Plan was implemented during a 10- to 15-year period. According to the Plan, the territory of the Russian SFSR was divided into eight regions, with distinct development strategies due to the specific features of each region: Southern Region, Central Industrial region, Northern Region, Ural Region, Volga Region, Turkestan Region, Caucasus Region and Western Siberia Region. The Plan included the construction of a network of 30 regional power plants, including ten large hydroelectric power plants, and numerous electric-powered large industrial enterprises.

It was intended to increase the total national power output per year to 8.8 billion kWh, as compared to 1.9 billion kWh in Imperial Russia in 1913. Soviet propaganda declared the plan was basically fulfilled by 1931. While only three out of ten hydroelectric stations were built by 1930: the Volkhov, the Svir, and the Dnieper Hydroelectric Stations; the goal of 8.8 billion kWh was reached in 1931, and national power output continued to increase significantly. It reached 13.5 billion kWh by the end of the first five-year plan in 1932, 36 billion kWh by 1937, and 48 billion kWh by 1940.

Leon Trotsky as president of the electrification commission and the Opposition bloc also put forward an electrification plan which involved the construction of the hydroelectric Dnieprostroi dam.

Ivan Alexandrov later directed the Regionalisation Commission of Gosplan which divided the Soviet Union into thirteen European and eight Asiatic economic regions, using rational economic planning rather than "the vestiges of lost sovereign rights".

The term "Ilyich's lamp" (лампочка Ильича) for an electric bulb, a reference to Vladimir Ilyich Lenin, is a reminder of the Plan period.

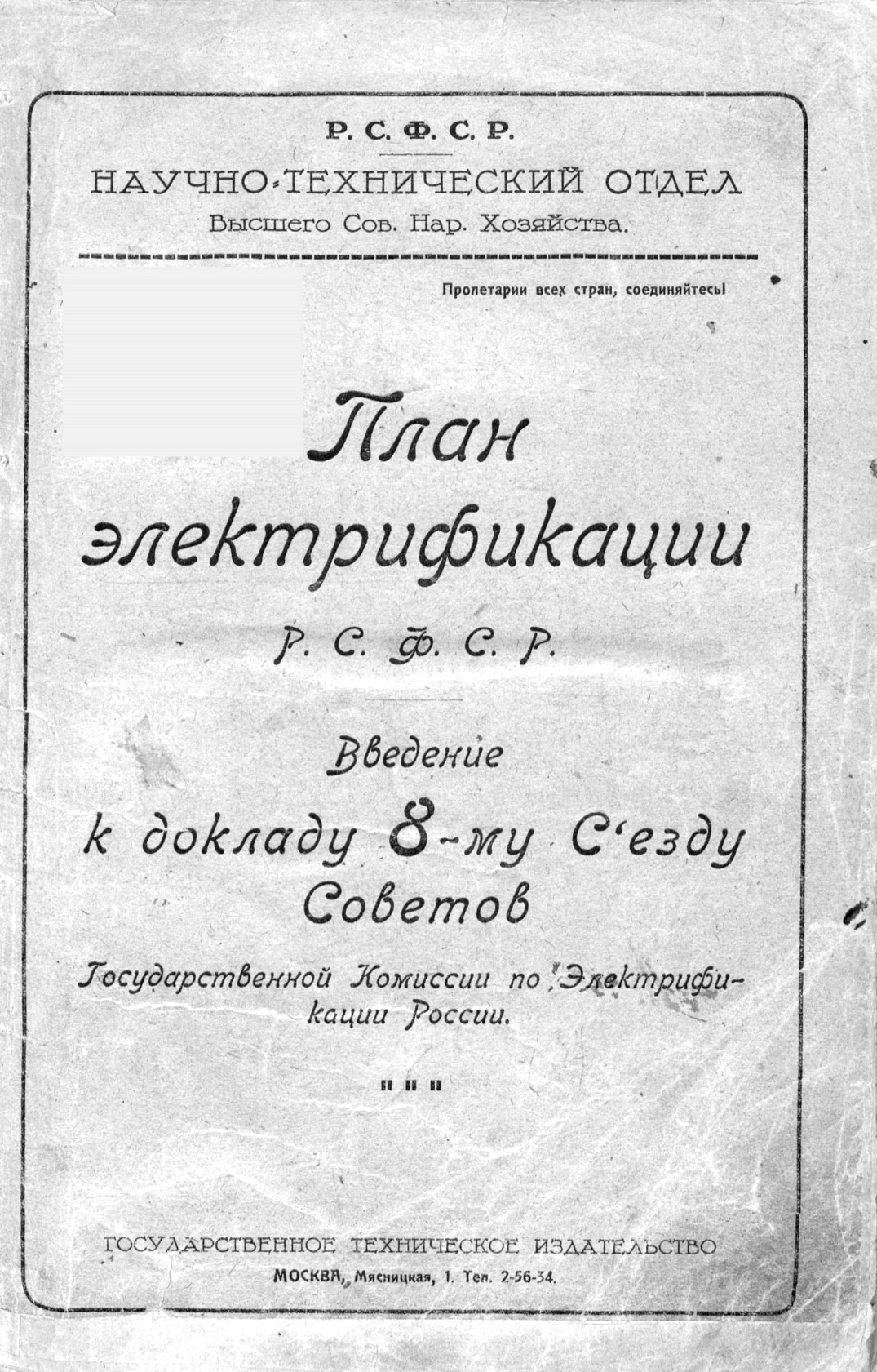
The GOELRO plan title page, 1920

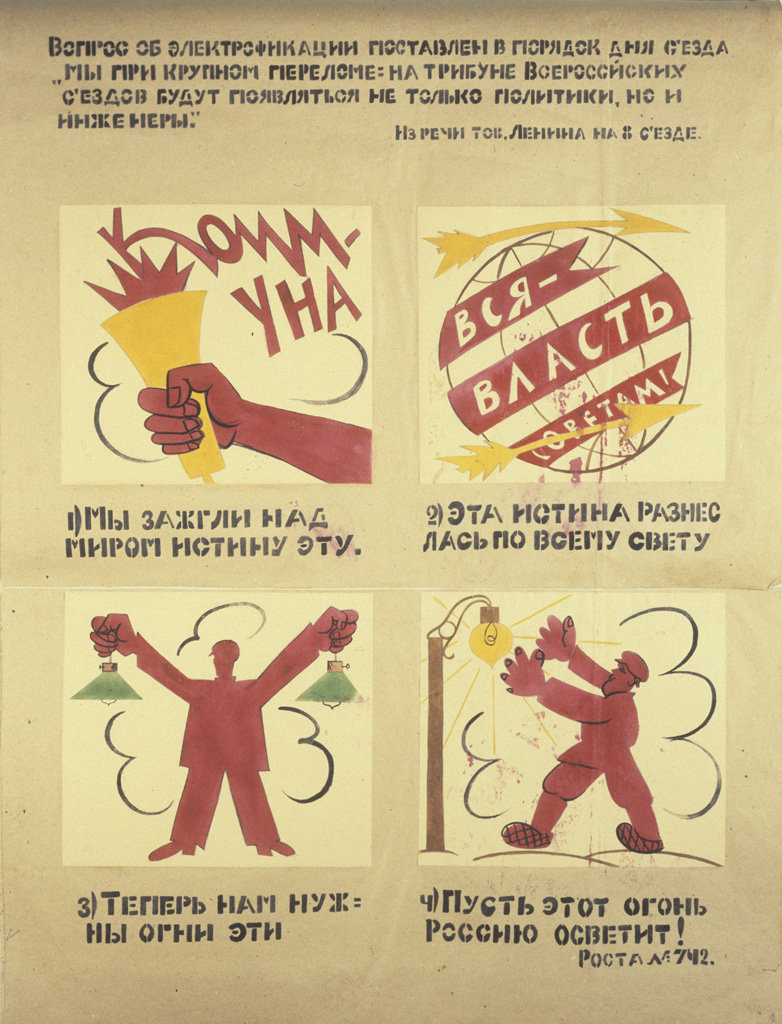
Poster #742 "Rosta Windows" dedicated to Russia's electrification by Vladimir Mayakovsky

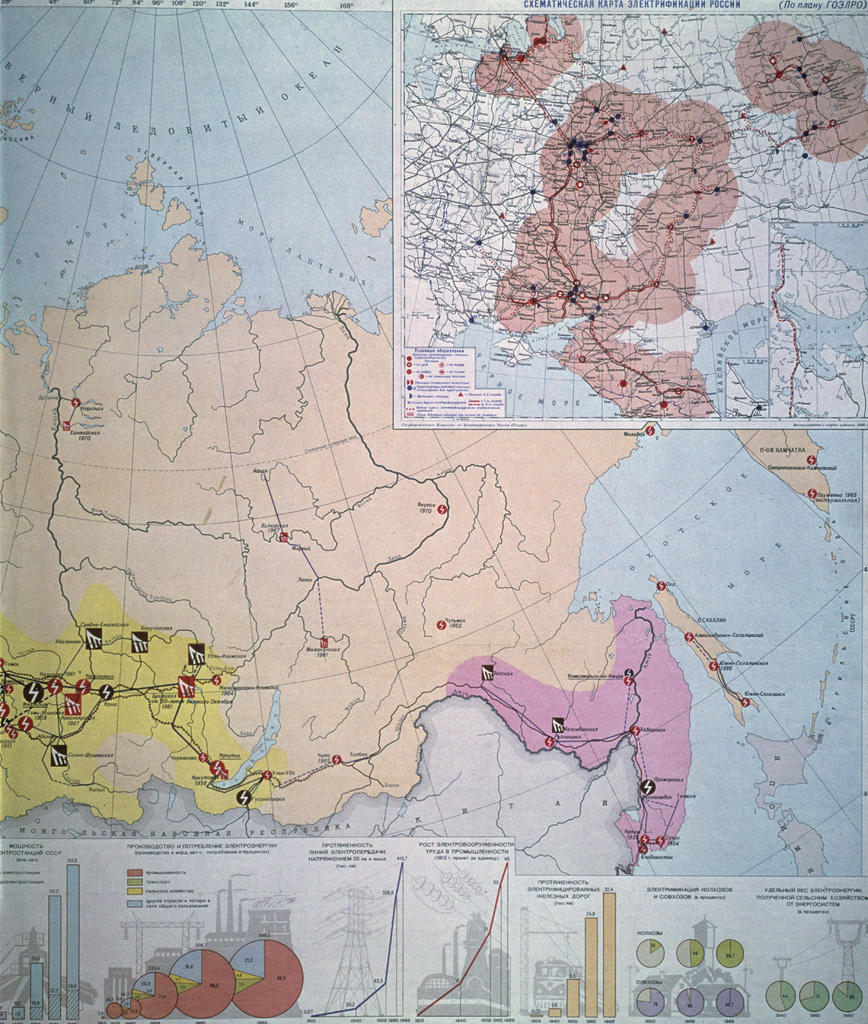
A map depicting Soviet Union’s electrification (1973)

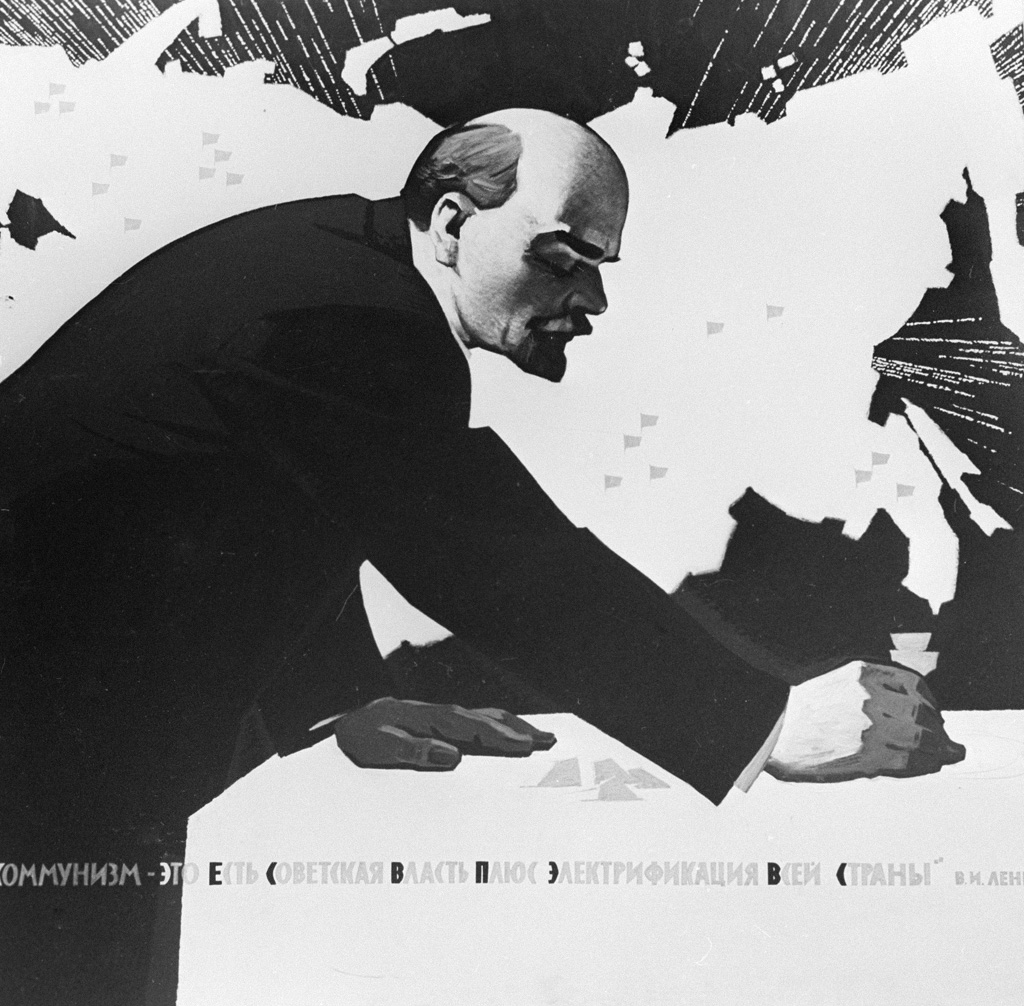
"GOELRO Plan" poster by Alexander Lemeshchenko (1967)

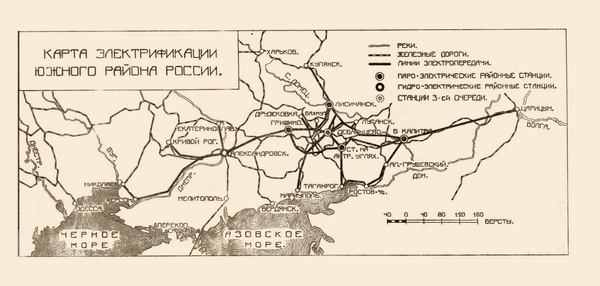
The electrification of the Southern District according to the GOELRO plan

== Legacy ==
In 1963, Che Guevara cited the GOELRO plan as a model for the development of revolutionary Cuba. Guevara's view was that electrification provided a crucial basis for advancing to a higher stage of development, although Guevara stated that in hindsight Lenin had overemphasized the importance of electrification in and of itself.
