= Russia in the Shadows =

1921 book by H. G. Wells

- Author: H. G. Wells
- Publisher: Hodder & Stoughton
- Publication date: 1921

Russia in the Shadows is a book by H. G. Wells published early in 1921, which includes a series of articles previously printed in the Sunday Express in connection with Wells's second visit to Russia (after a previous trip in January 1914 to Saint Petersburg and Moscow) in September and October 1920. Wells was at the height of his fame, having recently completed The Outline of History, and was paid £1000 for the articles by the Sunday Express. During his visit to Russia he visited his old friend Maxim Gorky, whom he had first met in 1906 on a trip to the United States, and who arranged Wells's meeting with Vladimir Lenin.

Wells portrayed Russia as recovering from a total social collapse, "the completest that has ever happened to any modern social organisation." He minimized the role of the Bolsheviks in the fall of the Russian state, and presented this explanation of their success: "While all the rest of Russia was either apathetic like the peasantry or garrulously at sixes and sevens or given over to violence or fear, the Communists were prepared to act."

In a chapter devoted to an interview with Lenin at the Kremlin, Wells describes the leader and founder of Russian communism. Wells portrays Lenin as a pragmatic leader who "has recently stripped off the last pretence that the Russian revolution is anything more than the inauguration of an age of limitless experiment."

While Wells in Russia in the Shadows, as always, rejects Marxism on principle (Das Kapital impresses him as "a monument of pretentious pedantry"), he argues that "we should understand and respect the professions and principles of the Bolsheviki" in order to make a "helpful intervention" in Russia, lest its social collapse drag down Western civilization with it.

== See also ==
- Russian Civil War
- Soviet Union
