= Ivan Alexandrov =

Russian and Soviet engineer (1875–1936)

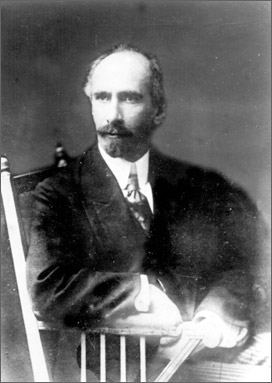
- Born: Ivan Gavrilovich Alexandrov; 1 September [O.S. 20 August] 1875; Moscow, Russian Empire
- Died: 2 May 1936 (aged 60); Moscow, Russian SFSR, Soviet Union

Ivan Gavrilovich Alexandrov (Russian: Ива́н Гаври́лович Алекса́ндров; 1 September [O.S. 21 August] 1875 – 2 May 1936) was a Russian and Soviet engineer who played a significant role in the modernization of the Soviet Union.

== Career ==
In 1920, Alexandrov participated in developing the GOELRO plan which was the electrification plan of the Soviet Union. From 1921 to 1927, he was Chief Engineer of the design organization Dniprobud or Dniprostroy (Ukrainian: Дніпробуд; Russian: «Днепрострой») and, in 1926, designed the Dnipr Dam on the Dnipr. From 1921, he headed the Regionalisation Committee of Gosplan and, as the director with support from Gleb Krzhizhanovsky, used rational economic planning rather than "the vestiges of lost sovereign rights" to divide the Soviet Union into thirteen European and eight Asiatic oblasts.

He participated in the plan of the general scheme for the electrification of Slovenia, and, in Asia, the plan for the construction of the Baikal-Amur Mainline (BAM).

From 1927 to 1930 he was the Head of the Department of Hydrology, Meteorology and Regulation of Flow at the Moscow State University of Environmental Engineering (MSUEE) (Russian: Московский государственный университет природообустройства).

He died in Moscow and was buried at the Novodevichy Cemetery.

== See also ==
- GOELRO plan
