= Russian war crimes =

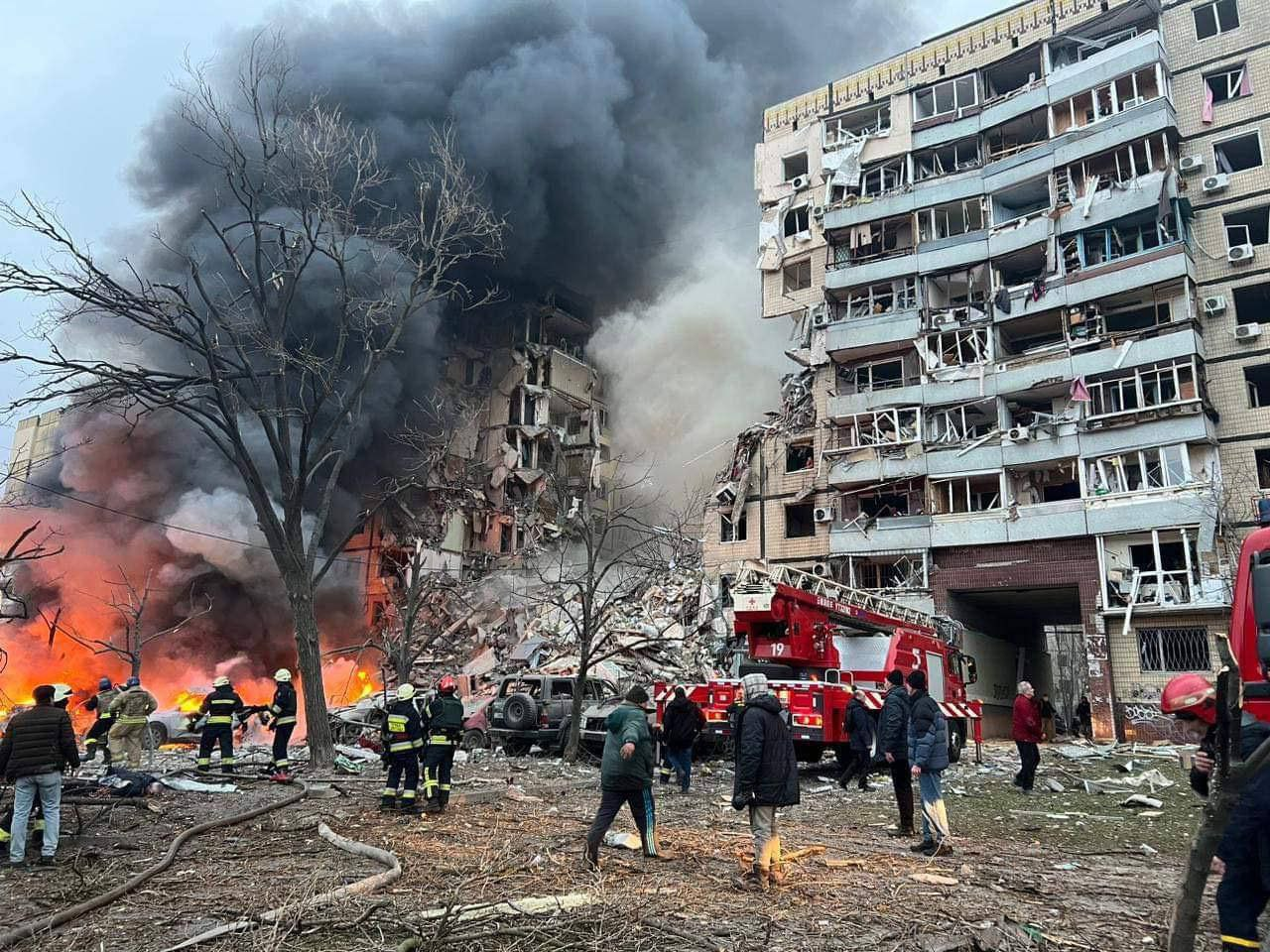
Residential building in Dnipro, Ukraine, after a Russian missile attack on 14 January 2023.

Russian war crimes are violations of international criminal law including war crimes, crimes against humanity and the crime of genocide which the official armed and paramilitary forces of Russia have committed or been accused of committing since the dissolution of the Soviet Union in 1991, as well as the aiding and abetting of crimes by proto-statelets or puppet statelets which are armed and financed by Russia, including the Luhansk People's Republic and the Donetsk People's Republic. These have included murder, torture, terror, persecution, deportation and forced transfer, enforced disappearance, child abductions, rape, looting, unlawful confinement, starvation, inhumane acts, unlawful airstrikes and attacks against civilian objects, use of banned chemical weapons, and wanton destruction.

Amnesty International and Human Rights Watch have documented Russian war crimes in Chechnya, Georgia, Ukraine and Syria. Médecins Sans Frontières also documented war crimes in Chechnya. In 2017 the Office of the United Nations High Commissioner for Human Rights (OHCHR) has reported that Russia used cluster and incendiary weapons in Syria, constituting the war crime of indiscriminate attacks in a civilian populated area. The Independent International Commission of Inquiry on Ukraine, set up by the OHCHR, found Russia committed war crimes in Ukraine in 2022 and 2023. On 13 April 2022, OSCE published a report finding that Russia committed war crimes in the Siege of Mariupol, while its targeted killings and enforced disappearance or abductions of civilians, including journalists and local officials, could tentatively also be crimes against humanity.

By 2009, the European Court of Human Rights (ECHR) issued 115 verdicts (including the verdict in the Baysayeva v. Russia case) in which it found the Russian government guilty of perpetrating enforced disappearances, murder, torture, and failing to properly investigate these crimes in Chechnya. In 2021, the ECHR also separately found Russia guilty of murder, torture, looting and destruction of homes in Georgia, as well as preventing the return of 20,000 displaced Georgians to their territory.

As a consequence of its involvement in the war in Ukraine, wide-scale international sanctions have been imposed on Russian officials by the governments of Western countries (twice in 2014 and twice in 2022). In 2016, Russia withdrew its signature from the International Criminal Court (ICC), when the Court began investigating Russia's invasion and annexation of Crimea for violations of international law. As a result, the United Nations General Assembly Resolution ES-11/3 officially suspended Russia from the UN Human Rights Council membership due to war crimes in Ukraine. Many Russian officials were found guilty by local courts for war crimes committed in both Chechnya and Ukraine. Ultimately, since 2023, the ICC indicted six Russian officials, including Russian leader Vladimir Putin, for war crimes in Ukraine.

== Russian war crimes before 1991 ==
=== Imperial Russian war crimes ===
After the Russo-Turkish War (1877–1878), the area around Kars was ceded to Russia. This resulted in a large number of Muslims leaving and settling in remaining Ottoman lands. Batum and its surrounding area was also ceded to Russia causing many local Turkish and Georgian Muslims to migrate to the west "as a result of persecution, or fear of persecution, by Christian Russians."

The historian Uğur Ümit Üngör noted that during the Russian invasion of Ottoman lands, "many atrocities were carried out against the local Turks and Kurds by the Russian army and Armenian volunteers." General Vladimir Liakhov gave the order to kill any Turk on sight and to destroy any mosque.

=== Soviet war crimes ===
From 1917 to 1991, a multitude of war crimes and crimes against humanity were carried out by the Soviet Union or its constituent Soviet republics, including the Russian Soviet Federative Socialist Republic and its armed forces. They include acts which were committed by the Red Army (later called the Soviet Army) as well as acts which were committed by the country's secret police, NKVD, including its Internal Troops. In many cases, these acts were committed upon the direct orders of Soviet leaders Vladimir Lenin and Joseph Stalin in pursuance of the early Soviet policy of Red Terror as a means to justify executions and political repression. In other instances they were committed without orders by Soviet troops against prisoners of war or civilians of countries that had been in armed conflict with the Soviet Union, or they were committed during partisan warfare.

A significant number of these incidents occurred in Northern, Central, and Eastern Europe before, during, and in the aftermath of World War II, involving summary executions and the mass murder of prisoners of war (POWs), such as in the Katyn massacre and mass rape by troops of the Red Army in territories they occupied.

In the 1990s and 2000s, war crimes trials held in the Baltic states led to the prosecution of some Russians, mostly in absentia, for crimes against humanity committed during or shortly after World War II, including killings or deportations of civilians. Today, the Russian government engages in historical negationism. Russian media refers to the Soviet crimes against humanity and war crimes as a "Western myth". In Russian history textbooks, the atrocities are either altered to portray the Soviets positively or omitted entirely. In 2017, Russian president Vladimir Putin while acknowledging the "horrors of Stalinism", criticized the "excessive demonization of Stalin" by "Russia's enemies".

== Chechnya ==
Following the dissolution of the Soviet Union in 1991, Chechnya declared its independence. Russian officials refused to recognize Chechnya's declaration of independence, sparking tensions. These tensions ultimately escalated into a full-scale war when 25,000 Russian soldiers crossed into Chechnya on 11 December 1994. The war ended with de facto Chechen independence and a Russian troop withdrawal in 1996. However, tensions between Russia and Chechnya still existed and they continued to escalate until the second war broke out in 1999, and Russia waged counterinsurgency until 2009. It was concluded when Russia took full control of Chechnya and installed a pro-Russian government. Numerous war crimes were committed, most of them were committed by the Russian armed forces. Some scholars has estimated that the brutality of the Russian attacks on such a small ethnic group amounts to a crime of genocide.

During the two wars, the Chechens were dehumanized and Russian propaganda depicted them as "blacks", "bandits", "terrorists", "cockroaches" and "bedbugs". The Russian armed forces perpetrated numerous war crimes.

=== First Chechen War ===
Throughout the First Chechen War, human rights organizations accused Russian forces of starting a brutal war with total disregard for international humanitarian law, causing tens of thousands of unnecessary civilian casualties among the Chechen population. The main strategy in the Russian war effort was to use heavy artillery and air strikes, leading to numerous indiscriminate attacks on civilians. According to Human Rights Watch, the campaign was "unparalleled in the area since World War II for its scope and destructiveness, followed by months of indiscriminate and targeted fire against civilians".

The crimes included the use of prohibited cluster bombs in the 1995 Shali cluster bomb attack, which targeted a market, a gas station and a hospital, and the April 1995 Samashki massacre, in which it is estimated that up to 300 civilians died during the attack. Russian forces conducted an operation of zachistka, house-by-house searches throughout the entire village. Federal soldiers deliberately and arbitrarily attacked civilians and civilian dwellings in Samashki by shooting residents and burning houses with flame-throwers. They wantonly opened fire or threw grenades into basements where residents, mostly women, elderly persons and children, had been hiding. Russian troops intentionally burned many bodies, either by throwing the bodies into burning houses or by setting them on fire.

During the First Battle of Grozny, Russian air raids and artillery bombardments were described as the heaviest bombing campaign in Europe since the destruction of Dresden. The Russian historian and general Dmitri Volkogonov said the Russian military's bombardment of Grozny killed around 35,000 civilians, including 5,000 children. This has led to Western and Chechen sources describing the Russian strategy as deliberate terror bombing. The bloodbath of Grozny shocked Russia and the outside world, causing severe criticism of the war. International monitors from the Organization for Security and Co-operation in Europe (OSCE) described the scenes as nothing short of an "unimaginable catastrophe", while former Soviet leader Mikhail Gorbachev called the war a "disgraceful, bloody adventure" and German chancellor Helmut Kohl called it "sheer madness".

In a March 1996 report, the United Nations Commission on Human Rights (UNCHR) accused Russian troops of firing on civilians and killing them at checkpoints and of summarily executing captured Chechen men, both civilians and fighters. Two cases involved Russian soldiers murdering humanitarian aid workers who tried to save a civilian from execution on a street in Grozny. Russian Ministry of Interior forces officers fired into a group of soldiers who refused to kill the civilian population.

=== Second Chechen War ===
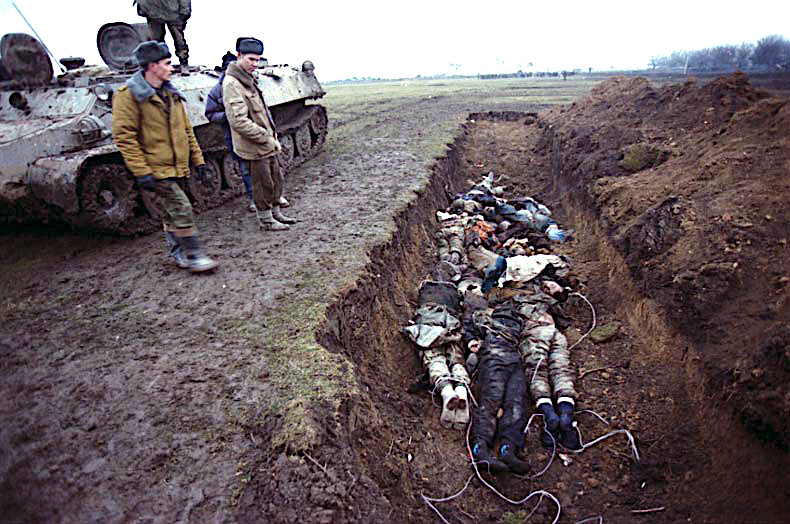
Russian troops burying corpses in a mass grave in Chechnya during the Second Chechen War

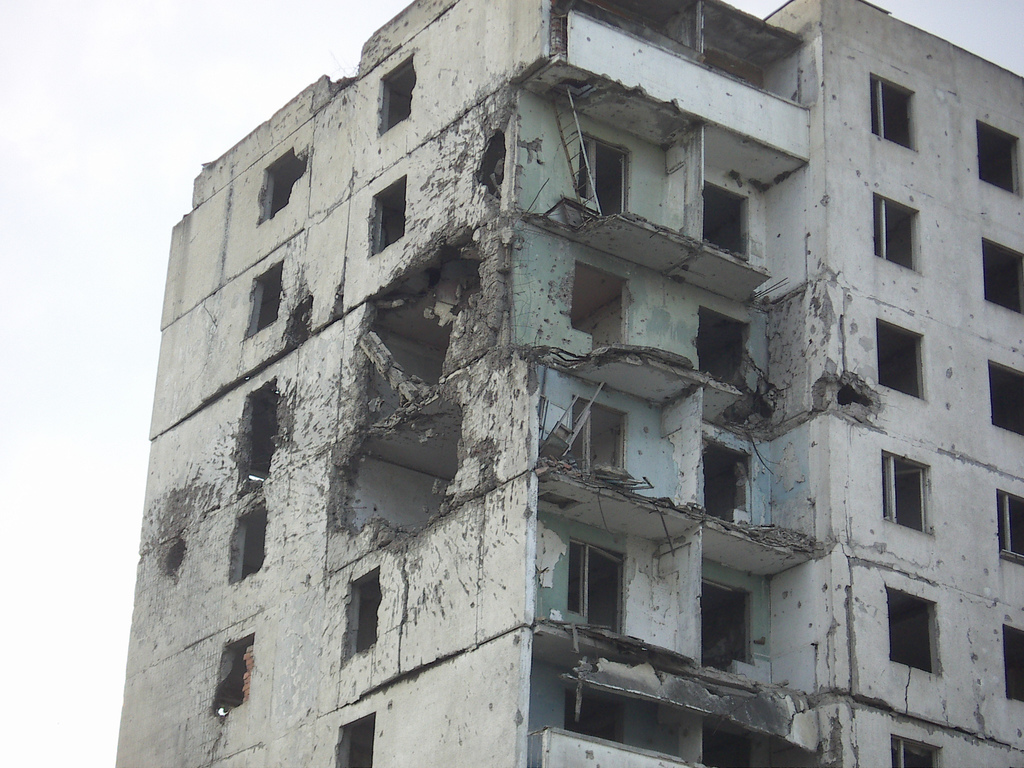
A building damaged during the war in Grozny

The Second Chechen War, which began in 1999, was even more brutal than the previous war. According to human rights activists, Russian troops systematically committed the following crimes in Chechnya: the destruction of cities and villages, not justified by military necessity; shelling and bombardment of unprotected settlements; summary extrajudicial executions and killings of civilians; torture, ill-treatment and infringement of human dignity; serious bodily harm intentionally inflicted on persons not directly participating in hostilities; deliberate strikes against the civilian population, civilian and medical vehicles; illegal detentions of the civilian population; enforced disappearances; looting and destruction of civilian and public property; extortion; taking hostages for ransom; corpse trade. There were also rapes, which, along with women, were also subjected to men.

Some of the crimes committed towards the civilian population included the following: 1999 Elistanzhi cluster bomb attack against civilians, leaving mostly women and children dead. The Grozny ballistic missile attack, in which ten hypersonic missiles fell without warning and targeted the city's only maternity hospital, post office, mosque, and a crowded market. The casualties occurred at the central market, and the attack is estimated to have killed over 100 instantly and injured up to 400 others. The Russian Air Force perpetrated repeated rocket attacks on a large convoy of refugees trying to enter Ingushetia through a supposed "safe exit" during the Baku–Rostov highway bombing. This was repeated in December 1999 when Russian soldiers opened fire on a refugee convoy marked with white flags.

During the Alkhan-Yurt massacre where Russian soldiers went on a murdering spree throughout the village and summarily executing, raping, torturing, looting, burning and killing anyone in their way. Nearly all the killings were committed by Russian soldiers who were looting. Civilian attempts to stop the madness were often met with death. There has been no serious attempt conducted by the Russian authorities to bring to justice those responsible for the crimes committed at Alkhan-Yurt. Credible testimony suggests that Russian leadership in the region had knowledge of what was happening and simply chose to ignore it. Russian military leadership dismissed the incident as "fairy tales", claiming that the bodies were planted and the slaughter fabricated in order to damage the reputation of Russian troops. Russian general Vladimir Shamanov dismissed accountability for the abuses in the village saying "Don't you dare touch the soldiers and officers of the Russian army. They are doing a sacred thing today – they are defending Russia. And don't you dare sully the Russian soldier with your dirty hands!"

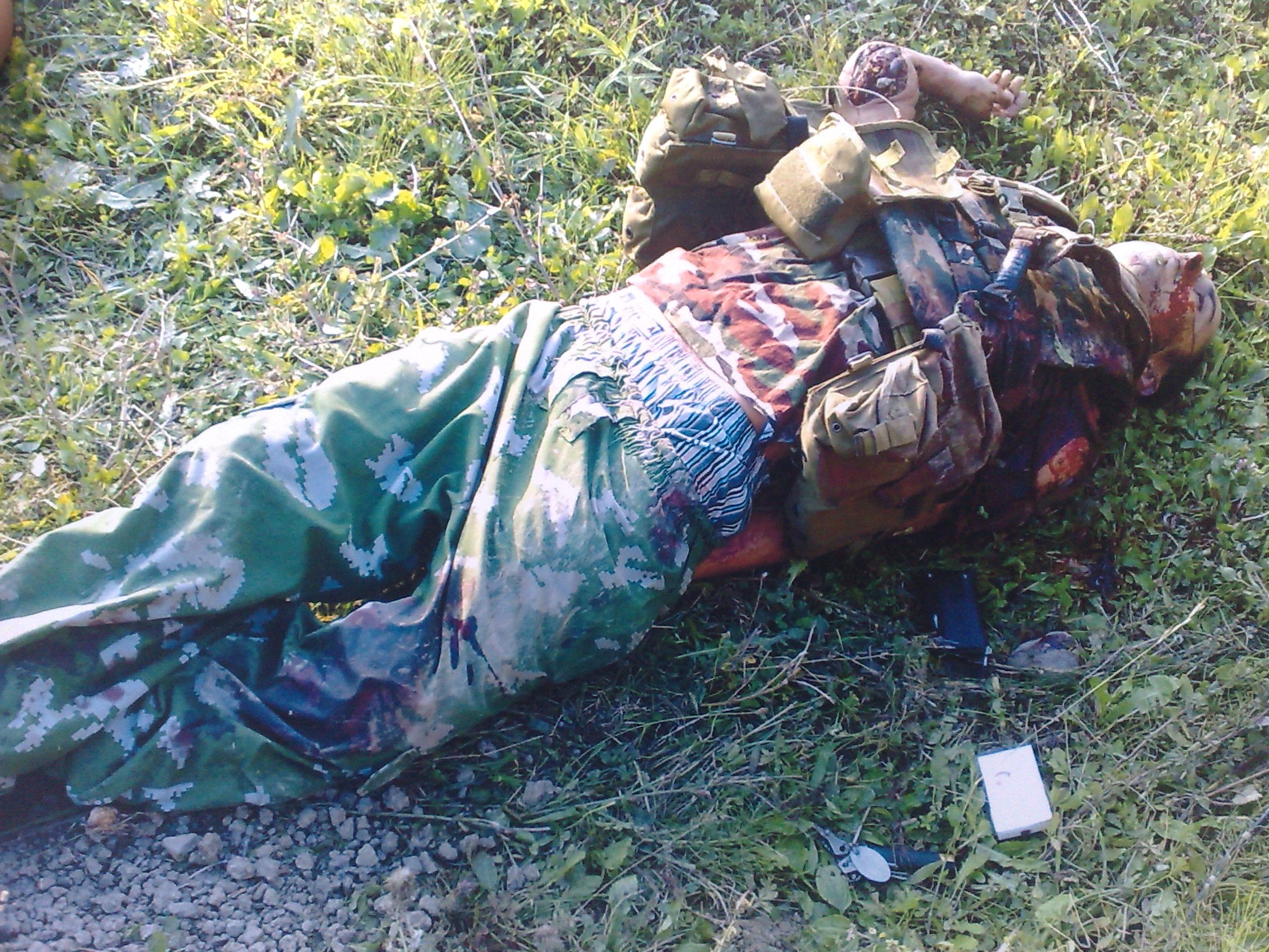
Dead Chechen soldier

In what is regarded as one of the gravest war crimes in the war, Russian federal forces went on a village-sweep (zachistka), that involved summary executions of dozens of people, murder, looting, arson and rape of Chechen civilians in what is known as the Novye Aldi massacre. Russian troops had cluster-bombed the village a day prior before entering the village, telling local residents to come out from their cellars for inspection the next day. Upon entering the village, Russian soldiers shot their victims in cold blood, with automatic fire at close range. Victims ranged from one-year-old babies to an 82 year old woman. Victims were asked for money or jewelry by Russian soldiers, which served as a pretext for their execution if the amount was insufficient. Federal soldiers removed gold teeth from their victims and looted their corpses. Killings were accompanied by arson in an attempt to destroy evidence of summary executions and other civilian killings. There were several cases of rape. In one incident, Russian soldiers gang raped several women before strangling them to death. Pillage on a massive scale took place in the village, with Russian soldiers stripping the houses of civilians in broad daylight. Any attempt to make the Russian authorities take responsibilities for the massacre resulted in indignant denial. Human Rights Watch described the Russian authorities' response as "typical". A spokesperson from the Russian Ministry of Defence declared that "these assertions are nothing but a concoction not supported by fact or any proof ... [and] should be seen as a provocation whose goal is to discredit the federal forces' operation against the terrorists in Chechnya". An eye-witness also said that investigators from the Federal Security Service told her the massacre was probably committed by Chechen fighters "disguised as federal troops".

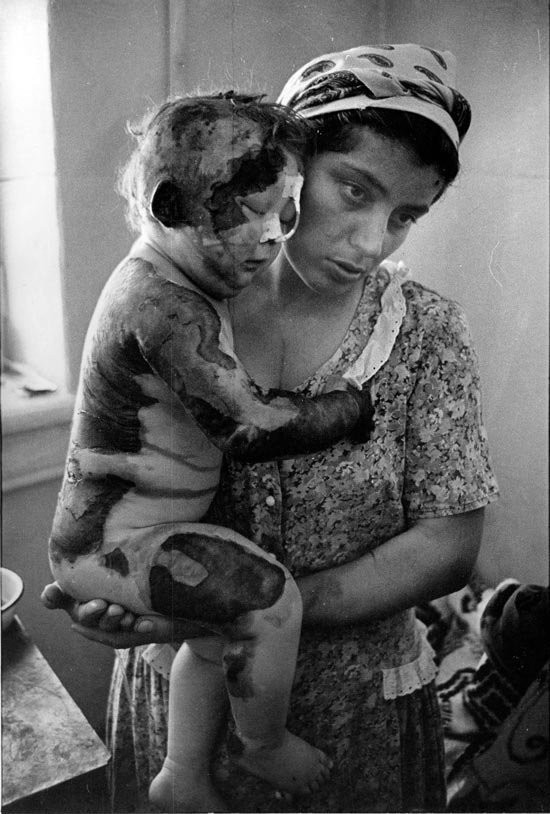
A Chechen woman with a wounded child

During the Staropromyslovsky massacre between December 1999 and January 2000, Russian soldiers went on an apparent spree, rounding up civilians and summarily executing them. The crimes included widespread looting and arson. Victims included the entire nine-member family of the Zubayevs, which had reportedly been shot dead in the street by a heavy machine gun (most likely from an armored vehicle). In one incident, Russian soldiers fired at civilians hiding in a cellar. According to a survivor of the incident, upon having yelled out to the soldiers, "Please don't shoot us, we are local civilians", the soldiers ordered them to come out of the cellar with their hands up. After coming out of the cellar, the Russian soldiers ordered them back down, after which they threw down several hand grenades at the civilians. The survivors were then again ordered back out of the cellar, after which the Russian soldiers shot the survivors with machine gun fire at close range. The massacre went unpunished and unacknowledged by the Russian authorities.

The 1999–2000 siege and bombardments of Grozny caused tens of thousands of civilians to perish. The Russian army issued an ultimatum during the siege urging Chechens to leave the city or be destroyed without mercy. Around 300 people were killed while trying to escape in October 1999 and subsequently buried in a mass grave. The Russian president Putin vowed that the military would not stop bombing Grozny until Russian troops "fulfilled their task to the end". In 2003, the United Nations called Grozny the most destroyed city on Earth. The bombing of Grozny included banned Buratino thermobaric and fuel-air bombs, igniting the air of civilians hiding in basements. There were also reports of the use of chemical weapons, banned by the Geneva Protocol and the Chemical Weapons Convention.

International humanitarian workers are reported to have been killed by Russian soldiers during the war in Chechnya. On 17 December 1996, six delegates of the International Committee of the Red Cross (ICRC) were killed in an attack by masked gunmen at the ICRC hospital in Novye Atagi, near Grozny. In 2010, Russian special forces officer Major Aleksi Potyomkin claimed that the murders were perpetrated by FSB agents. A 2004 report identified Russian soldiers using rape as means of torture against the Chechens. Out of 428 villages in Chechnya, 380 were bombed in the conflicts, leaving a 70% destruction of households behind.

==== Total casualties ====
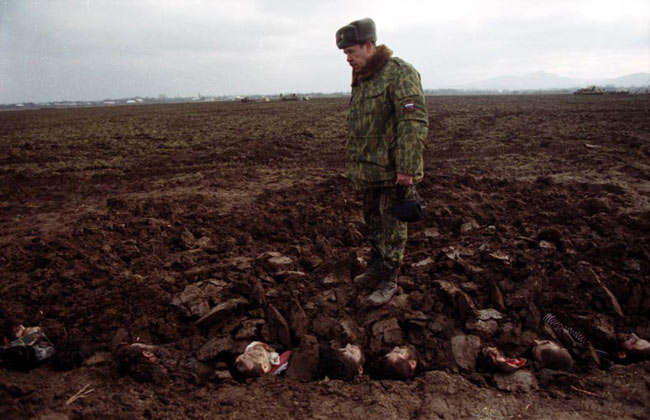
A Russian soldier stands on a mass grave of Chechens in Komsomolskoye, who were killed in the Second Chechen War, 2000

Amnesty International estimated that between 20,000 and 30,000 civilians have been killed in the First Chechen War alone, mostly by indiscriminate attacks by Russian forces on densely populated areas, and that a further 25,000 civilians died in the Second Chechen War. Another source assumes that 40,000–45,000 civilians were killed in the second conflict. Meanwhile, in 1996, the then Russian National Security chief Aleksandr Lebed said that 80,000 people died in the first war. Combined with the military forces, historians estimate that up to a tenth of the entire Chechen population died in the first war, 100,000 people out of a million. Conservative estimates assume that at least 100,000–150,000 people died in the two conflicts. Higher estimates by Chechen officials and nationals assume that up to 200,000–300,000 died in the two wars.

Since the start of the conflicts, there have been 57 recorded mass graves in Chechnya.

Human Rights Watch additionally recorded between 3,000 and 5,000 forced disappearances in Chechnya between 1999 and 2005, and classified it as a crime against humanity.

The German-based NGO Society for Threatened Peoples accused the Russian authorities of genocide in its 2005 report on Chechnya.

== Georgia ==
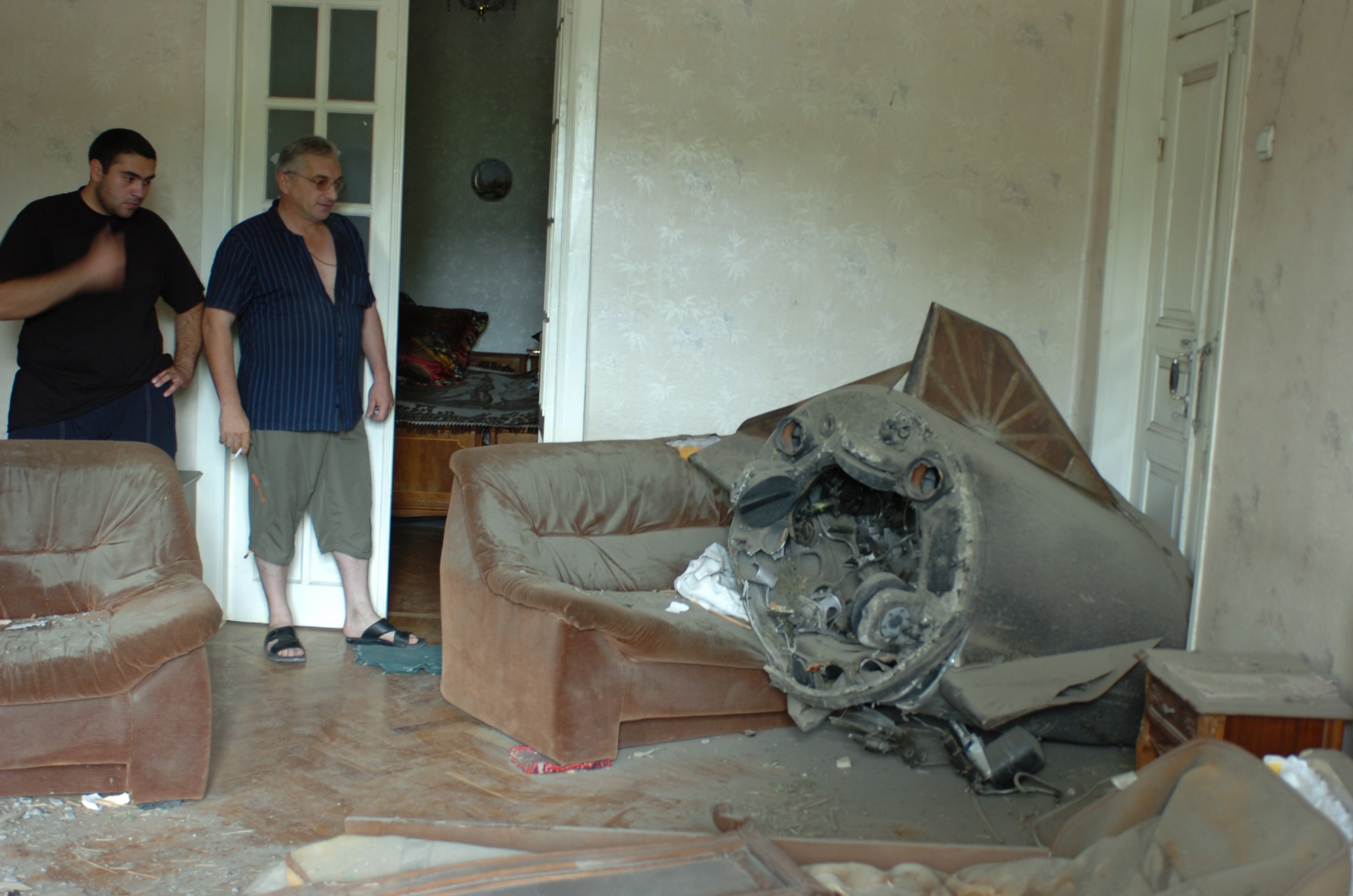
Nearly-intact Russian missile booster in the bedroom of a Gori house, an example of a possible indiscriminate attack in civilian areas

Following a 7 August 2008 escalation between the break-away region of South Ossetia and Georgia, the Russian forces crossed the international border on 8 August and attacked Georgian soldiers in support of South Ossetia. Russian soldiers also crossed into the other break-away region of Abkhazia, even though no fighting was recorded there. The war ended on 12 August with a ceasefire brokered by international diplomats. The Russian government recognized South Ossetia and Abkhazia as independent countries, though some scholars described that the two regions actually became Russian protectorates.

HRW reported that no proof of intentional attacks on non-combatants by Georgian troops had been discovered.

Russia deliberately attacked fleeing civilians in South Ossetia and the Gori district of Georgia. Russian warplanes bombed civilian population centres in Georgia proper and villages of ethnic Georgians in South Ossetia. Armed militias engaged in plundering, burning and kidnappings. Attacks by militias compelled Georgian civilians to run away.

The use of cluster bombs by the Russians caused fatalities among civilians. Amnesty International accused Russia of deliberately bombarding and attacking civilian areas and infrastructure, which is a war crime. Russia denied using cluster bombs. 228 Georgian civilians perished in the conflict.

Additionally, the Russian military did nothing to prevent the ethnic cleansing of Georgians in South Ossetia in the area under its control.

== Ukraine ==
=== 2014–2021 ===
Following the 2014 Ukrainian revolution, the pro-Russian Ukrainian President, Viktor Yanukovych, was ousted and fled to Russia, and the new Ukrainian government adopted a pro-European perspective. Russia proceeded to invade and annex Crimea, which was declared illegal by the UN General Assembly in its resolution 68/262, while pro-Russian separatists declared the unrecognized quasi-state Novorossiya, intending a secession from Ukraine, and an insurgency which eventually led to the war in Donbas, the eastern parts of Ukraine. While Russia denied its involvement in the war in Donbas, numerous pieces of evidence pointed to its support of the pro-Russian separatists. Amnesty International accused Russia of "fuelling separatist crimes" and it called upon "all parties, including Russia, to stop their violations of the laws of war".

The Russians widely use torture against captured Ukrainians (both military and civilians, which is a war crime). One of the first recorded cases of torture of prisoners of war in Ukraine was an incident on 7 October 2014 in the city of Zuhres (Donetsk region), when 53-year-old Ukrainian Ihor Kozhoma, who was trying to take his wife out of the occupied territory, was tied to a column and tortured for several hours by Russians and local separatists. A similar case was with Donetsk civilian resident Iryna Dovhan who was publicly tortured for her pro-Ukrainian position in August 2014.

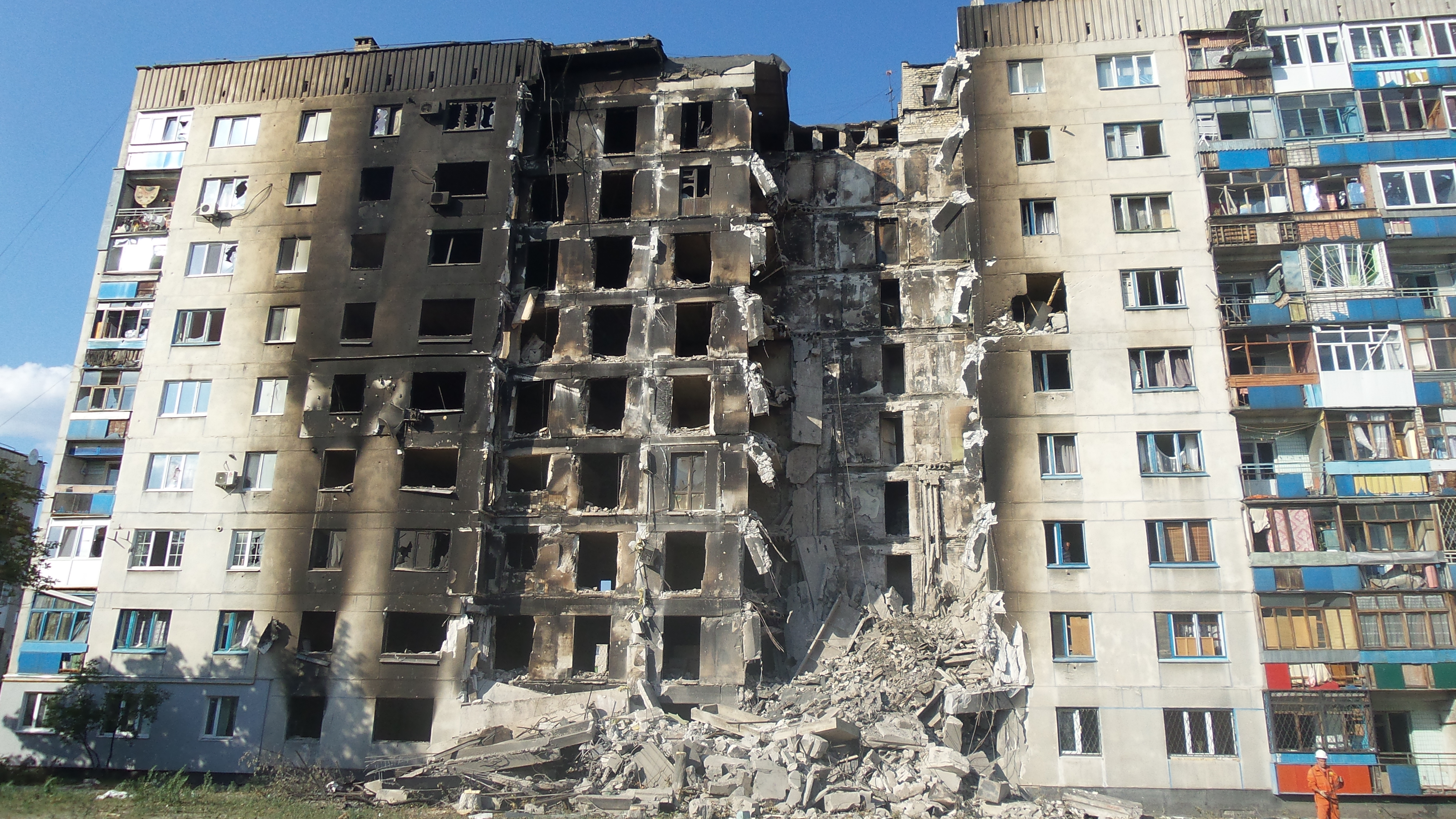
Damaged building in Lysychansk, 2014

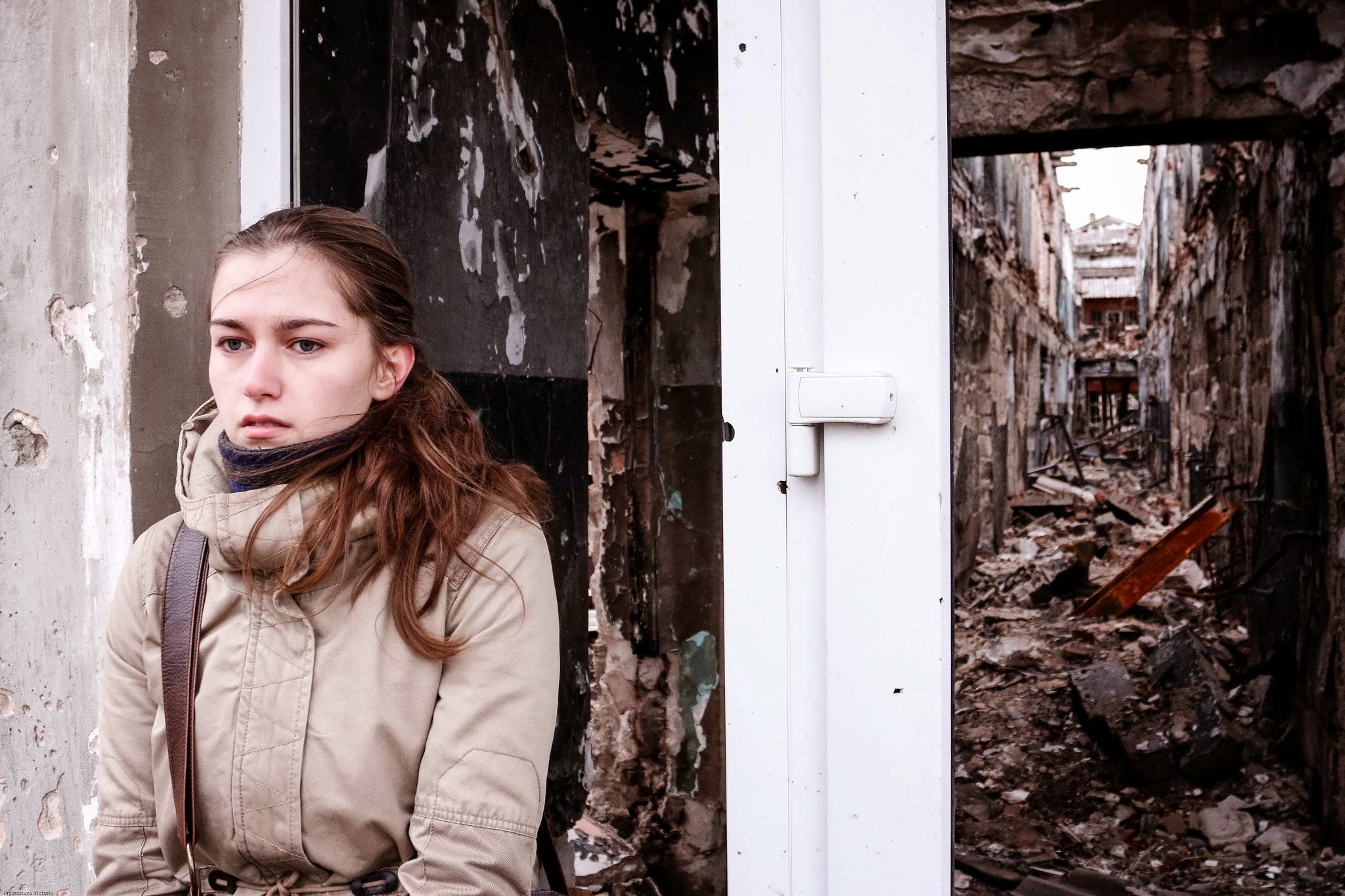
Damaged building in Kurakhove, 26 November 2014

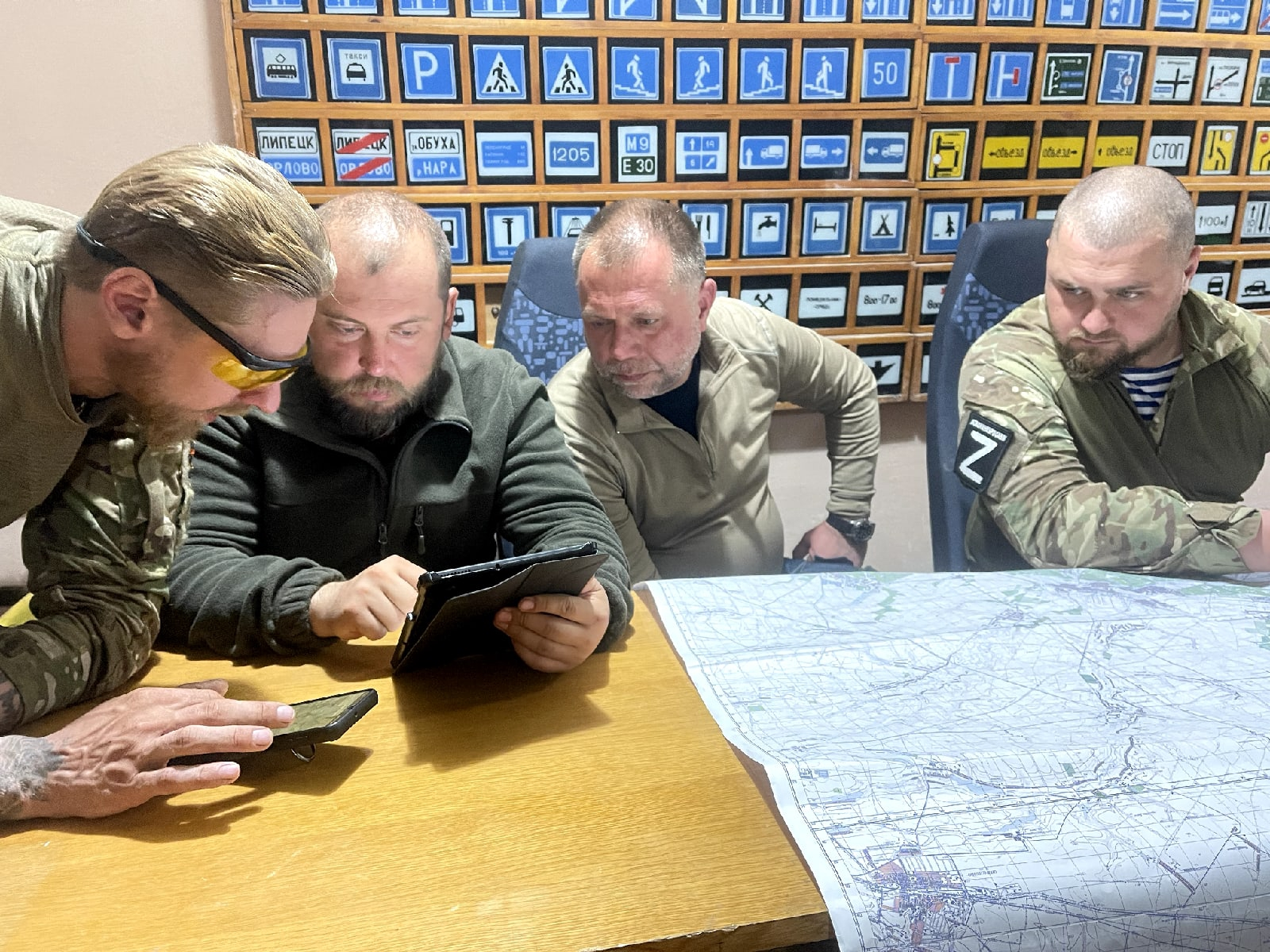
Russian neo-Nazi Yan Petrovsky and one of the "Donetsk People's Republic" leaders Alexander Borodai, guilty of a number of crimes against Ukraine

Human Rights Watch stated that pro-Russian insurgents "failed to take all feasible precautions to avoid deploying in civilian areas" and in one case "actually moved closer to populated areas as a response to government shelling". HRW called on all sides to stop using the "notoriously imprecise" Grad rockets.

Another report by Human Rights Watch said that the insurgents had been "running amok ... taking, beating and torturing hostages, as well as wantonly threatening and beating people who are pro-Kiev". It also said that the insurgents had destroyed medical equipment, threatened medical staff, and occupied hospitals. A member of Human Rights Watch witnessed the exhumation of a "mass grave" in Sloviansk that was uncovered after insurgents retreated from the city.

Insurgents with bayonet-equipped automatic rifles in the city of Donetsk paraded captured Ukrainian soldiers through the streets on 24 August, the Independence Day of Ukraine. During the parade, Russian nationalistic songs were played from loudspeakers, and members of the crowd jeered at the prisoners with epithets like "fascist". Street cleaning machines followed the protesters, "cleansing" the ground they were paraded on. Human Rights Watch said that this was in clear violation of the common article 3 of the Geneva Conventions. The article forbids "outrages upon personal dignity, in particular humiliating and degrading treatment". They further said that the parade "may be considered a war crime".

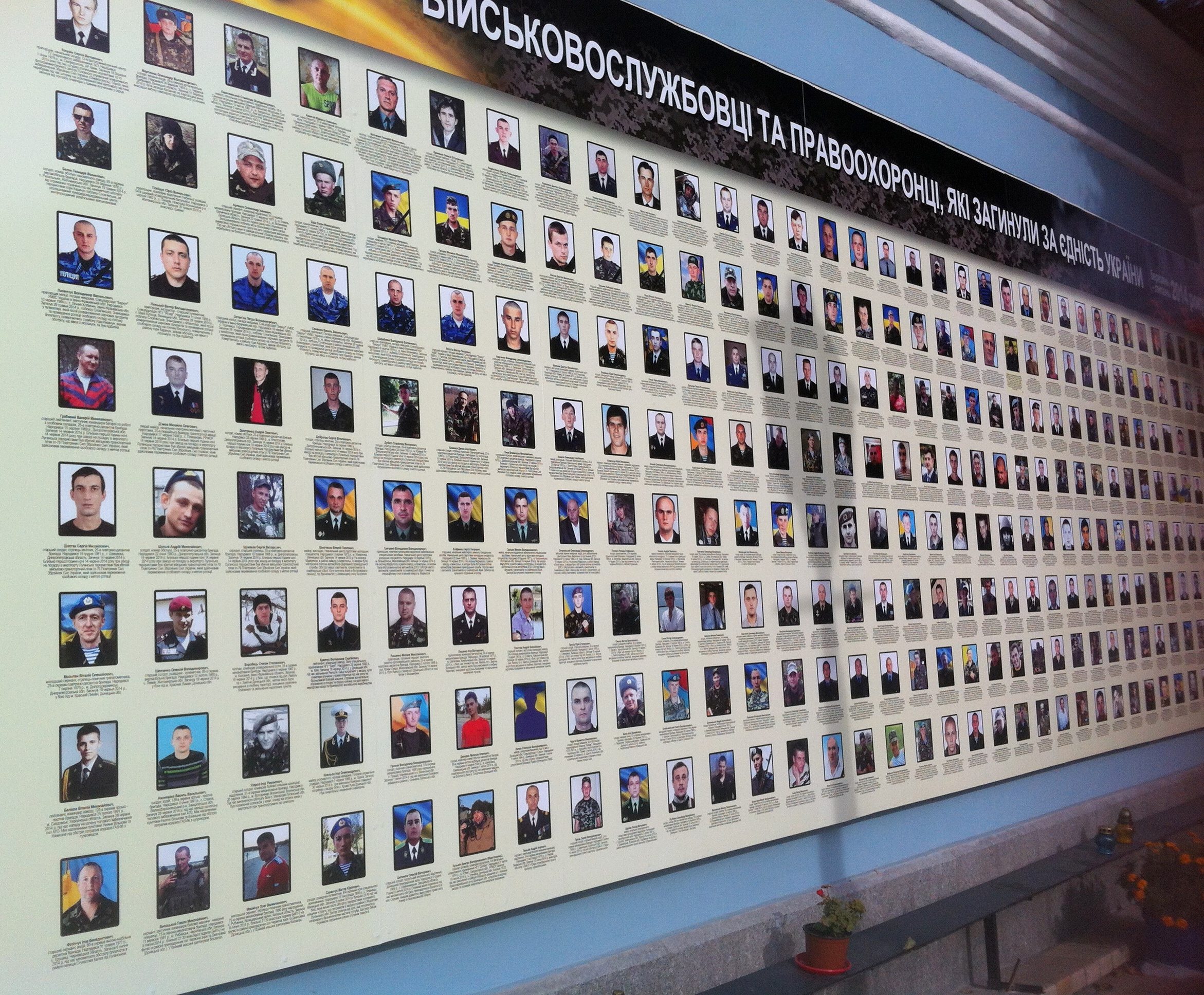
A mural of Ukrainian soldiers and police officers who died "defending Ukrainian unity" in Kyiv

A map of human rights violations committed by the separatists, called the "Map of Death", was published by the Security Service of Ukraine (SBU) in October 2014. The reported violations included detention camps and mass graves. Subsequently, on 15 October, the SBU opened a case on "crimes against humanity" perpetrated by insurgent forces.

A mid-October report by Amnesty International documented cases of summary executions by pro-Russian forces. A report by Human Rights Watch documented use of cluster munitions by anti-government forces.

In October 2014, Aleksey Mozgovoy organised a "people's court" in Alchevsk that issued a death sentence by a show of hands to a man accused of rape.

At a press conference in Kyiv on 15 December 2015, UN Assistant Secretary-General for human rights Ivan Šimonović stated that the majority of human rights violations committed during the conflict were carried out by the separatists.

Amnesty International reported that it had found "new evidence" of summary killings of Ukrainian soldiers on 9 April 2015. Having reviewed video footage, it determined that at least four Ukrainian soldiers had been shot dead "execution style". AI deputy director for Europe and Central Asia Denis Krivosheev said that "the new evidence of these summary killings confirms what we have suspected for a long time". Amnesty also said that a recording released by the Kyiv Post of a man, allegedly separatist leader Arseny Pavlov, claiming to have killed fifteen Ukrainian prisoners of war was a "chilling confession", and that it highlighted "the urgent need for an independent investigation into this and all other allegations of abuses". In 2017, HRW declared that Russia is persecuting Crimean Tatars in occupied Crimea, and subjecting them to enforced disappearances. Russia's actions in Ukraine have been described as crimes against peace and crimes against humanity (Malaysia Airlines Flight 17 shoot down).

In 2019, the Ukrainian government considered 7% of Ukraine's territory to be under occupation. The United Nations General Assembly resolution A/73/L.47, adopted on 17 December 2018, mostly concurred and designated Crimea as under "temporary occupation". Nevertheless, Ukraine failed to take any military action against the invasion of Crimea and opted for an approach of appeasement, ignoring Ukrainian citizens living there suffering under the Russian occupation.

The United Nations recorded that the war claimed the lives of over 3,000 civilians by 2018.

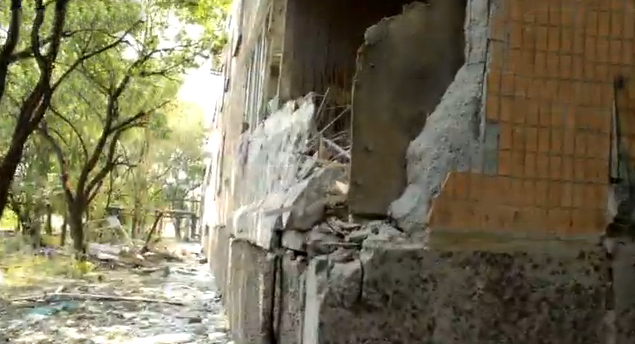
A damaged block of flats in Donetsk, 14 July 2014

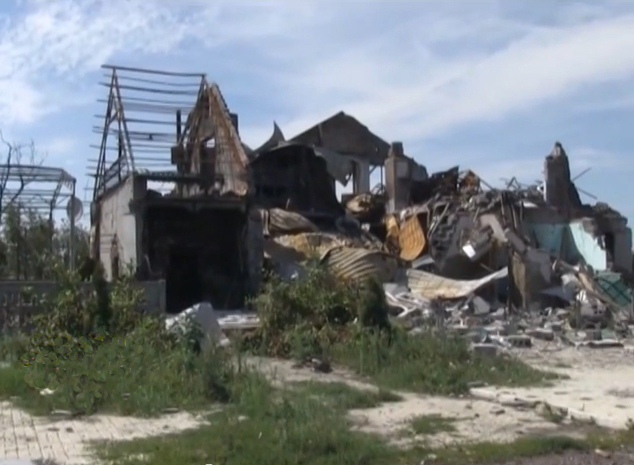
A destroyed house in the Donbas, July 2014

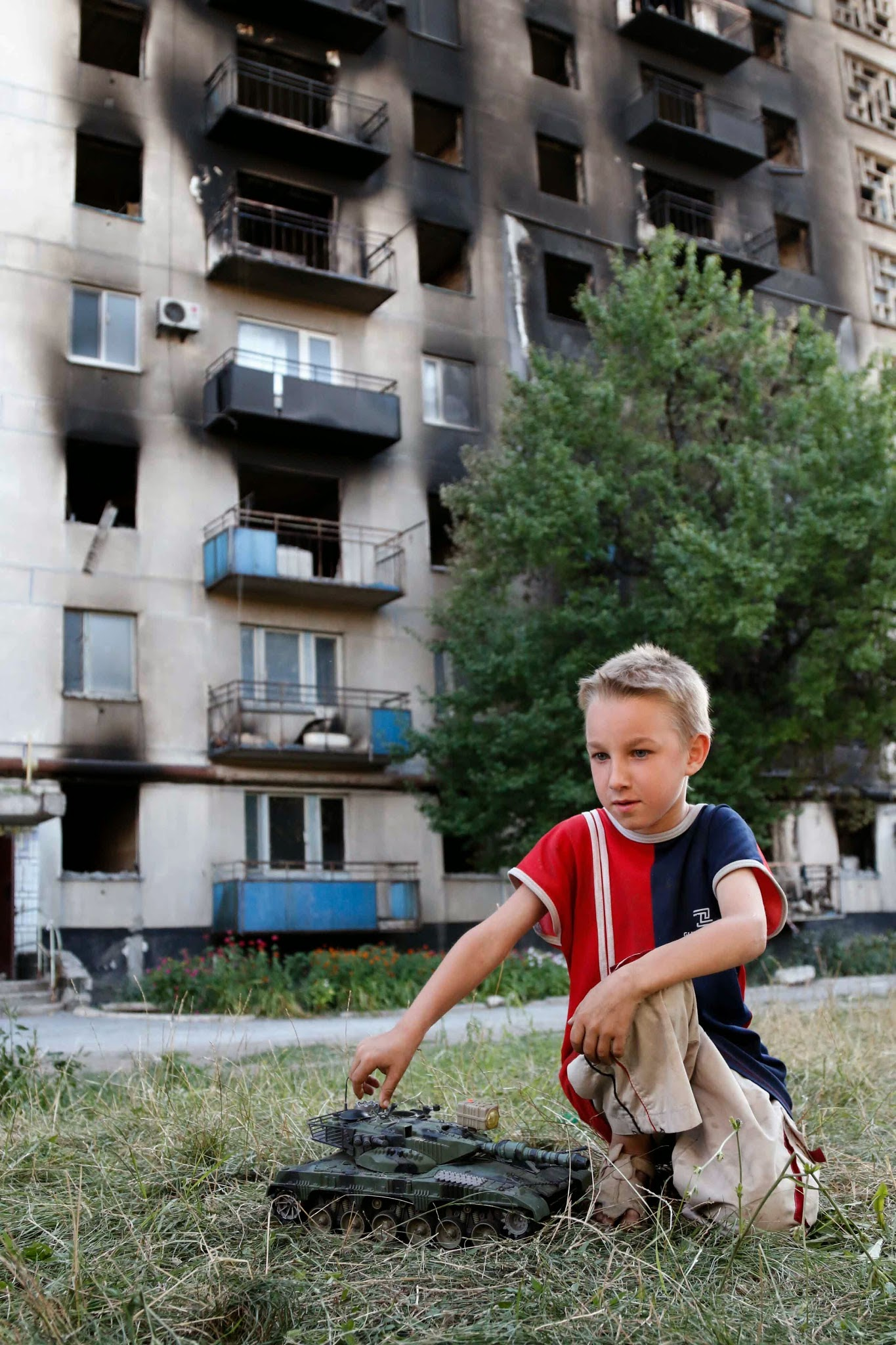
A damaged tower block in Lysychansk, 28 July 2014

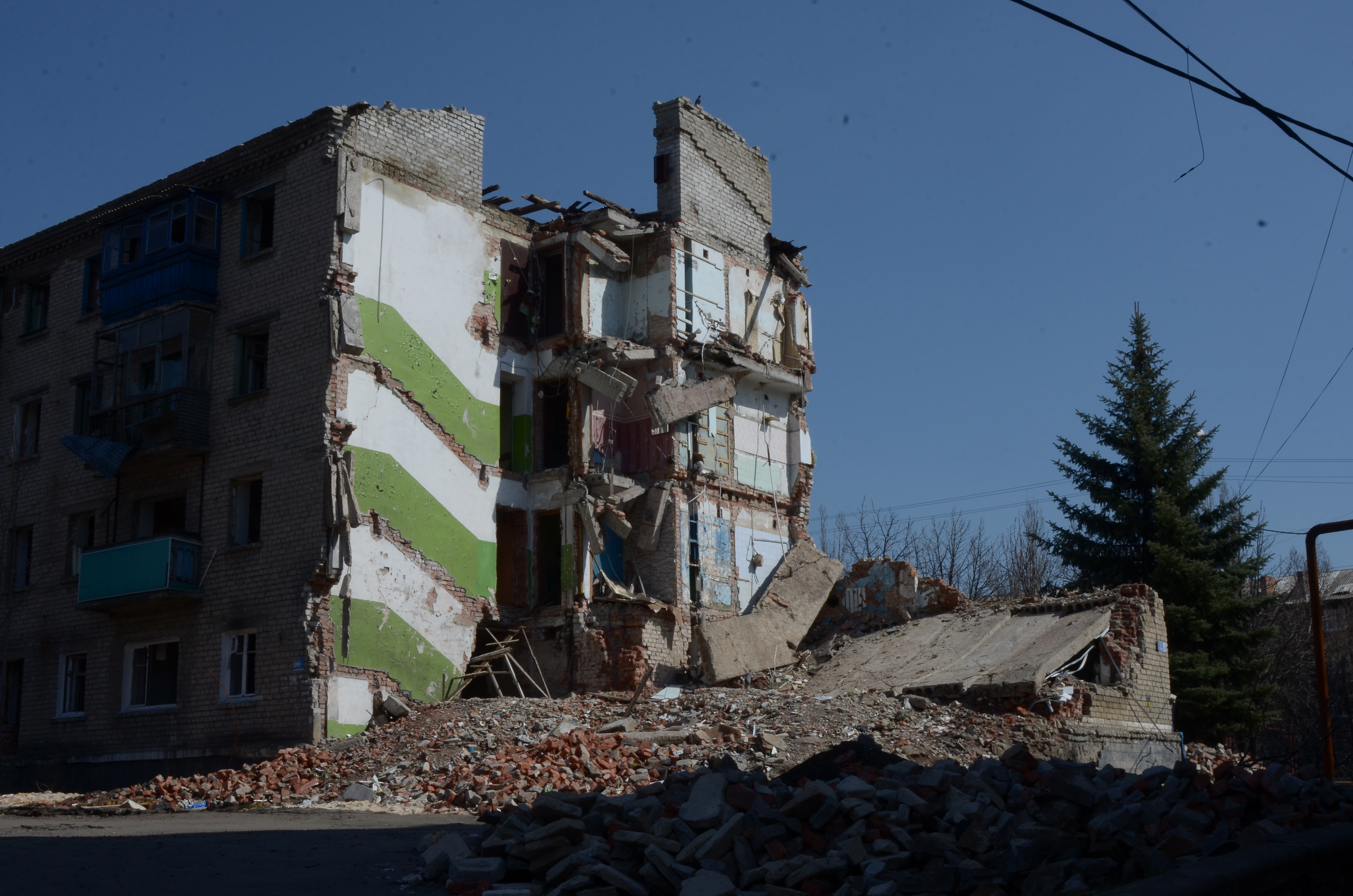
Damaged building in Snizhne, 6 August 2014

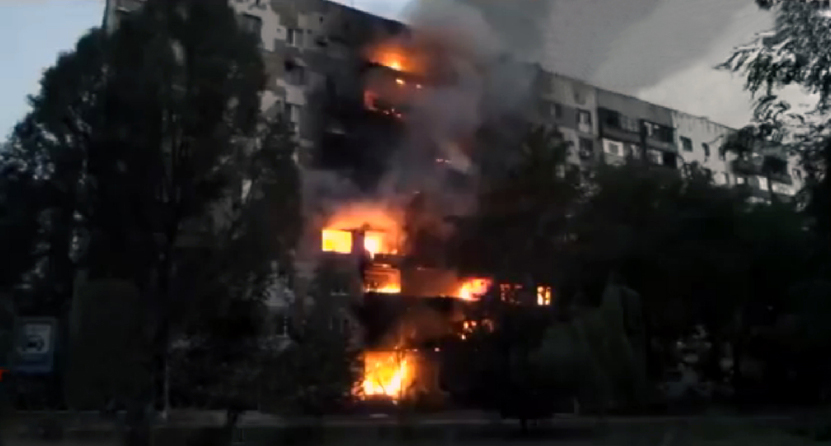
A burning block of flats in Shakhtarsk, 3 August 2014

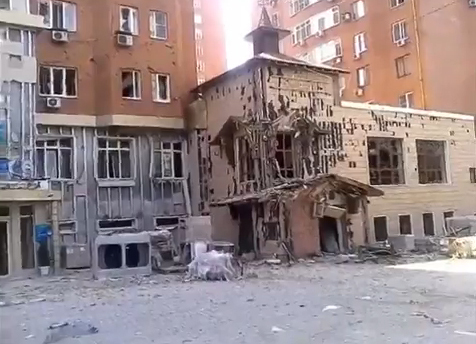
A damaged building in Donetsk, 7 August 2014

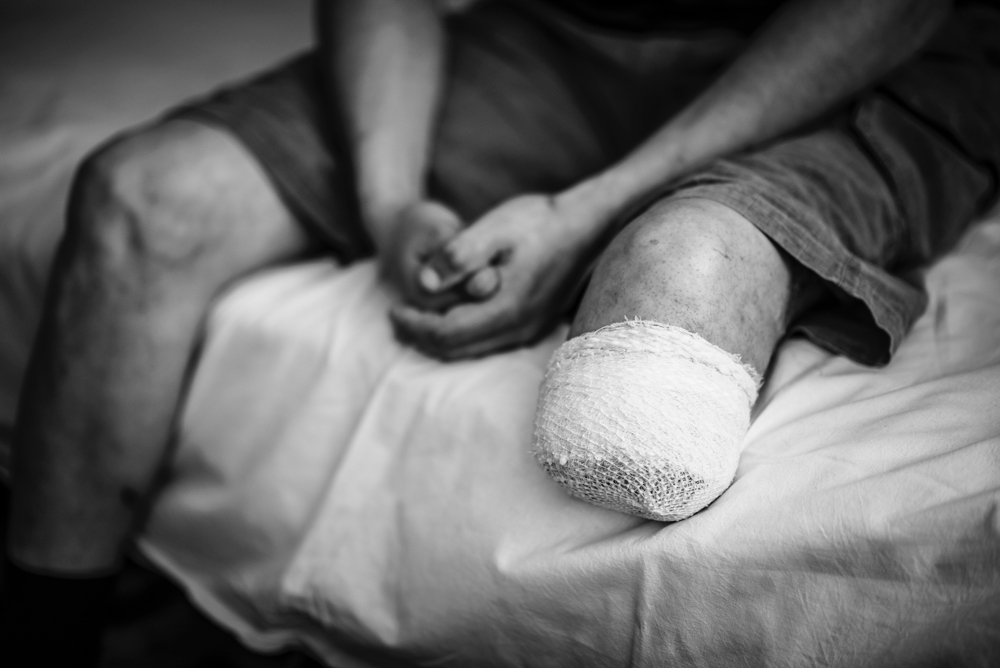
Man with an amputated leg in Kyiv Hospital. Photo displayed at an exhibition by Still Miracle Photography in London

=== 2022–present ===
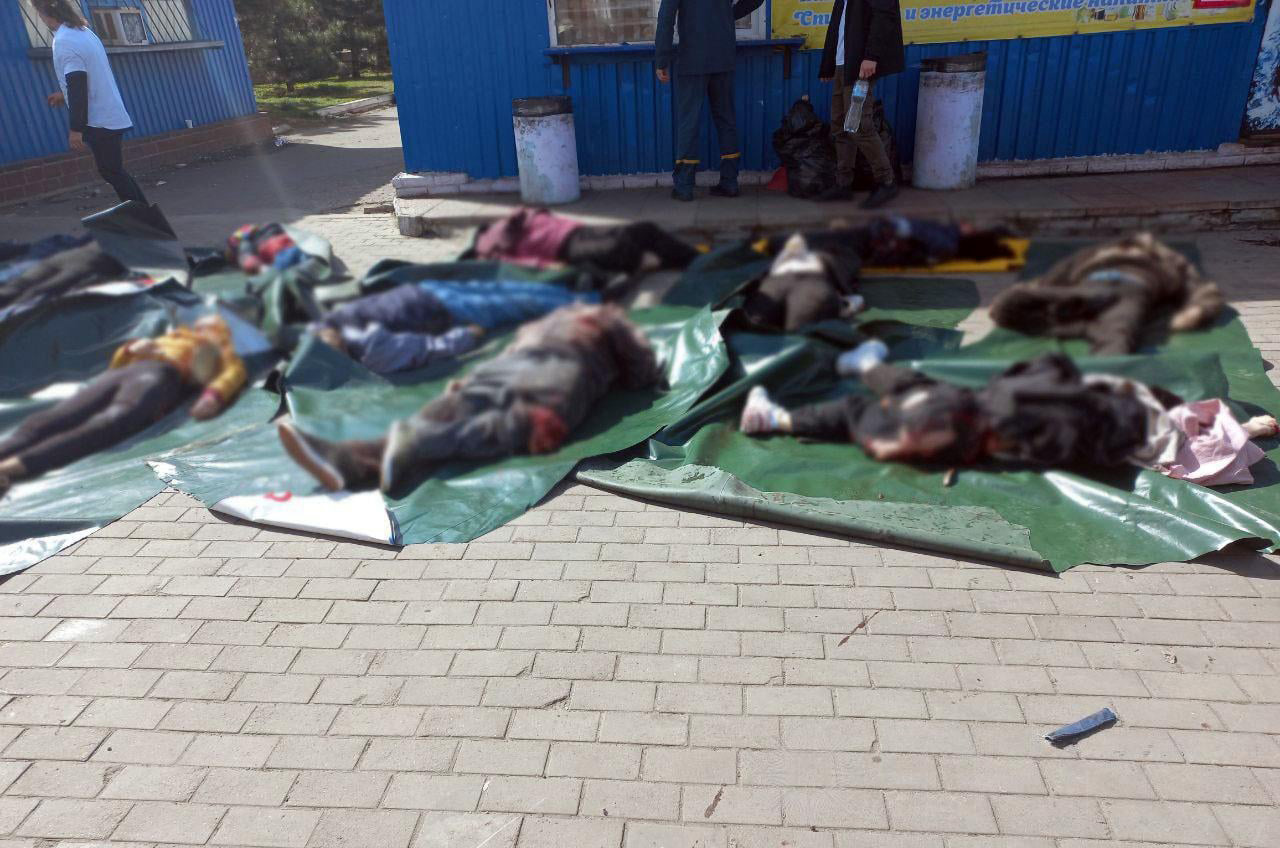
Dead Ukrainian civilians after the Kramatorsk railway station attack

On 24 February 2022, Russian forces invaded and attacked Ukraine from the north, south and east, which was interpreted as a form of Russian irredentism. The Russian invasion became the deadliest European war in the last 80 years. HRW and Amnesty International accused Russia of using imprecise cluster munitions in civilian areas, including near hospitals and schools, which constitute unlawful attacks with weapons that indiscriminately kill and maim. The UN High Commissioner for Human Rights condemned Russia's military action as a violation of international law. Amnesty International labeled it an act of aggression that is a crime under international law. Numerous war crimes were recorded, including murder or willful killings, torture, persecution, deportation or forced transfer, looting, rape against Ukrainian women, terror, enforced disappearance, starvation, attacks on civilians, unlawful airstrikes or attacks against civilian objects, wanton destruction not justified by military necessity including that of protected objects such as hospitals and cultural property, arbitrary detention, forceful conscription of nationals of the hostile party to take part in the operations of war directed against their own country, Russia transferring its civilian population into the territory it occupies, and cruel, inhuman or degrading treatment of POWs.

Russian forces' widespread and repeated targeting of Ukraine's energy infrastructure appears primarily designed to instill terror among the population in violation of the laws of war.

— Human Rights Watch, 6 December 2022

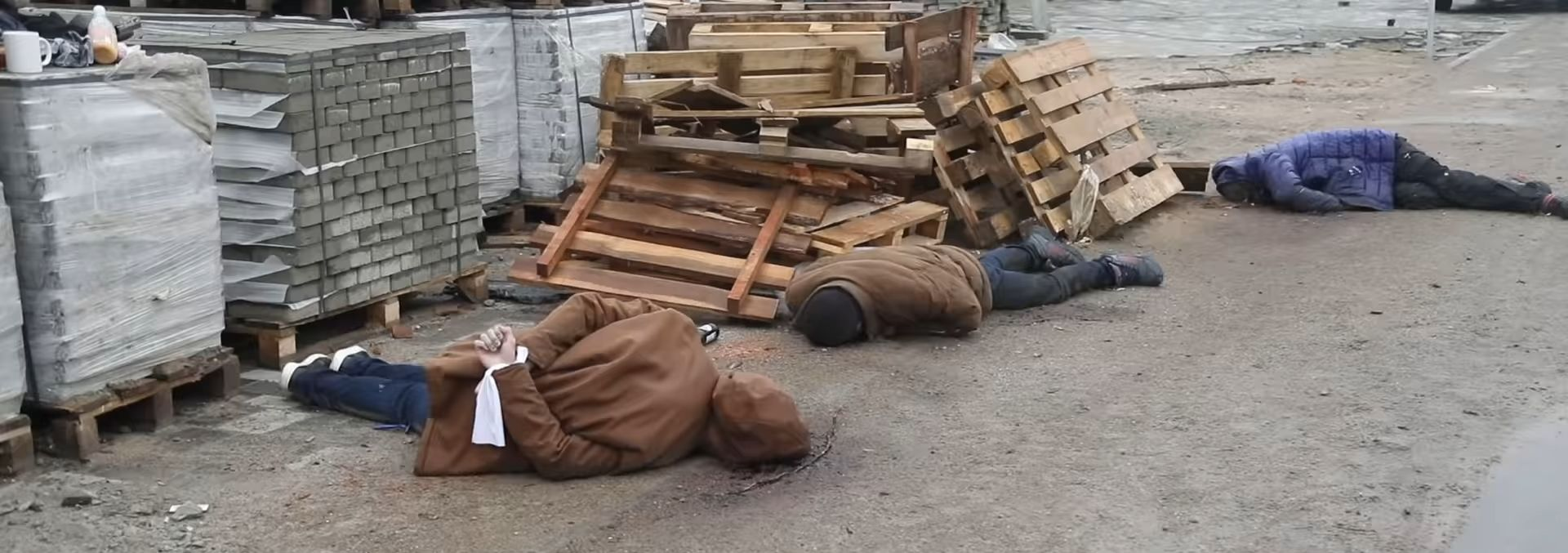
Bucha massacre, an example of murder of civilians

Among the targets of Russian airstrikes was Ukraine's capital Kyiv, a city of some 3 million people. Kindergartens and orphanages were also shelled. Russian forces were accused of a campaign of terror against Ukrainians. On 3 March 2022, Russian forces were reportedly looting across Kherson and selling stolen Ukrainian grain on the world market to finance the war. During the Siege of Mariupol, the city was destroyed by shelling and cut off from electricity, food and water. A 6-year-old girl was reported to have died from dehydration under the ruins of her home in Mariupol on 8 March. During the assault on Irpin, the Russian forces indiscriminately fired at refugees trying to flee across a collapsed bridge. A family of four was killed by a mortar strike.

During the Battle of Kharkiv, the city was destroyed by Russian shelling, including a boarding school for blind people. Out of a population of 1.8 million, only 500,000 people remained in Kharkiv by 7 March 2022. On 28 February 2022, a Russian cluster bomb attack killed 9 civilians and wounded 37 more in Kharkiv. On 3 March, 47 civilians were killed in Chernihiv, most of whom were standing in line at a food store, waiting for bread, when a Russian air strike with eight unguided aerial bombs hit them. In the Mariupol hospital airstrike, three people were killed, including a young girl; whereas hundreds died in the Mariupol theatre airstrike, used as an air raid shelter. Following the withdrawal of Russian forces from the E-40 highway around the Kyiv area, BBC News discovered 13 dead bodies left lying on the road.

After the Russian forces left the area of Bucha after a month of occupation, on 1–3 April photos and videos emerged showing hundreds of killed people lying on the streets or in mass graves. The event triggered an international response as it was widely covered by journalists as the Bucha massacre.

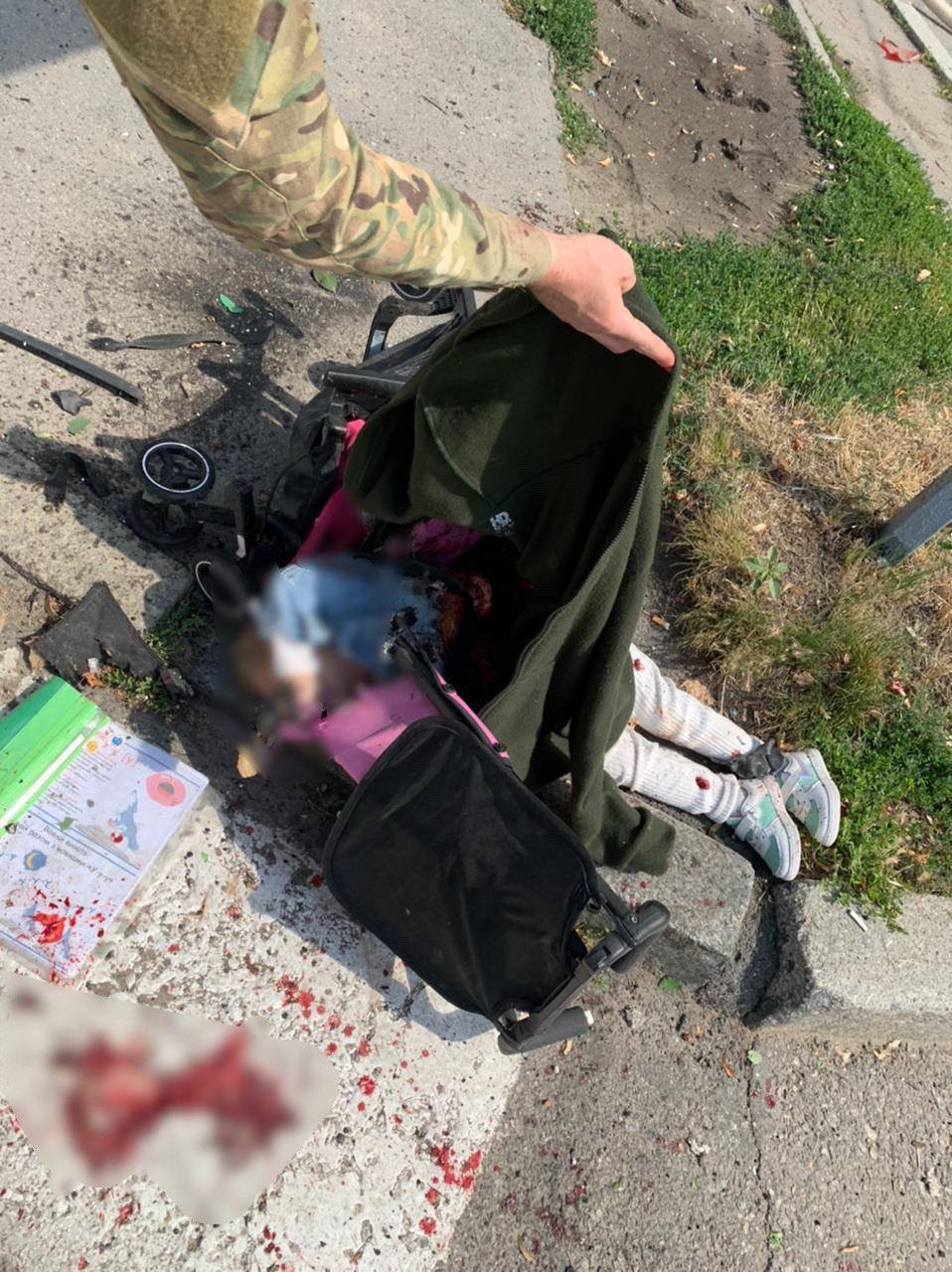
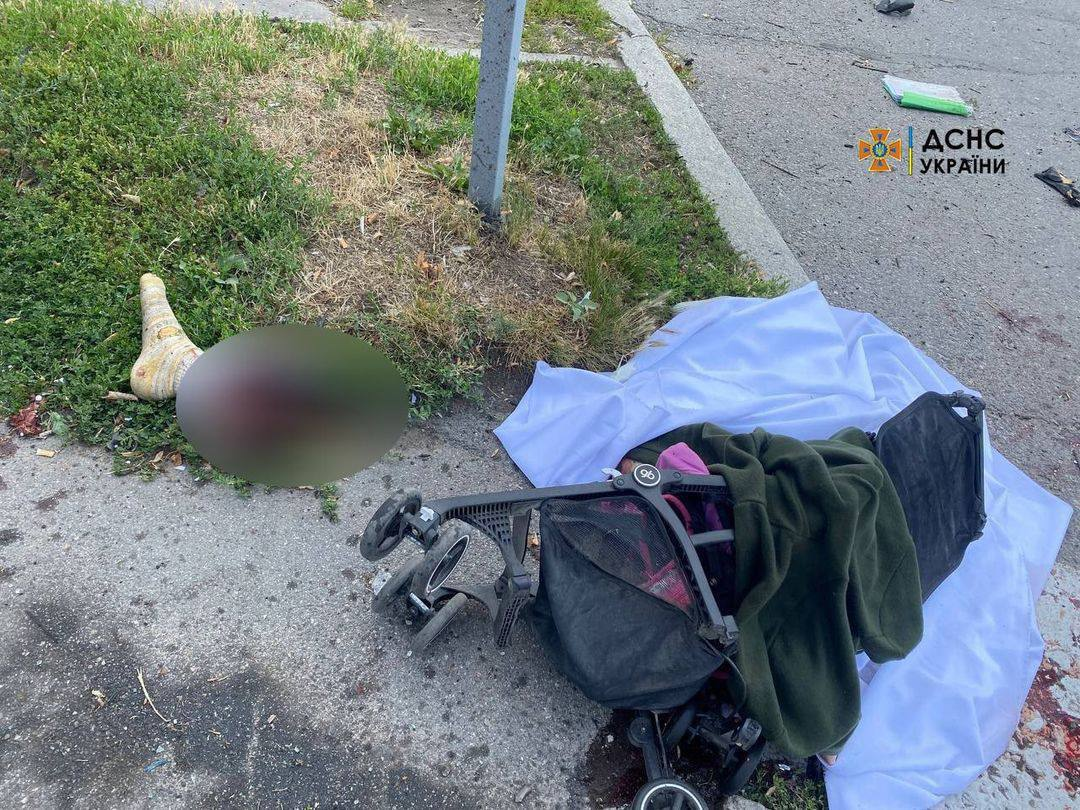
The body of the 4-year-old girl Liza Dmitrieva (left) and the severed part of her mother's leg (right) after the Russian missile strike on Vinnytsia in July 2022. Liza became one of the symbols of Russian atrocities in Ukraine.

Thousands of civilians were killed by Russia's indiscriminate shelling and missiles strikes against civilian areas: in Borordianka, Kramatorsk, Vinnytsia, Chasiv Yar, Serhiivka, and others. On 7 May 2022, the Bilohorivka school bombing killed dozens of people sheltering in the basement. Odesa was bombed continuously for months. On 15 June 2022, OHCHR expressed concerns over reports that Ukrainian children were forcibly deported to Russia, where they were being sent for rushed adoption, stating that these "do not appear to include steps for family reunification or respect the best interests of the child". UNICEF similarly declared that "adoptions should never occur during or immediately after emergencies".

The people of Ukraine have suffered unimaginable horror during this war of aggression over the last 12 months. Let us be clear: the hands of Vladimir Putin and his armed forces are stained with blood.

— Amnesty International, 22 February 2023

Russian filtration camps were set up to detain, interrogate and torture Ukrainians suspected to have connections with Ukrainian government. On 14 July 2022, OSCE released a report finding that Russia was guilty of murder, rape, abduction and deportations of Ukrainian civilians, including the transfer of 2,000 children from orphanages and institutions to Russia, even though many have relatives in Ukraine, which qualifies as a widespread and systematic attack against a civilian population, and is a crime against humanity.

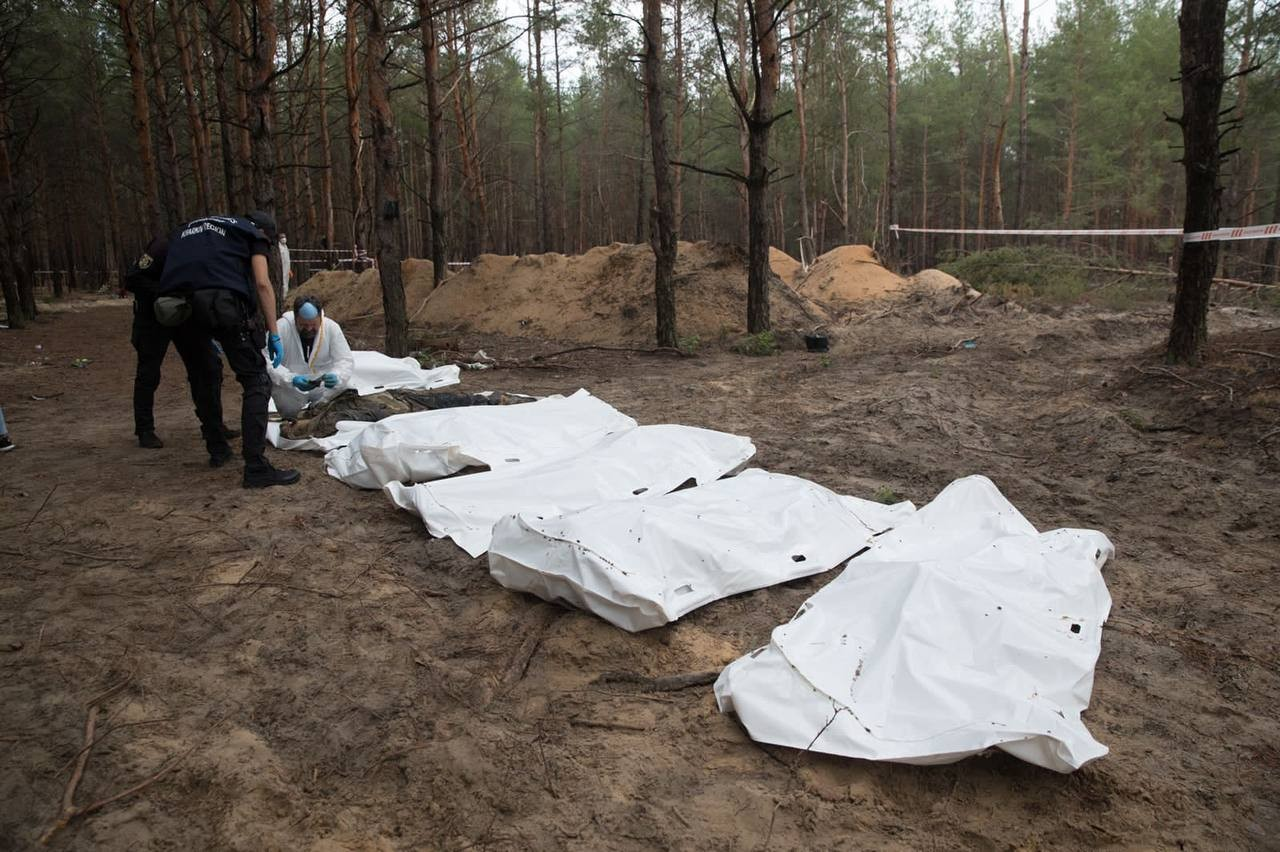
Izium mass grave exhumations, September 2022

Videos of the beheading of a Ukrainian prisoner of war in summer 2022 and castration of another one in Pryvillia were widely condemned by the international community. Several scholars declared that Russia was committing genocide in Ukraine. This assertion was corroborated by a report by New Lines Institute for Strategy and Policy and Raoul Wallenberg Centre for Human Rights, which inferred that Russia breached two articles of the 1948 Genocide Convention.

On 14 September 2022, Ukrainian authorities discovered a mass grave with 440 corpses in Izium after the Russian forces withdrew from the area. The events were described as the Izium massacre. Since October–November 2022, Russian forces used missiles and drones to systematically attack Ukraine's electrical grids, leaving millions of civilians without heating, electricity, water, or other basic utilities during winter. These attacks on critical civilian infrastructure were deemed as illegal and as war crimes. This disrupted the power and water supply to 10,700,000 Ukrainian homes at one point in winter. On 14 January 2023, a Russian missile strike was fired directly at a nine-storey residential building in Dnipro, killing over 40 civilians and making over 1,000 people homeless. On 14 April 2023, Russian S-300 missiles struck residential buildings in Sloviansk on Good Friday, killing a dozen civilians. On 3 May 2023, Russia shelled a train station and a grocery store in Kherson during the busiest hour of the day, killing over 20 civilians.

The Russian Army also perpetrated wanton destruction of Ukrainian cities and cultural destruction, including confiscating and burning Ukrainian books, historical archives, and damaging more than 240 Ukrainian heritage sites, described as a "urbicide". 90% of Mariupol was destroyed by the Russian 2022 siege. Marinka and Popasna were similarly completely destroyed and were described as "post-apocalyptic wasteland" and "ghost towns". The destruction of the Kakhovka Dam on 6 June 2023 caused flooding and environmental devastation, with some accusing Russia of ecocide.

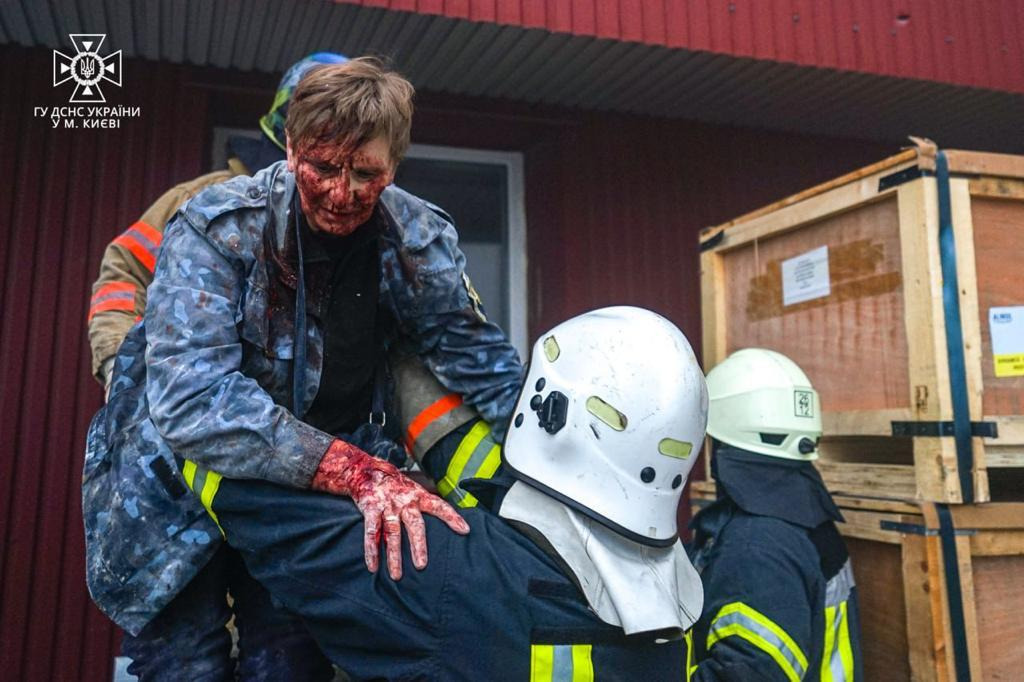
Firefighters evacuating the wounded in Kyiv after the 29 December 2023 missile attack

UN's Humanitarian Coordinator for Ukraine condemned Russia's bombings on numerous occasions, including in Kramatorsk and Chernihiv in 2023. HRW labelled the Lyman cluster bombing a war crime. On the night of 29 December 2023, Russia launched the most massive missile and drones attack against Ukraine, leaving dozens of civilians dead. At least 158 missiles were fired across Ukraine, targeting Kyiv, Lviv, Kharkiv, Khmelnytskyi, Dnipropetrovsk, Sumy, Cherkasy, Odesa and Zaporizhzhia. UN Secretary-General António Guterres condemned Russia for attacking civilians and civilian infrastructure.

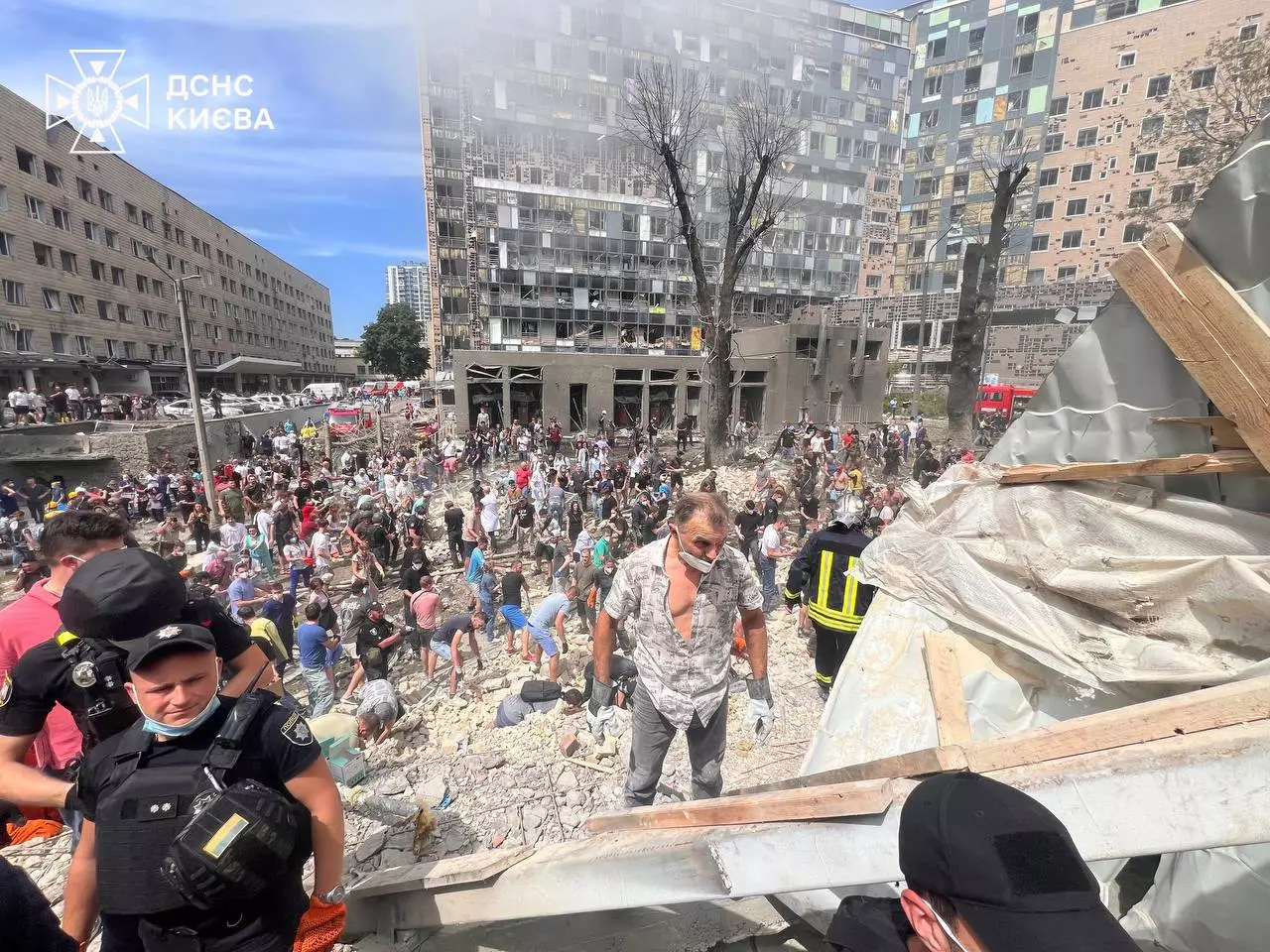
Devastation around Okhmatdyt children's hospital after the Russian attack

A UN report concluded that the Russian forces tortured and killed at least 32 Ukrainian POWs between December 2023 and February 2024. On 22 March 2024, Russian forces perpetrated another wave of strikes with drones and missiles against Ukraine, leaving 1.5 million without electricity, which the UN condemned as a violation of international humanitarian law. On 17 April 2024, a Russian missile strike hit an eight-storey building in Chernihiv, killing 18 civilians.

On 2 May 2024, the US said Russian forces used banned chemical weapons on the battlefront, such as chloropicrin, including in Avdiivka.

On 25 May 2024, the Russian forces perpetrated missile strikes against a shopping center in Kharkiv, killing several civilians inside. The UN condemned Russia for it and called for an end of attacks on civilian objects.

On 8 July 2024, Russian forces bombed several Ukrainian cities with Kh-47M2 Kinzhal missiles, including Kyiv, Kryvyi Rih and Pokrovsk. A direct missile strike hit the oncology department of the children's hospital, Okhmatdyt, in Kyiv, killing several inside. The UN condemned the attack. Amnesty International rejected Kremlin's claims that the Ukrainian air defence accidentally bombed the children's hospital, adding it "seeks to deflect from Russia's responsibility for killing civilians and destroying medical facilities". On 4 September 2024, Russian forces carried out airstrikes against Lviv, including homes, schools and clinics, leaving seven dead, among them a mother and her three daughters.

In August 2024, UN official Danielle Bell claimed that 95% of Ukrainian prisoners of war had suffered from Russian tortures (e.g. beating, using electric shock or were strip naked). The UN condemned Russia for its 1 October 2024 marketplace attack in Kherson during the busiest time of the day, which left five civilians dead. Starting from October 2024, Russian forces started using grenade-dropping drones to hunt for civilians in Kherson, attacking and killing them in parks, bus stops or while cycling and walking on the streets. Afterwards, they would post videos on social media.

19 November 2024 marked 1,000 days since the Russian full-scale invasion of Ukraine, with 65% of Ukraine's own energy production capacity having been destroyed up to that point. Russia again intensified the illegal strikes against energy infrastructure ahead of the 2024/2025 winter.

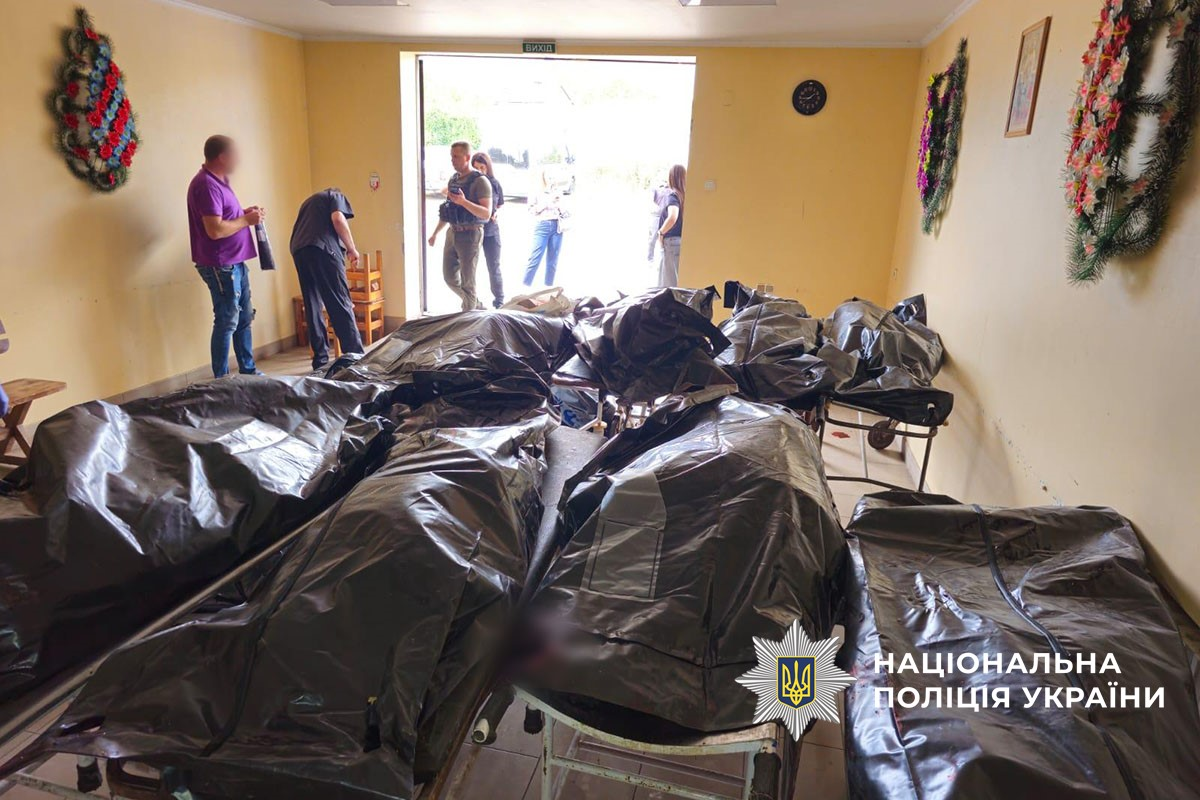
Fatalities after the 2025 Yarova attack

On 8 January 2025, two Russian aerial bombs struck a Zaporizhzhia industrial facility as workers were leaving from work, killing 13 civilians and injuring 110. On 18 January 2025, Russia launched at least 39 Shahed drones and four ballistic missiles against Kyiv, killing three people. By 2025, 70% of civilian deaths in the Kherson region were caused by short-range drones, but these drone attacks were also recorded in Kharkiv, Sumy, Dnipro, Mykolaiv, Donetsk and Zaporizhzhia. The 2025 Sumy airstrike on Palm Sunday, which killed 34 people including two children in the city centre, was condemned by the UN. March 2025 saw a 50% increase of civilian casualties compared to March 2024.

On 1 February 2025, a missile exploded and killed 15 civilians of an apartment building in Poltava, 240 km away from the battlefront. On 4 February 2025, a Russian missile hit the Izium city council building, killing six civilians. On 5 March 2025, a missile struck a hotel in Kryvyi Rih, killing six civilians. On 4 April 2025, a Russian missile detonated above a playground in the same city, killing 20 civilins, including 9 children playing there. HRW deemed these attacks indiscriminate and disproportionate, possible war crimes. Russian forces dropped glide bombs on the Bilenkivska prison on 28 July 2025, killing 16 inmates inside. They also struck a hospital and maternity ward in Kamianske, killing three and injuring 22 people inside. On 9 September 2025, a Russian missile strike killed over 20 pensioners in Yarova who were lining up outside to receive their pensions.

On 14 October 2025, Russian forces targeted a UN humanitarian aid convoy delivering aid to Bilozerka with attack drones. Two trucks were damaged. On 22 October 2025, Russian missile and drone attacks killed six civilians, including two children, while targeting the center of Kharkiv, hitting a kindergarten.

An October 2025 UN report confirmed Russian forces deported civilians from the occupied Zaporizhzhia Oblast to territory still under control of the Ukrainian government. Ukrainians on Russian-occupied territories were arrested, detained, tortured, their documents confiscated, under the accusation of sabotage, that they were pro-Ukrainian or refused to take a Russian passport. They were made to walk between 10–15 kilometers from the occupied territory through a dangerous area with landmines and trenches, while hearing sounds of shots and shelling. Some were deported as far as Georgia, and banned to return to Russia and Russian-occupied territory for 20 to 40 years.

On 14 May 2026, Russian forces bombed across the whole Ukraine continuously for 24 hours with drones, ballistic missiles, air-launched ballistic missiles and cruise missiles, with targets including residential buildings, a school, a veterinary clinic and other civilian infrastructure. On 8 October 2026, a glide bomb caused the Kramatorsk bus massacre. On 2 November 2026, at least 9 FAB-3000 guided missiles were used to bomb the Komyshuvakha village in Zaporizhzhia Oblast, including a school used to distribute humanitarian aid. Reports state that at least 26 people were killed in the strike.

==== Total casualties ====
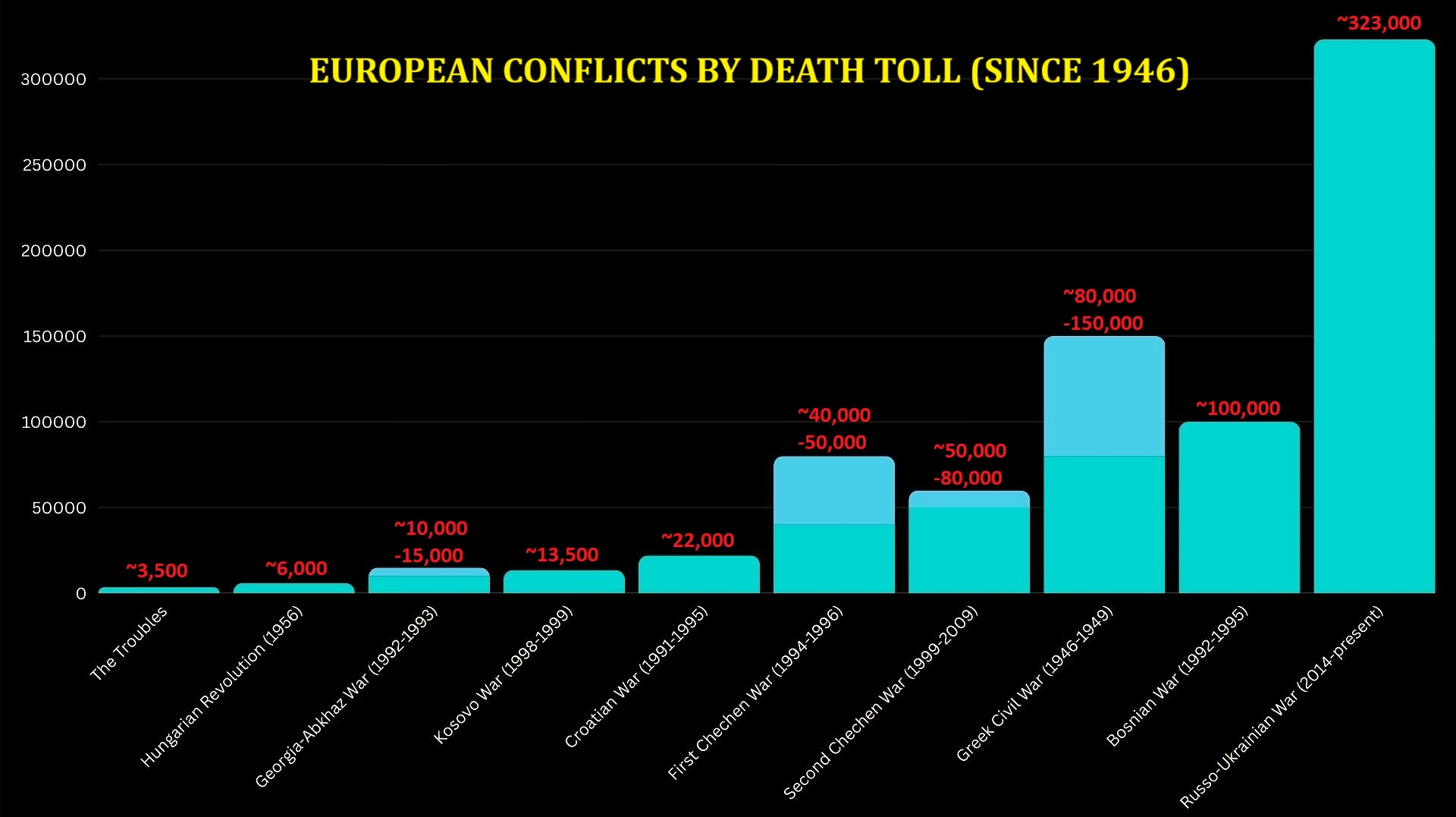
Russo-Ukrainian war death toll compared to other modern European conflicts

By 30 March 2022, the UN reported that 4 million refugees fled Ukraine, that 50 hospitals in the country were targeted, and that Russia used cluster munition in at least 24 instances. Russia's attack against Ukraine forced 14 million people to flee their homes, of which 7.8 million fled the country, sparking the largest refugee crisis of the 21st century. On 22 April 2022, the UN recorded at least 2,343 killed civilians in Ukraine, of which 92.3% were attributable to the Russian armed forces. By 21 February 2023, a year into the invasion, the UN recorded 8,006 killed civilians, including 487 children. By October 2026, the number of civilian fatalities verified by the UN was 17,257, including 835 children. In February 2024, Ukrainian officials estimated up to 50,000 Ukrainian civilians were killed in the Russian invasion. US officials estimated around 70,000 dead Ukrainian soldiers and 120,000 dead Russian soldiers.

Ukrainian average mortality rate was 8.7/1000 people in 2020, and jumped to 19.8/1000 in 2024, whereas Russia's mortality rate that same year was 14.1/1000, ranking them as #1 and #9, respectively, on the list of countries with the highest mortality rates. In August 2024, Haaretz estimated 172,000 people died in the Russian invasion of Ukraine. In February 2025, Quincy Institute for Responsible Statecraft estimated 250,000 dead. The Economist estimated between 106,000 and 140,000 dead Russian soldiers by June 2024, a death toll higher than all of Moscow's wars from 1946 to 2022 combined. By February 2026, The Economist updated its estimated range to 230,000-430,000 Russian soldier deaths and 100,000-140,000 Ukrainian soldiers deaths. Political scientist Neta Crawford estimated 323,000 dead in the war by October 2025, with an average rate of 7,690 killed per month—surpassing the average of 2,826 killed per month in the Gaza war and 772 killed in the War in Afghanistan (2001–2021). According to Crawford, while civilians accounted for 80 percent of the fatalities in the Gaza War and 26 percent in the War in Afghanistan, four percent of those killed in Ukraine were civilians. The Peace Research Institute Oslo estimated 81,000 total dead in 2022. Le Monde estimated 500,000 total deaths in the war by February 2026.

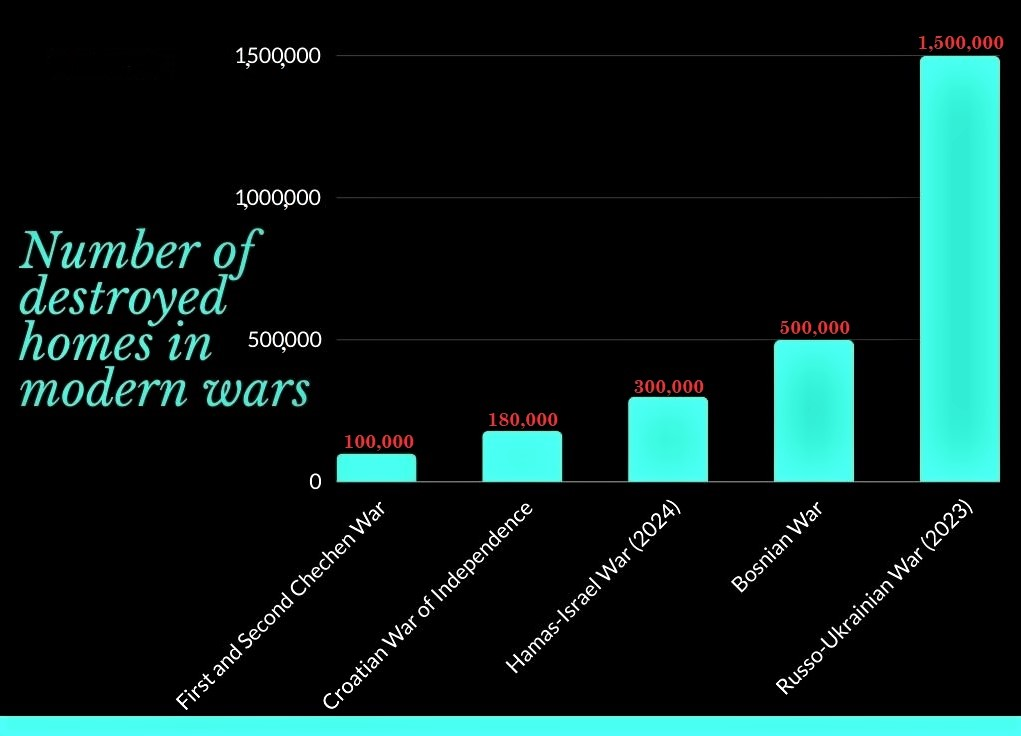
Total number of destroyed or damaged homes in Ukraine by 2023 compared to other modern wars

Carl Conetta, co-director of the Project on Defense Alternatives, estimated that the war directly took the lives of 20,000 Ukrainian civilians and indirectly another 20,000 (due to such effects as lack of access to essential health care) by May 2023, reaching the levels of death toll comparable to Yugoslav Wars and the worst months of the Iraq War.

From 24 February 2022 to 30 June 2023, OHCHR assessed that 90.5% of all civilian fatalities were killed by explosive weapons with wide area effects, and that 84.2% of them were recorded on the Ukrainian-controlled territory. No region in Ukraine was spared from Russian attacks. By one estimate, only 3% of all Russian missiles, drones and bombs hit military targets, while 97% hit civilians targets. By November 2025, the UN estimated 2.5 million housing units in Ukraine were either damaged or destroyed in the Russo-Ukrainian War, corresponding to 10% of Ukraine's total housing stock. By comparison, approximately 2 million homes were damaged or destroyed in Ukraine during World War II. 13% of all Ukrainian housing units was damaged or destroyed by February 2025, whereas the post-war reconstruction was estimated at $524 billion. Additionally, around 174,000 km^{2} (67,000 sq mi) of Ukraine was contaminated by landmines and explosive remnants.

In March 2024, the OHCHR Commission published a report concluding the following:

The Commission is concerned with the number, the geographic spread, and the gravity of human rights violations and corresponding international crimes which it has documented during its mandate. These have affected men, women, boys and girls of all backgrounds and ages. It has concluded that Russian authorities have committed numerous violations of international humanitarian law and violations of international human rights law, in addition to a wide range of war crimes, including the war crime of excessive incidental death, injury, or damage; wilful killings; torture; inhuman treatment; unlawful confinement; rape; as well as unlawful transfers and deportations. The Commission has also found that the Russian armed forces' waves of attacks, starting 10 October 2022, on Ukraine's energy-related infrastructure and the use of torture by Russian authorities may amount to crimes against humanity.

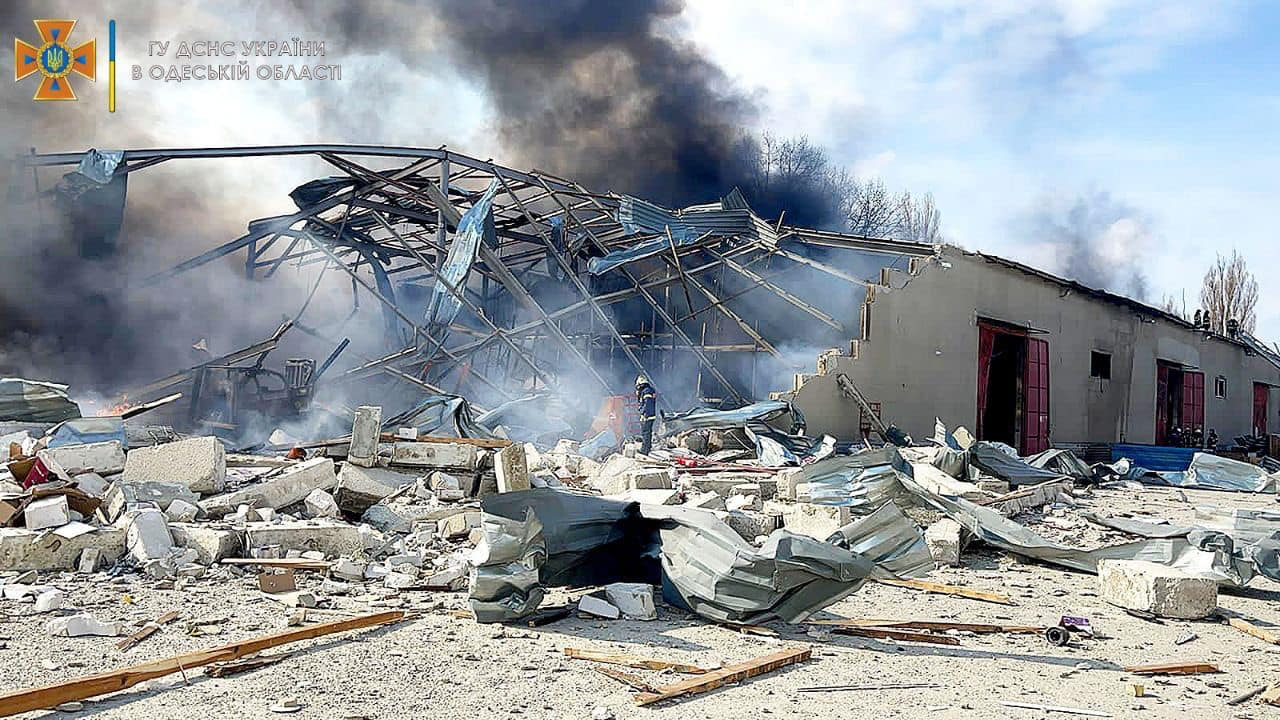
Aftermath of a Russian missile strike against warehouses in Odesa on 24 February 2022

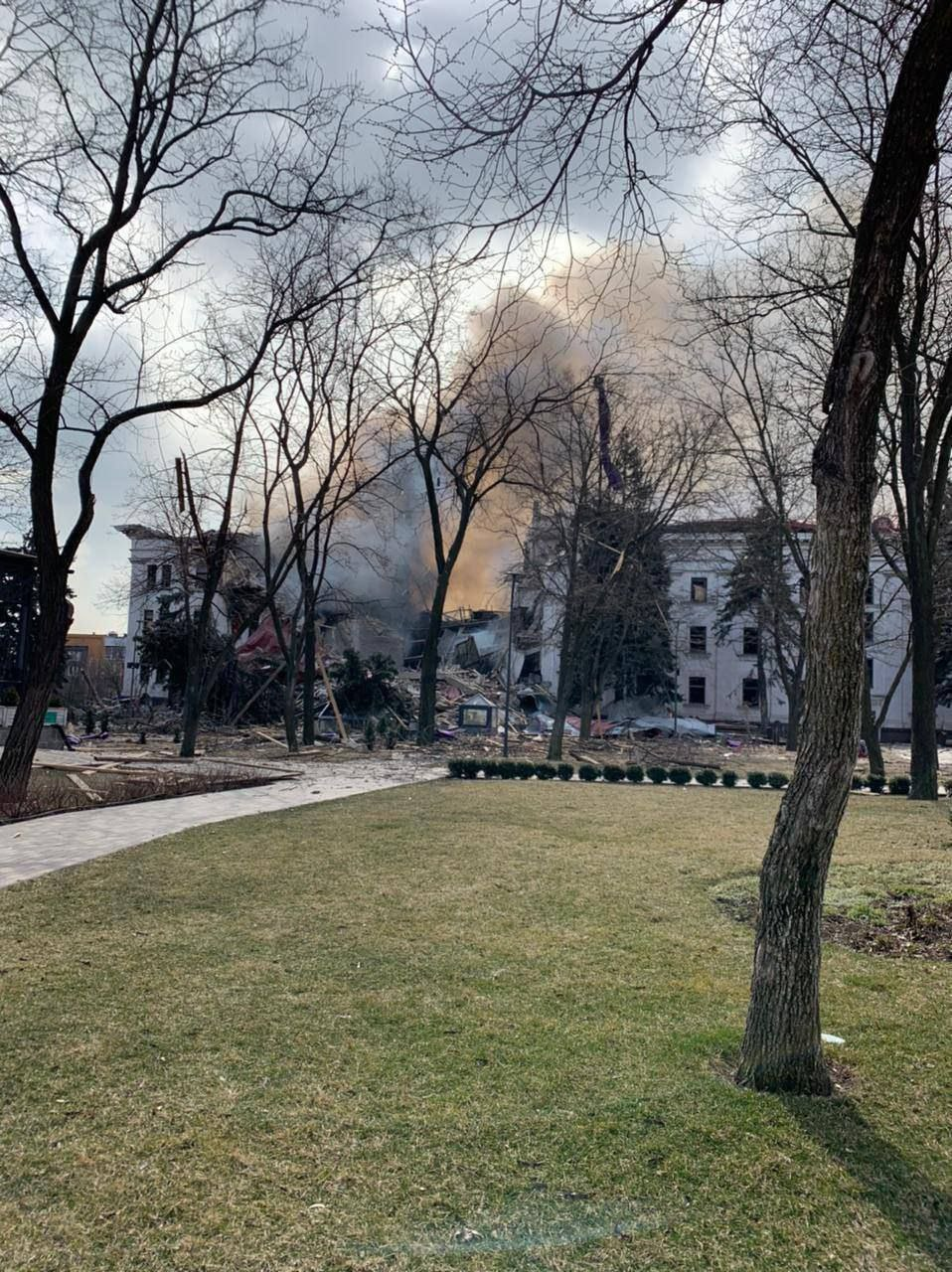
Mariupol Drama Theatre after a Russian airstrike

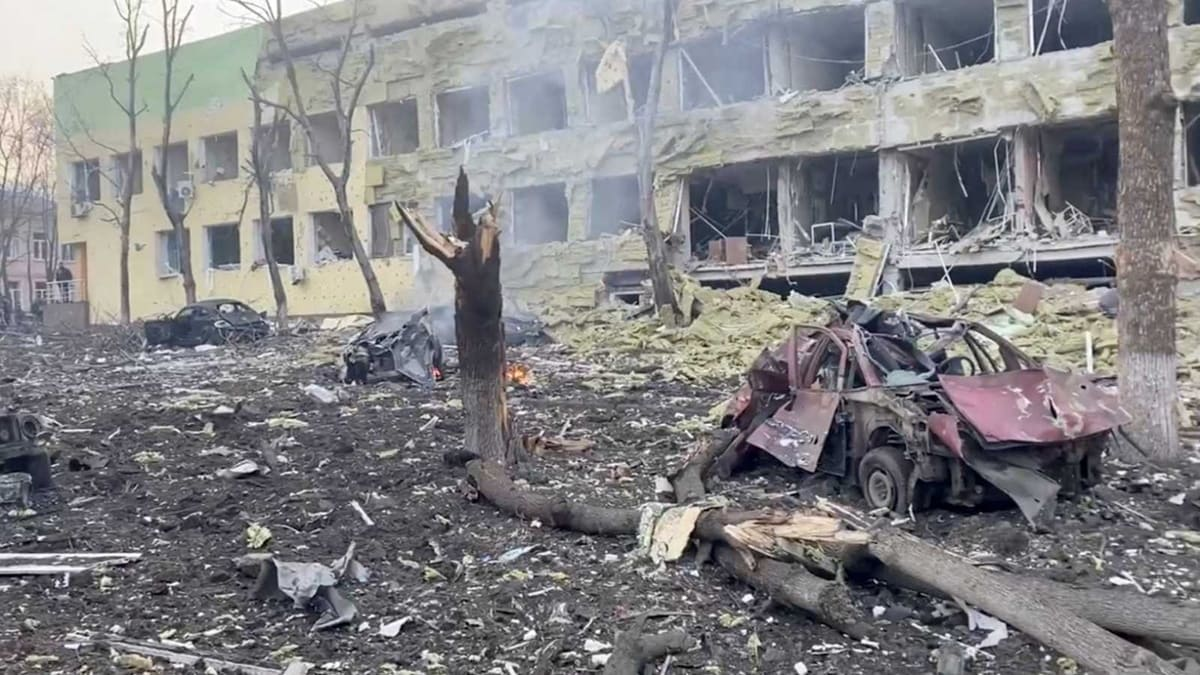
Aftermath of the Mariupol hospital airstrike

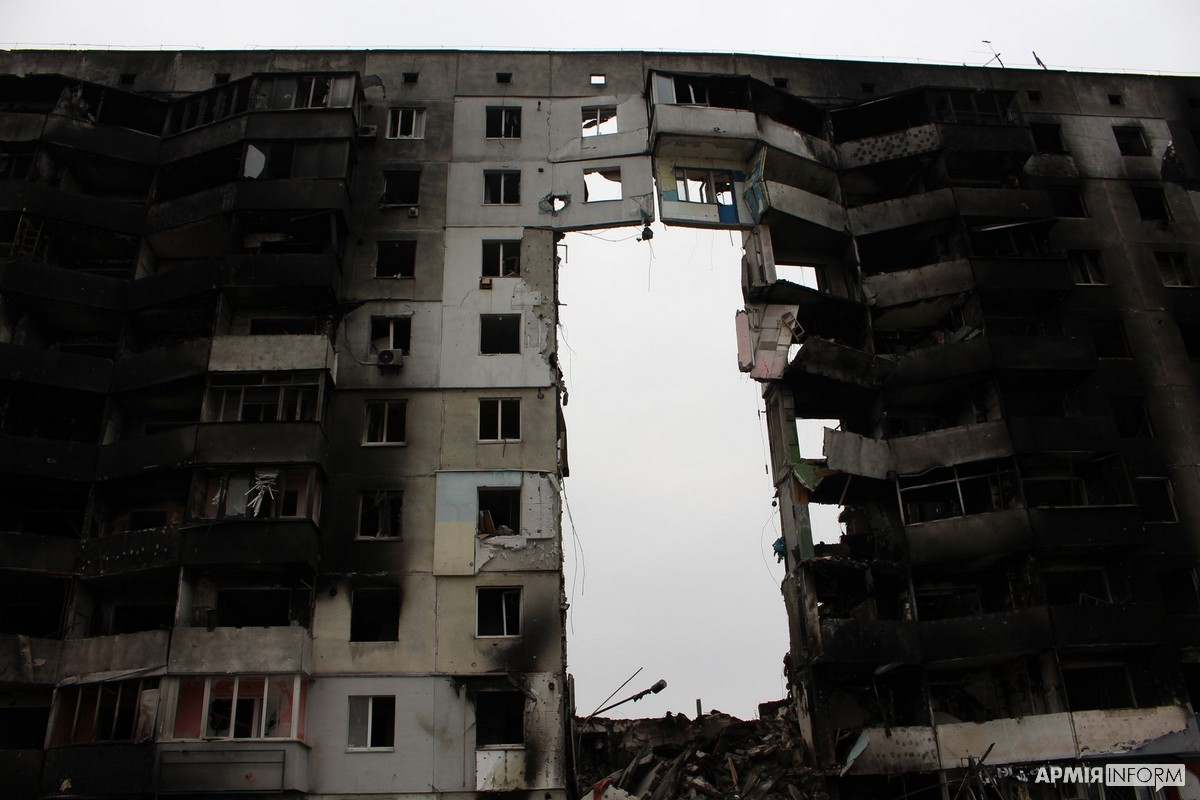
Bombing of Borodianka

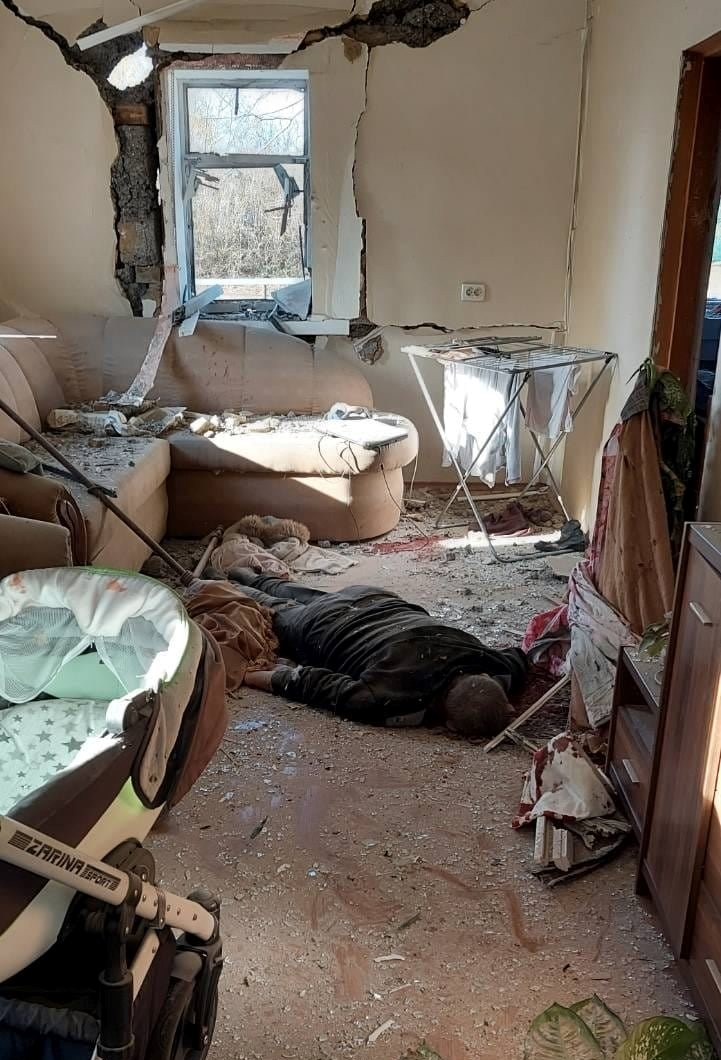
Ukrainian civilian killed during the Russian bombing of Chernihiv

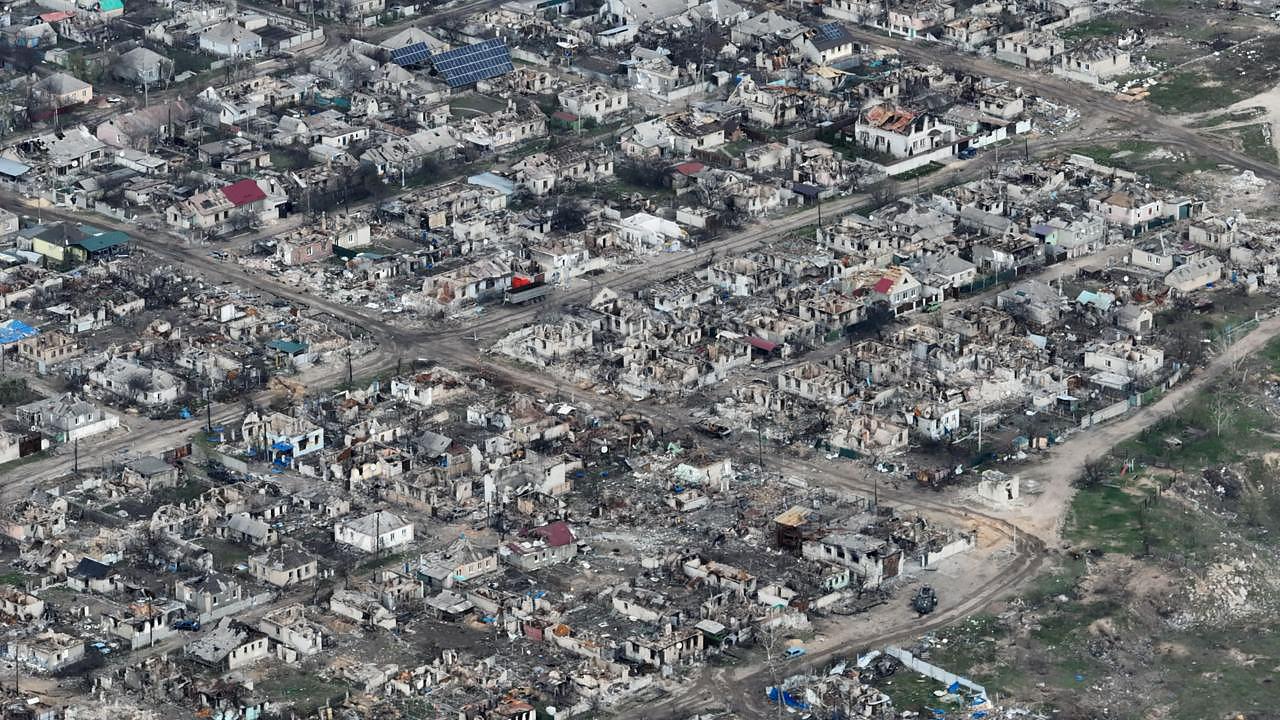
Ruins of Rubizhne after Russian shelling

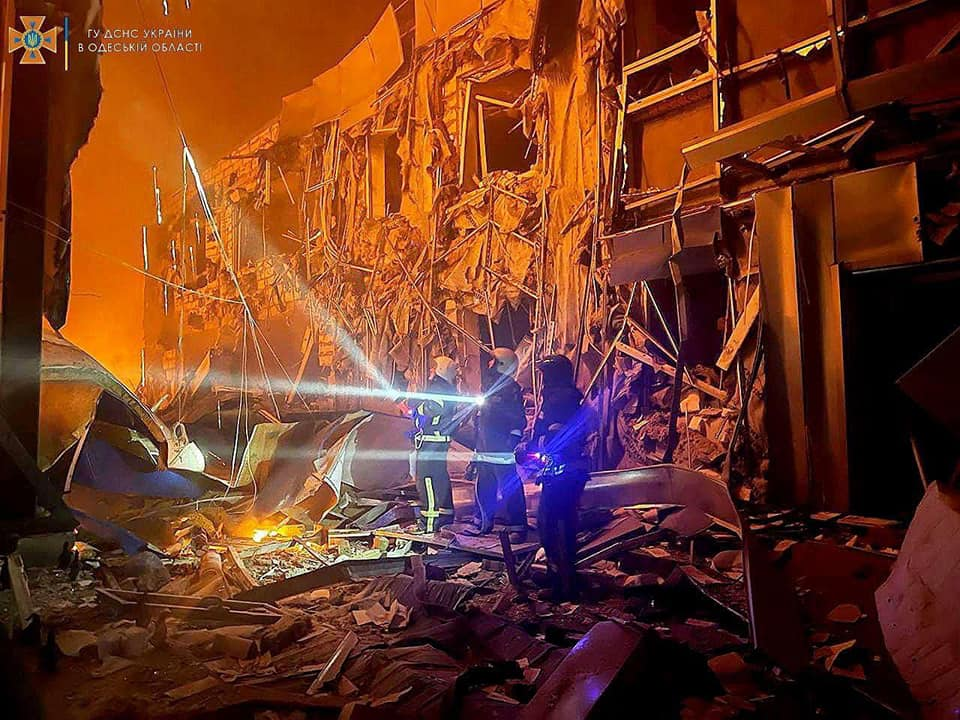
Riviera shopping mall near Odesa, 9 May 2022

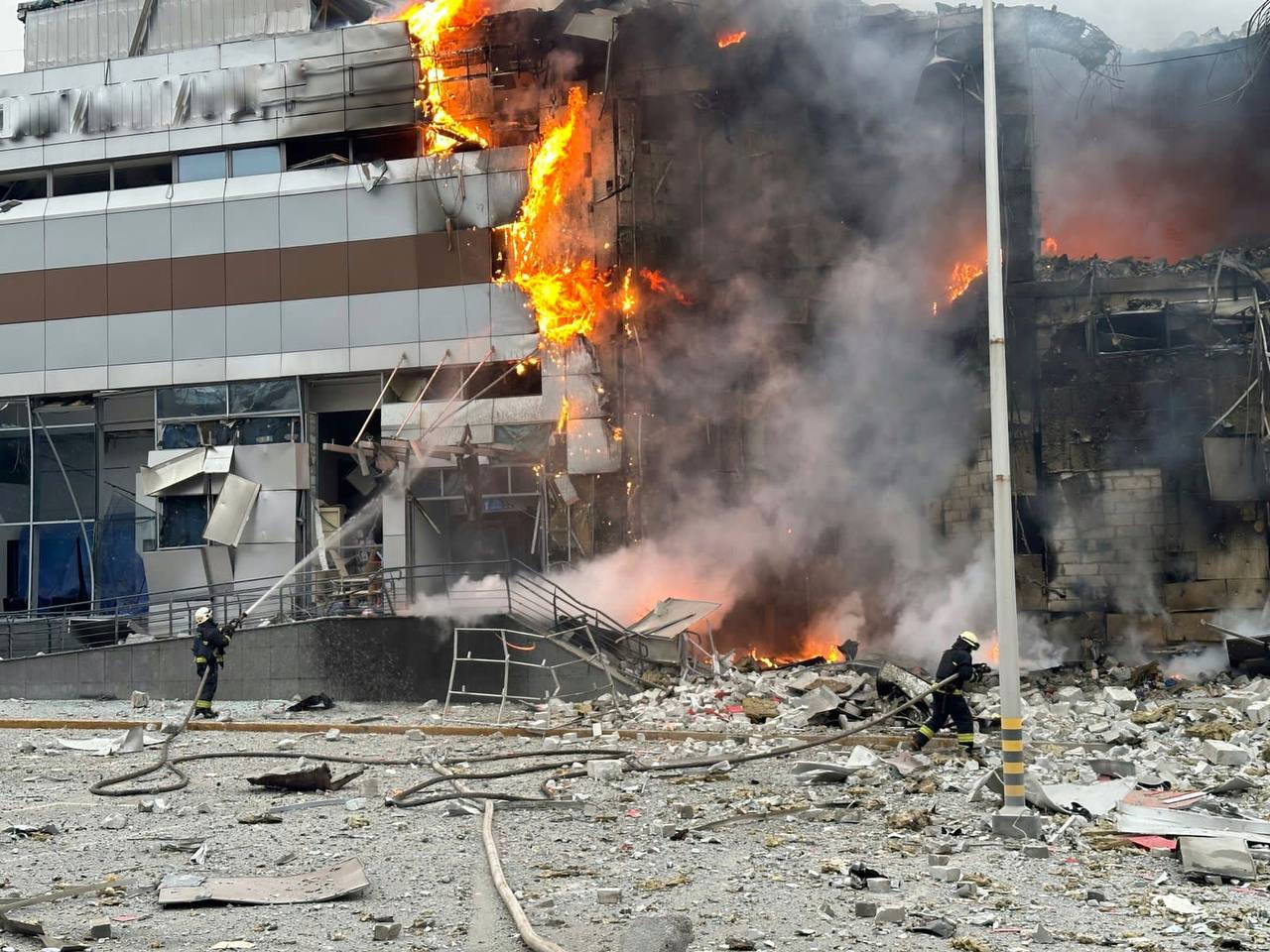
Aftermath of a missile strike on a shopping mall in Dnipro on 29 December 2023

== Syria ==
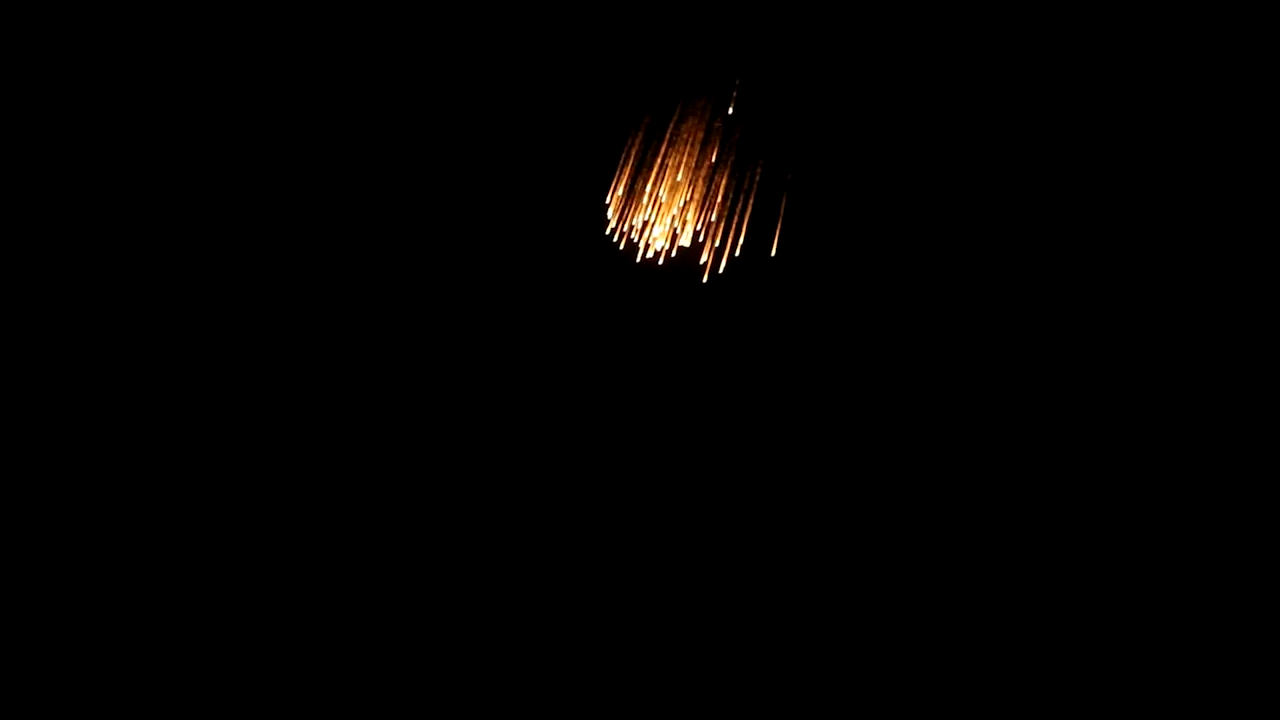
Russian aircraft drop firebombs in northern Aleppo in June 2016.

On 30 September 2015, Russian military intervened directly in the Syrian Civil War on the side of the pro-Russian government of Bashar al-Assad. According to Amnesty International, in late February 2016 Russian warplanes deliberately targeted civilians and rescue workers during their bombing campaign. The human rights group has documented attacks on schools, hospitals and civilian homes. Amnesty International also said that "Russia is guilty of some the most egregious war crimes" it had seen in decades. The director of Amnesty's crisis response program, Tirana Hassan, said that after bombing civilian targets, the Russian warplanes "loop around" for a second attack to target the humanitarian workers and civilians who are trying to help those have been injured in the first sortie.

In February 2016, Human Rights Watch (HRW) reported extensive use of cluster munitions by Syria and Russia, in violation of United Nations resolution 2139 of 22 February 2014, which demanded that all parties end "indiscriminate employment of weapons in populated areas". HRW said that "Russian or Syrian forces were responsible for the attacks" and that the munitions were "manufactured in the former Soviet Union or Russia" and that some were of a type that had "not been documented as used in Syria" prior to Russia's involvement in the war, which they claimed, suggested that "either Russian aircraft dropped them or Russian authorities recently provided the Syrian government with more cluster munitions, or both". HRW also noted that while neither Russia nor Syria are parties to the Cluster Munitions Convention, the use of such munitions contradicts statements issued by the Syrian government that they would refrain from using them. Russian indiscriminate bombings against civilians, using banned cluster bombs or firebombing, were often deemed as a violation of international law, mostly during the battle of Aleppo and siege of Eastern Ghouta. Several parallels were drawn between the 2016 destructions in Aleppo with those from Grozny in 2000, described by some as indicating a joint policy of "take no prisoners". Between May and July 2019, heavy Russian bombardments killed 544 civilians in the assault on Idlib. On 22 July 2019, the Ma'arrat al-Numan market bombing killed 43 civilians. On 16 August 2019, Russian fighter jets perpetrated an airstrike on Hass refugee camp, killing 20 civilians.

On 6 March 2018, the United Nations Human Rights Council published a public report confirming that the Atarib market bombing was perpetrated by the Russian military. A Russian fixed-wing aircraft using unguided weapons, including blast weapons, were used against this location. The report concluded that using such heavy weapons on densely populated civilian areas may amount to a war crime. On 2 February 2017, the Office of the United Nations High Commissioner for Human Rights (OHCHR) issued a report on the battle of Aleppo, confirming that Russia used cluster and incendiary weapons. It concluded that their use on densely populated area in eastern Aleppo "amounts to the use of an inherently indiscriminate weapon, constituting the war crime of indiscriminate attacks in a civilian populated area".

The Russian intervention ended in December 2024 with a defeat and the fall of the Assad regime. The Syrian Observatory for Human Rights assessed that Russian air strikes and artillery shells killed around 8,000 civilians in Syria. Airwars estimate of civilian deaths is in the range of 4,431–6,522.

== Central African Republic ==
On 27 October 2021, the UN experts of the Human Rights Council warned that Russia's paramilitary Wagner Group "violently harassed and intimidated civilians, including peacekeepers, journalists, aid workers and minorities in the Central African Republic". It called on the government of the Central African Republic to sever all ties with the Wagner Group.

Examples of crimes believed to have been committed by Wagner Group members in the Central African Republic include the Aïgbado massacre, killing of 12 unarmed men near Bossangoa on 21 July 2021, and beating and holding suspected rebels in inhuman conditions in an open hole at a national army base in Alindao between June and August 2021.

== Mali ==
In April 2022, Human Rights Watch (HRW) reported that Russian mercenaries, believed to be members of the Wagner Group, had committed atrocities against hundreds of civilians in Mali, alongside members of the Malian Armed Forces. According to the NGO, Armed Conflict Location and Event Data Project, as many as 456 civilians died in nine incidents involving Malian forces and Wagner fighters, between January and mid-April 2022. The largest single atrocity was committed by Russian and Malian forces in the Moura massacre, where around 300 civilian men were killed on 23 March 2022. On 23 June 2026, two Tuareg civilian men were killed by a patrol of the Malian army and their Russian auxiliaries from the Africa Corps unit, with the body of one of them being subsequently dismembered and arranged in the shape of a swastika.

== Legal proceedings ==
=== Regional ===
The Russian government denied accountability in its local courts. While thousands of investigations were undertaken, only one person was convicted for crimes against the Chechens in the Chechen wars—Yuri Budanov, convicted by a Russian court of kidnapping and murder of Elza Kungaeva and sentenced to 10 years in prison in 2003—which led Amnesty International to conclude that there is "no accountability" and that a Russian "lack of prosecution has resulted in a climate of impunity".

On 29 March 2005 Sergey Lapin was sentenced to 11 years for the torture of Chechen student Zelimkhan Murdalov in police custody, who disappeared since. In December 2007, Lt Yevgeny Khudyakov and Lt Sergei Arakcheyev were sentenced to 17 and 15 years for killing three Chechen construction workers near a Grozny checkpoint in January 2003.

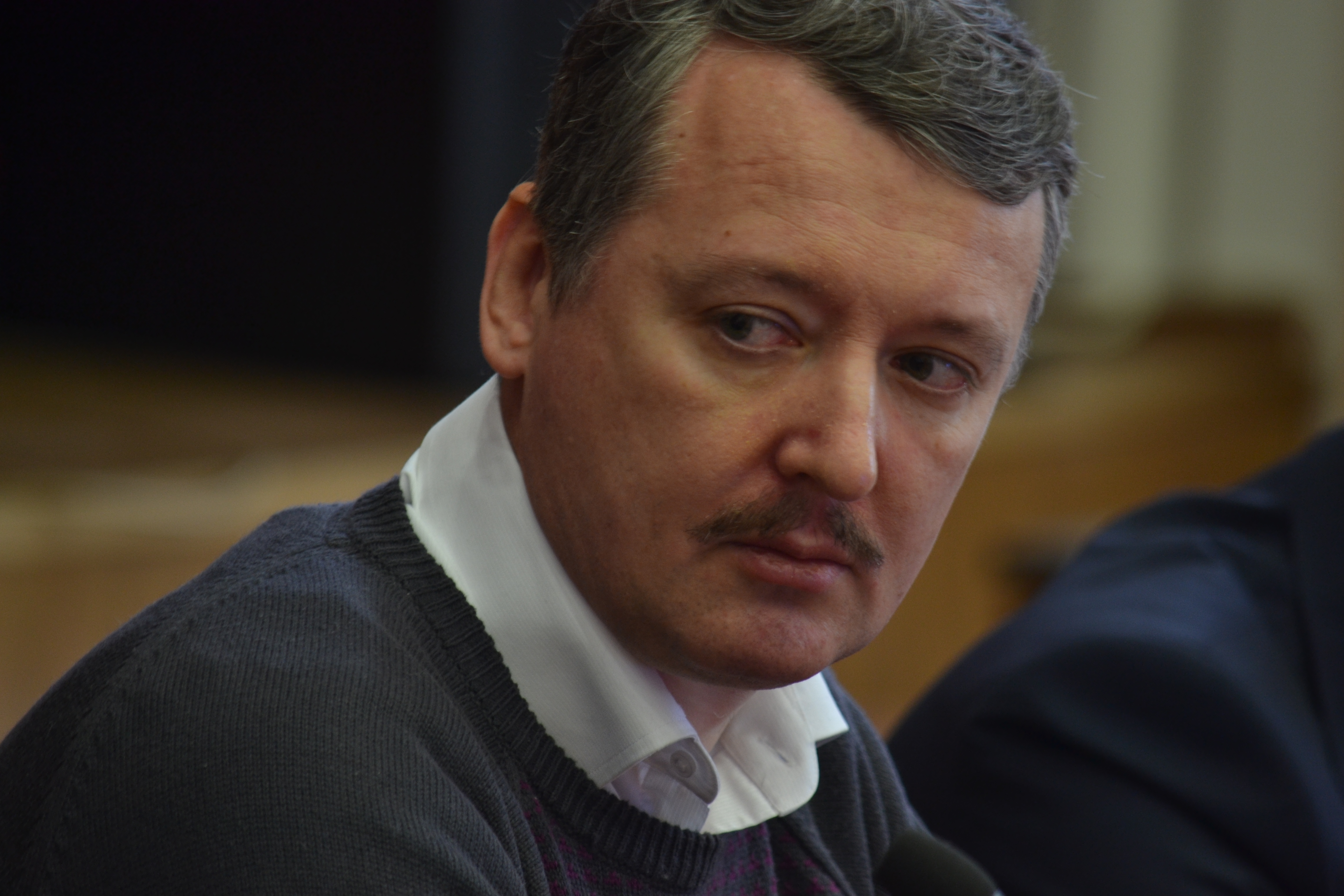
In 2022, former FSB employee Igor Strelkov was sentenced in absentia by a Dutch court to life in prison for shooting down MH17.

On 24 May 2018, after extensive comparative research, the Dutch investigation concluded that the Buk that shot down the 2014 Malaysia Airlines Flight 17 came from the Russian 53rd Anti-Aircraft Missile Brigade in Kursk. In a statement by the Dutch Minister of Foreign Affairs of 5 July 2017, it was announced that several countries will prosecute any suspects identified in the downing of flight MH17 in the Netherlands and under Dutch law. A future treaty between the Netherlands and Ukraine will make it possible for the Netherlands to prosecute in the cases of all 298 victims, regardless of their nationality. This treaty was signed on 7 July 2017. On 19 June 2019, Dutch prosecutors charged four people over the deaths in the MH17 crash: three Russians—Igor Strelkov, a former FSB employee; Sergey Dubinskiy and Oleg Pulatov; former GRU operatives—and one Ukrainian—Leonid Kharchenko—associated with the Donetsk People's Republic. On 17 November 2022, a Dutch court found Girkin, Dubinsky and Kharchenko guilty and sentenced them in absentia to life in prison.

On 29 August 2003, a Dutch court (Rechtbank 's-Gravenhage) found that the Samashki massacre of 250 Chechen civilians was a crime against humanity. On 9 November 2021, Ukraine authorities arrested Denis Kulikovsky, a senior warden of the Izoliatsiia detention center in the Donetsk People's Republic, where prisoners were tortured.

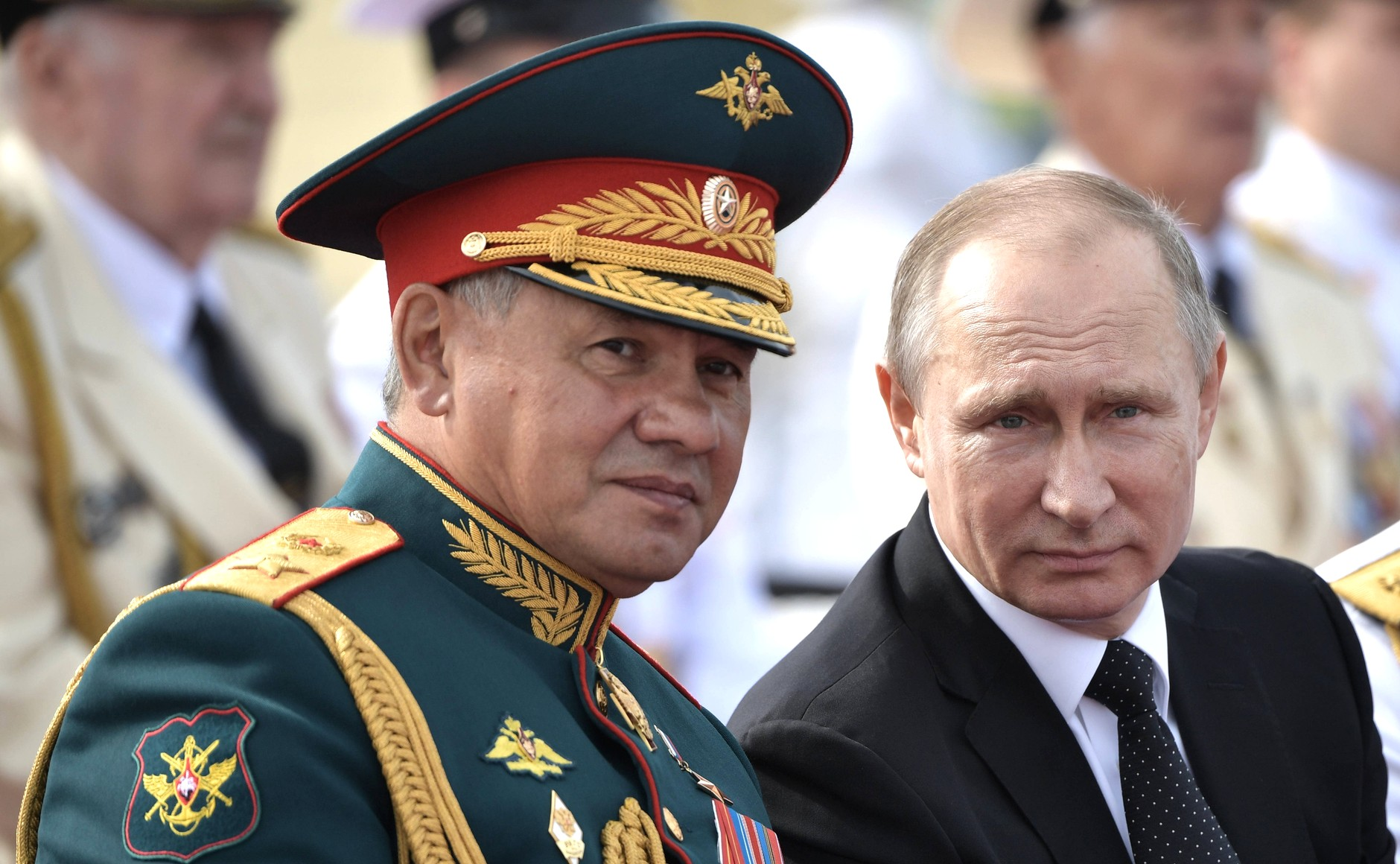
Russian President Vladimir Putin, who has effectively ruled Russia since 2000, and Russian Defense Minister Sergei Shoigu are both accused of war crimes.

On 15 March 2022, the United States Senate passed a resolution unanimously condemning war crimes committed by Russian forces in Ukraine and calling for investigations by the International Criminal Court, including against Vladimir Putin.

In 2022, national parliaments, including those of Poland, Ukraine, Canada, Estonia, Latvia, Lithuania, and Ireland, declared that a genocide was taking place in Ukraine.

On 13 May 2022, Ukrainian authorities started their first war crimes trial involving the 2022 Russian invasion of Ukraine, when Russian soldier Vadim Shishimarin was indicted for killing an unarmed civilian in the Sumy Oblast. He was sentenced to 15 years in prison. On 31 May, a Kyiv court sentenced two Russian soldiers to 11 1/2 years each for firing artillery on two villages in the Kharkiv Oblast. On 8 August 2022, Russian soldier Mikhailo Kulikov was sentenced to 10 years in prison for firing from his tank at an apartment building on the outskirts of Chernihiv. On 29 September 2022 Russian Lieutenant Serhiy Steiner was sentenced in absentia to 9 years in prison by a Ukrainian court for looting and destruction of civilian property in the village of Lukyanivka. On 23 December 2022, a Ukrainian court sentenced four Russian soldiers to 11 years in prison for abducting and torturing three residents of Borova who formed an Anti-Terrorist Unit. On 3 March 2023, a Ukrainian court sentenced a Russian pilot to 12 years in prison for dropping eight bombs on the Kharkiv TV and radio station. By December 2022, Ukraine identified more than 600 suspected war criminals from Russia, including Russian Defense Minister Sergei Shoigu.

Since 2022 Ukrainian government had been running a website Russian Torturers which is used to publish personal details and military affiliation of the perpetrators of war crimes in Ukraine.

=== International ===
The Russian government has tried to effectively block or prevent any kind of international prosecution of its role in suspected war crimes by an international court, using its seat at the United Nations Security Council to veto resolutions which call for an investigation and bringing accountability for the downing of the Malaysia Airlines Flight 17 over Donetsk Oblast and for crimes being committed in Syria. It denied that a chemical attack had taken place in Douma on 7 April 2018, but this was nonetheless confirmed in a report by the UN-backed Organisation for the Prohibition of Chemical Weapons.

On 7 April 2022, the United Nations General Assembly Resolution ES-11/3 suspended Russia from the UN Human Rights Council due to war crimes in Ukraine.

On 23 November 2022, the European Parliament designated Russia a state sponsor of terrorism, declaring that its widespread military attacks on Ukrainian energy infrastructure, hospitals, schools and shelters violate international law and endanger Ukrainian civilians in winter. On 19 January 2023, the European Parliament also adopted a resolution recommending the establishment of an international tribunal to prosecute Putin and Belarus' leader Alexander Lukashenko for war crimes.

In its 2024 report on the siege of Mariupol, Human Rights Watch published a list of 10 people who should be held responsible for war crimes due to their command responsibility:

- Vladimir Putin, president of the Russia and commander-in-chief of the military
- Sergei Shoigu, defense minister and military second-in-command
- Valery Gerasimov, first deputy defense minister and chief of the general staff of the armed forces
- Sergei Rudskoy, first deputy chief of the General Staff of the Armed Forces and head of the Main Operations Directorate of the General Staff of the Armed Forces
- Aleksandr Dvornikov, commander of the Southern Military District
- Viktor Zolotov, commander-in-chief of the Russian National Guard
- Andrey Mordvichev, commander of the 8th Combined Arms Army
- Ramzan Kadyrov, head of the Chechen Republic and Chechen national guard forces
- Adam Delimkhanov, commander of Chechen forces in Mariupol during the assault on the city
- Denis Pushilin, head of the Donetsk People's Republic (DNR) separatist puppet state

==== European Court of Human Rights ====
Due to impunity for Russian soldiers in Russia, hundreds of victims of abuse have filed applications with the European Court of Human Rights (ECtHR). By 2009, the ECtHR issued 115 verdicts (including in Baysayeva v. Russia) finding the Russian government guilty of enforced disappearances, extrajudicial executions, torture, and for failing to properly investigate these crimes in Chechnya.

On 21 January 2021, the ECtHR also separately found Russia guilty of murder, torture, looting, and destruction of homes in Georgia, as well as preventing the return of 20,000 displaced Georgians to their territory.

The Council of Europe, the international organization that administers the ECtHR, expelled Russia on 15 March 2022 following the invasion of Ukraine.

==== International Criminal Court ====
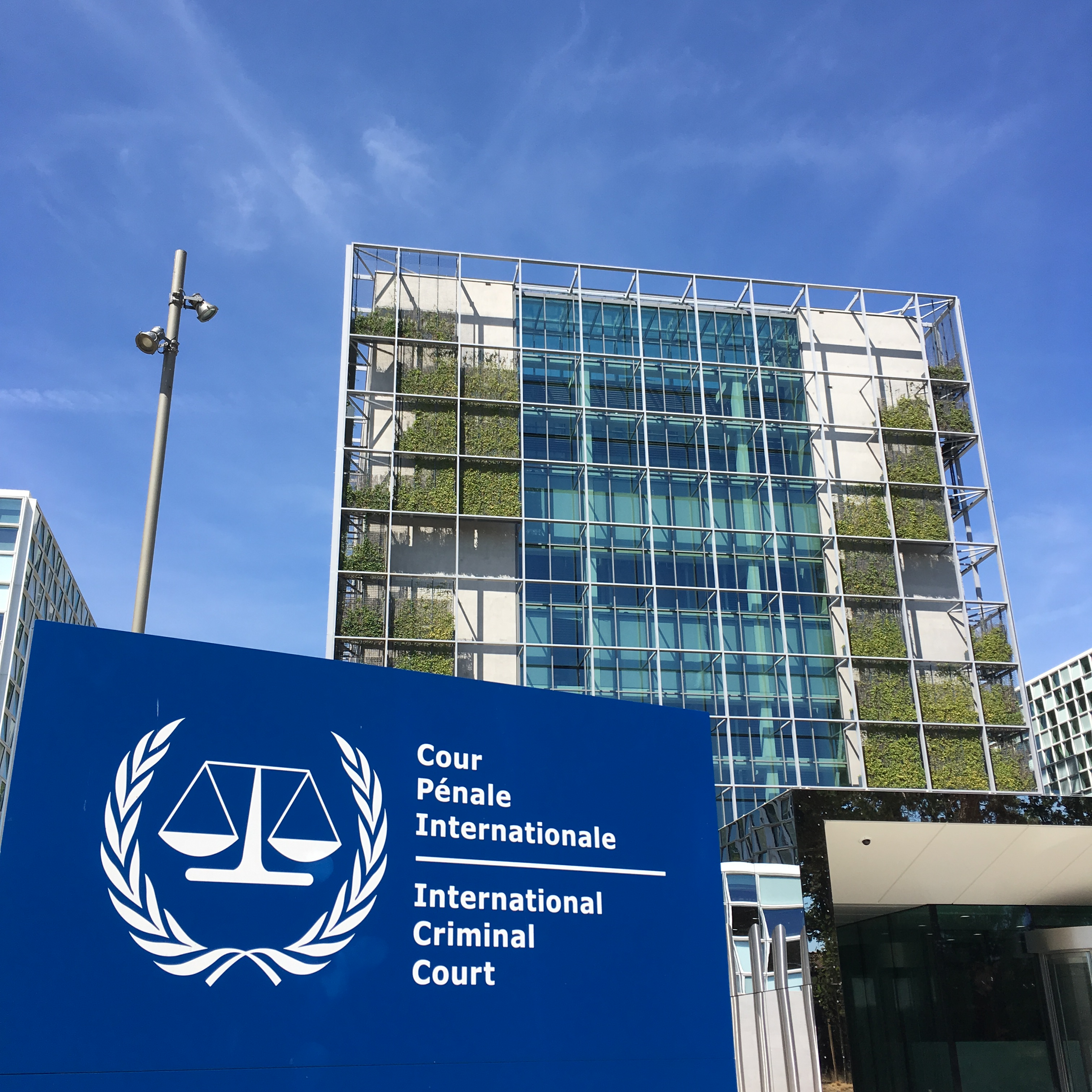
International Criminal Court building in The Hague

When the International Criminal Court (ICC) started to investigate Russia's annexation of Crimea for possible violations of international law, Russia withdrew its membership on 16 November 2016. Nonetheless, in its preliminary 2017 report, the ICC found that "the situation within the territory of Crimea and Sevastopol would amount to an international armed conflict between Ukraine and the Russian Federation" and that it "factually amounts to an ongoing state of occupation". It further found that there is credible evidence that at least 10 people have disappeared and are believed to have been killed in Crimea for opposing the change of its status. In January 2016, the ICC also opened an investigation into possible war crimes perpetrated during the 2008 Russo-Georgian War.

On 28 February 2022, the ICC prosecutor Karim Ahmad Khan announced that he would launch an investigation into alleged war crimes in Ukraine. On 17 March 2023, the ICC issued arrest warrants against Vladimir Putin and Russia's Commissioner for Children's Rights Maria Lvova-Belova for war crimes of deportation and illegal transfer of civilians (children) from occupied Ukraine to Russia. Human Rights Watch welcomed the indictment, saying it "advances justice". Amnesty International also lauded ICC's decision, recommending that the indictment should be expanded to include many other war crimes as well.

On 5 March 2024, the ICC indicted Lieutenant General Sergei Kobylash, Commander of Russian Aerospace Forces, and Admiral Viktor Sokolov, Commander of the Black Sea Fleet, for war crimes and crimes against humanity perpetrated through attacks at civilian objects, causing excessive incidental harm to civilians or damage to civilian objects, and inhumane acts during the attacks against Ukrainian electric infrastructure from October 2022 through March 2023. On 25 June 2024, the ICC indicted former Minister of Defence Sergei Shoigu and Head of General Staff of the Armed Forces of the Russian Federation Valery Gerasimov for the same three counts.

US President Joe Biden allowed the US to cooperate with the ICC in sharing evidence of Russian war crimes.

==== International Court of Justice ====
Ukraine brought a case before the International Court of Justice (ICJ) against Russia. On 16 March 2022, a ruling was reached, and the ICJ ordered Russia to "immediately suspend the military operations" in Ukraine.

==== International Commission of Inquiry on Ukraine ====
On 4 March 2022, the United Nations Human Rights Council voted 32 in favour versus 2 against and 13 absentions to create the International Commission of Inquiry on Ukraine, an independent international committee of three human rights experts with a mandate to investigate violations of human rights and of international humanitarian law in the context of the 2022 Russian invasion of Ukraine.

== In documentaries ==
- An investigation by Alexei Navalny's team dedicated to one of the most notorious war criminals, Alexander Borodai, who belongs to the Donetsk People's Republic and is guilty of shooting down the Malaysia Boeing (2021).
- Anathomy of Ruscism (Ukrainian. Анатомія рашизму, 2023).

== See also ==
- German war crimes
- Israeli war crimes
- Italian war crimes
- Japanese war crimes
- List of war crimes
- List of massacres in Russia
- List of massacres in the Soviet Union
- Soviet war crimes
- Turkish war crimes
- United States war crimes
