= Alkhan-Yurt massacre =

1999 massacre of Chechen civilians by the Russian Ground Forces

Coordinates: 43.228°N 45.568°E

- Location: Alkhan-Yurt, Chechnya
- Date: 1-18 December 1999
- Target: Chechen civilians
- Attack type: Looting, murder, rape
- Deaths: At least 17 to 41
- Perpetrator: Russian Ground Forces under Gen. Vladimir Shamanov

The Alkhan-Yurt massacre was the December 1999 incident in the village of Alkhan-Yurt near the Chechen capital Grozny involving Russian troops under command of General Vladimir Shamanov. The villagers claimed that approximately 41 civilians were killed in the spree, while human rights groups confirmed and documented 17 incidents of murder and three incidents of rape.

According to Human Rights Watch (HRW), it was not an isolated incident, as Russian troops had been systematically looting villages and towns under their control.

== Events ==
Russian forces took control of Alkhan-Yurt, a village just south of Grozny on December 1, 1999, after weeks of heavy fighting. The Chechen fighters, who included many foreign fighters among their ranks, were reportedly led by Akhmed Zakayev.

Because of their experience of the First Chechen War, the people in Alkhan-Yurt were able to take precautions which limited civilian casualties during the heavy bombardment. Nearly all of the killings committed by Russian troops in Alkhan-Yurt after they seized the village were reportedly carried out by soldiers who were looting.

The soldiers summarily executed many who had resisted them, and numerous other villagers received death threats or narrowly escaped execution. According to the 2000 HRW report:

(Russian soldiers) first expelled, temporarily, hundreds of civilians from Alkhan-Yurt, and then began systematically looting and burning the village, killing anyone in their way. Among the dead were: centenarian Nabitst Kornukayeva, and her elderly son Arbi, who were found shot to death in the yard of their looted home; fifty-seven-year-old Khamid Khazuyev, who was shot in the yard of his home when he tried to stop looting soldiers; Akhanpash Dudayev, sixty-five, who was killed in his basement, and his body burned in his looted home; and Taus Sultanov, forty-nine, who was shot in a cellar and left to bleed to death while soldiers robbed other civilians with him of their belongings. The killings went on for more than two weeks, without any apparent attempt by Russian authorities to stop it. Aindi Altimirov, the last to die, was killed and beheaded by Russian soldiers on December 18. (...) The looting of Alkhan-Yurt was systematic and organized, involving a large number of soldiers who acted with impunity throughout their stay in the village. Looted goods were stored in the homes occupied by Russian commanders as well as the tents of soldiers, and were transported openly in military vehicles out of Alkhan-Yurt. It is simply impossible that such widespread looting could take place in broad daylight without the knowledge and, at a minimum, the tacit consent of Russian commanders. The looting that took place in Alkhan-Yurt was not an isolated incident of such misconduct by Russian forces in Chechnya: since the beginning of the Chechen conflict, Russian troops have been systematically looting villages and towns under their control, and there is no evidence that the Russian command has taken any steps to prevent it.

== Aftermath ==
Initially, the Russian Defence Ministry denied that anything happened in the village of Alkhan-Yurt. However, when Russia's deputy prime minister Nikolai Koshman and a committee of Russian generals inspected the village, the officials discovered several caches of goods looted by Russian soldiers, including some splattered with blood. In addition, one drunken soldier reportedly even threatened to "shoot" Koshman. The officials promised an investigation, which was soon closed by the military "for lack of evidence of a crime."

The villagers and Malik Saidullayev, one of the most prominent of pro-Moscow Chechen leaders, identified the soldiers responsible for the abuses as the unit under the command of Major-General Vladimir Shamanov. Despite his role in presiding over the abuses in Alkhan-Yurt, Shamanov received Russia's highest honor, the Hero of Russia medal, on December 28, 1999, from the hands of then Russian president Boris Yeltsin who described the army's conduct in Chechnya as "faultless."

== See also ==
- Novye Aldi massacre
- Samashki massacre
- Staropromyslovski massacre
