= Staropromyslovsky massacre =

1999 mass killing of civilians by Russian troops during the Second Chechen War

- Location: Grozny, Chechen Republic, Russia
- Date: December 1999-January 2000
- Target: Staropromyslovsky City District
- Attack type: Summary executions
- Deaths: 38 to 56
- Perpetrator: Russian federal forces
- Motive: None

The Staropromyslovsky massacre occurred between December 1999 and January 2000 when at least 38 confirmed civilians were summarily executed by Russian federal soldiers during an apparent spree in Staropromyslovsky City District of Grozny, the capital of the Chechen Republic, according to survivors and eyewitnesses. The killings went unpunished and publicly unacknowledged by the Russian authorities. In 2007, one case of a triple murder was ruled against Russia in the European Court of Human Rights (ECHR).

== The murders ==
The killings occurred between late December 1999 and mid-January 2000, during the heavy fighting for the city. Most of the 38 victims were women and elderly men, and all appear to have been deliberately shot by Russian soldiers at close range. More than a dozen additional civilians may also have been murdered in the district; in addition, six men from Staropromyslovsky City District who were last seen in Russian custody "disappeared" during this same period and remain unaccounted for.

== Aftermath ==
Russian military and civilian authorities are not known to have seriously investigated the Staropromyslovsky killings, as well as other similar incidents in Chechnya.

On November 29, 2007 the ECHR has made a decision on the case of Tangieva v. Russia in favor of a relative of victims of one of the summary executions in the district that took place in the early hours of January 11, 2000. The victims, parents of the applicant, were both shot dead alongside another woman in their home, which was then set alight. Their deaths were attributed to the Russian Federation; the Court also blamed Russia for the failure to provide an effective investigation.

== See also ==
- Alkhan-Yurt massacre
- Novye Aldi massacre
- Samashki massacre
- List of massacres in Russia
