= Self-defense force =

Self-defense force may refer to:

- Militia, an army or some other fighting organization of non-professional and/or part-time soldiers
- Japan Self-Defense Forces, the unified military forces of Japan, established in 1954
  - Japan Maritime Self-Defense Force
  - Japan Ground Self-Defense Force
  - Japan Air Self-Defense Force
- Self-Defense Forces (NES regions), a multi-ethnic territorial defense militia in North and East Syria
- People's Self-Defense Force, a South Vietnamese militia during the Vietnam War

== See also ==
- Military, or armed forces, a heavily armed, highly organized force primarily intended for warfare
- Ministry of defence
- Zombie Self-Defense Force, a 2006 Japanese comedy film
