= Sơn Trà massacre =

Vietnam War atrocity

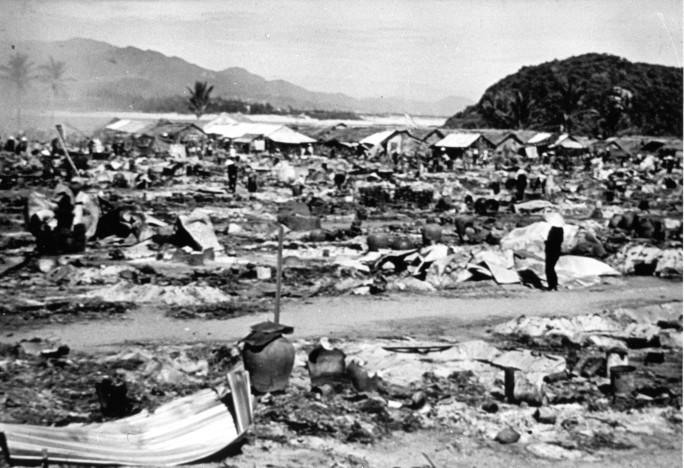
- Sơn Trà after the attack
- Location: 15.386°N 108.778°E; Sơn Trà, Bình Sơn district, Quảng Ngãi province, South Vietnam
- Date: 28 June 1968
- Attack type: Massacre
- Deaths: 88
- Injuries: 103
- Perpetrator: Viet Cong

The Sơn Trà Massacre was a massacre of South Vietnamese civilians committed by the Viet Cong (VC) during the Vietnam War, in Sơn Trà village, Bình Sơn district, Quảng Ngãi province, South Vietnam on 28 June 1968.

== Background ==
Sơn Trà was a fishing village located approximately 5 miles (8.0 km) southeast of Chu Lai Base Area. It had a population of approximately 4,000 people, including many resettled refugees. The village was defended by 14 United States Marines of a Combined Action Platoon (CAP) and 30 Popular Force troops and there were also about 35 Civil Operations and Revolutionary Development Support (CORDS) workers and a small group of People's Self-Defense Forces. The villagers had previously refused to provide aid and recruits to the VC who had threatened to burn the village down.

== Attack and massacre ==
The attack began at 23:10 on 28 June 1968 with a mortar attack. Many of the civilians took shelter in their defensive bunkers and then between 75 and 300 VC moved through the village throwing satchel charges into bunkers killing their occupants and starting fires. Other villagers fled toward the CAP position, blocking the forces there from engaging the attackers. Soldiers from the 198th Light Infantry Brigade were landed at the CAP position by helicopters approximately 30 minutes after the attack began but they waited until dawn to move into the village.

== Aftermath ==
73 civilians and 15 CORDS workers were killed in the attack and a further 103 civilians were wounded. 570 homes were destroyed in the attack and the resulting fires leaving almost 2,800 people homeless. The defenders claim to have killed 4 VC.

== See also ==
- Viet Cong and People's Army of Vietnam use of terror in the Vietnam War
