= Thạnh Mỹ massacre =

1970 Vietnam War killing of civilians

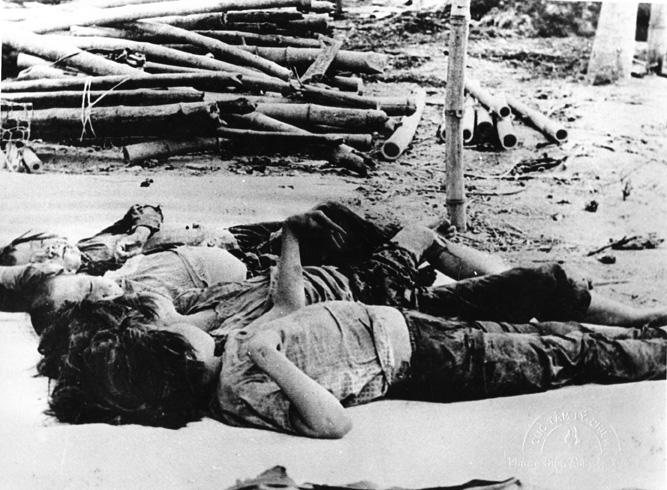
- Victims of the attack

- Thạnh Mỹ (Vietnam) Location of Thạnh Mỹ in Vietnam
- Location: 15.818°N 108.296°E; Thạnh Mỹ village, Quảng Nam province, South Vietnam
- Date: 11 June 1970
- Attack type: Massacre, grenade attack, mortar bombardment
- Deaths: 74 unarmed civilians and four attackers
- Injuries: 160+
- Perpetrator: Viet Cong
- Defenders: US Marines and South Vietnamese militias

The Thạnh Mỹ Massacre was a massacre of South Vietnamese civilians committed by the Viet Cong (VC) during the Vietnam War, in Thạnh Mỹ hamlet, Phú Thạnh commune, (now Bà Rén village, Quế Xuân 1 commune) Quế Sơn District, Quảng Nam Province, South Vietnam on 11 June 1970. The hamlet, which was pro-government and defended by US Marines and South Vietnamese militia, was attacked by the VC in the early morning of 11 June. Under cover of a mortar barrage VC sappers set fire to houses and killed civilians either by shooting or throwing explosives into their shelters. The Marines and South Vietnamese forces engaged with the VC and called in artillery support. By 03:15 the VC began to withdraw and the Marines reoccupied the village and began evacuating the wounded.

In all 156 houses were destroyed and 35 damaged during the attack. Four militiamen were killed and two wounded, ten U.S. Marines were wounded. Civilian casualties were 74 dead, many of them women and children; 60 severely injured; and over 100 lightly wounded. Four VC dead were found, one prisoner was taken and one of the VC defected. The VC later claimed that they had been attempting to capture the bridge in the village and that the civilians had merely been caught in the crossfire.

== Background ==
Phu Thanh village, a complex of several hamlets, straddled Highway 1 about 3 miles (4.8 km) north of Landing Zone Baldy. Just to the north of the village, the Highway crossed the Ba Ren Bridge, one of the vital links on the land lines of communication between LZ Baldy and Da Nang. Phu Thanh was a pro South Vietnamese government village and contained the homes of many Regional Force (RF) and Popular Force (PF) soldiers and government officials, and its people were a reliable source of information about the VC in their area. Because of its proximity to the bridge, Phu Thanh had strong security forces in and around it. CUPP Team 9, a squad from the 1st Platoon of Company A, 7th Marines, was stationed in the village with PF Platoons 144 and 171. Phu Thanh also contained a 22-man Revolutionary Development team and a People's Self-Defense Force unit of 31 members, eight of whom had weapons. Near the south end of the bridge lay the compound of the 323rd RF Company, which had as its main mission protection of the span. The command post of the 1st Platoon of Company A, which controlled several CUPPs along the highway north of LZ Baldy, was located near the RF compound.

For several weeks, rumors had circulated in the village that the VC were planning to attack the Ba Ren Bridge, but neither Marines nor Vietnamese saw any reason to expect an assault on the hamlets themselves. On the night of 10–11 June, the CUPP unit had taken up a night position within the village. The RF troops, following their usual practice, remained in their fortified compound watching the bridge.

== Attack and massacre ==
At 02:00 on 11 June, the VC, later identified as elements of the V-25th Main Force Battalion and the T-89th Sapper Battalion, launched a coordinated attack. It began with a barrage of 60mm and 82mm mortar fire. The mortars, located north and south of Phu Thanh, dropped a total of 200-250 high explosive and white phosphorus rounds on the village. They concentrated on CUPP 9, the bridge, the 1st Platoon CP and the RF compound. Simultaneous with this barrage, the VC attacked two other CUPP teams in hamlets south of Phu Thanh on Highway 1, engaging them with small arms, rocket-propelled grenades, grenades, and mortars and preventing them from maneuvering to reinforce Phu Thanh.

Under cover of the mortar fire, two groups of sappers entered the village, one from the east and one from the west. Armed with grenades and satchel charges, a few rushed the RF compound and the 1st Platoon command post and were cut down by the defenders' fire. Most began burning houses and hurling their grenades and satchel charges into family bomb shelters filled with civilians who had fled to them for protection from the shelling. A Marine recalled: "The enemy ran through the village, ordering people out of their bunkers. When they did [come out], they were shot, or else [the enemy threw] chicoms [grenades] into the bunker, killing the men, women, and children in them… Very many civilians [were] killed just inside their bunkers, if it wasn't from shrapnel wounds it was from fire where they were burned to death from the satchel charges used."

The defenders fought back as best they could, but the continuous mortar barrage prevented them from counterattacking to save the village. At the bridge, the RF company beat back a minor probe of its compound. CUPP 9 had 10 Marines wounded in the initial shelling, nevertheless, the Marines and PFs managed to form a perimeter in the blazing village and hold their position. When it became evident that the enemy were concentrating their attack on the civilians and bypassing the CUPP, the PF commander let most of his men go home to try to protect their families, but he himself stayed with the Marines, as did the PF radioman and mortar team.

At the 1st Platoon command post, Marines and PFs repelled a rush by a few of the sappers and answered the mortar barrage with their own 81mm and 60mm mortars. The platoon commander kept the 7th Marines Headquarters informed by radio of the progress of the battle and called for artillery and air support. The first rounds of friendly artillery began falling on suspected VC positions 20 minutes after the attack started.

At about 03:15, the VC mortar fire temporarily slackened as the sappers began to withdraw from the village. The Marines took advantage of the lull to send a squad into Phu Thanh to find and assist CUPP 9. To reach the CUPP, the squad had to work its way through a part of the village already devastated by the sappers. The squad reached the CUPP team and in two trips brought the wounded Marines and PFs to the bridge to be picked up by helicopters. Then, accompanied by the platoon's Vietnamese interpreter, the squad returned to the burning hamlets and began urging the people to bring their wounded to the bridge. By this time, the VC mortars had resumed firing slowly to cover the retreat of the sappers.

The first medical evacuation helicopter from Marine Aircraft Group 16 landed on the bridge around 03:30 and lifted out all the Marine, PF and RF wounded in the attack. Thereafter, a steady stream of helicopters came in, covered by two Cobra gunships, to evacuate the civilian wounded. The mortar bombardment ended at about 04:00 and by daylight all the severely wounded civilians had been evacuated and a team of doctors and corpsmen from LZ Baldy had reached Phu Thanh and had begun treating the minor casualties, over 100 in all.

== Aftermath ==
The 7th Marines commander arrived at 08:10 to assess the damage, followed at 10:20 by 1st Marine Division commander Major General Charles F. Widdecke. Within hours, the 1st Marine Division and the province government had emergency relief and reconstruction under way.

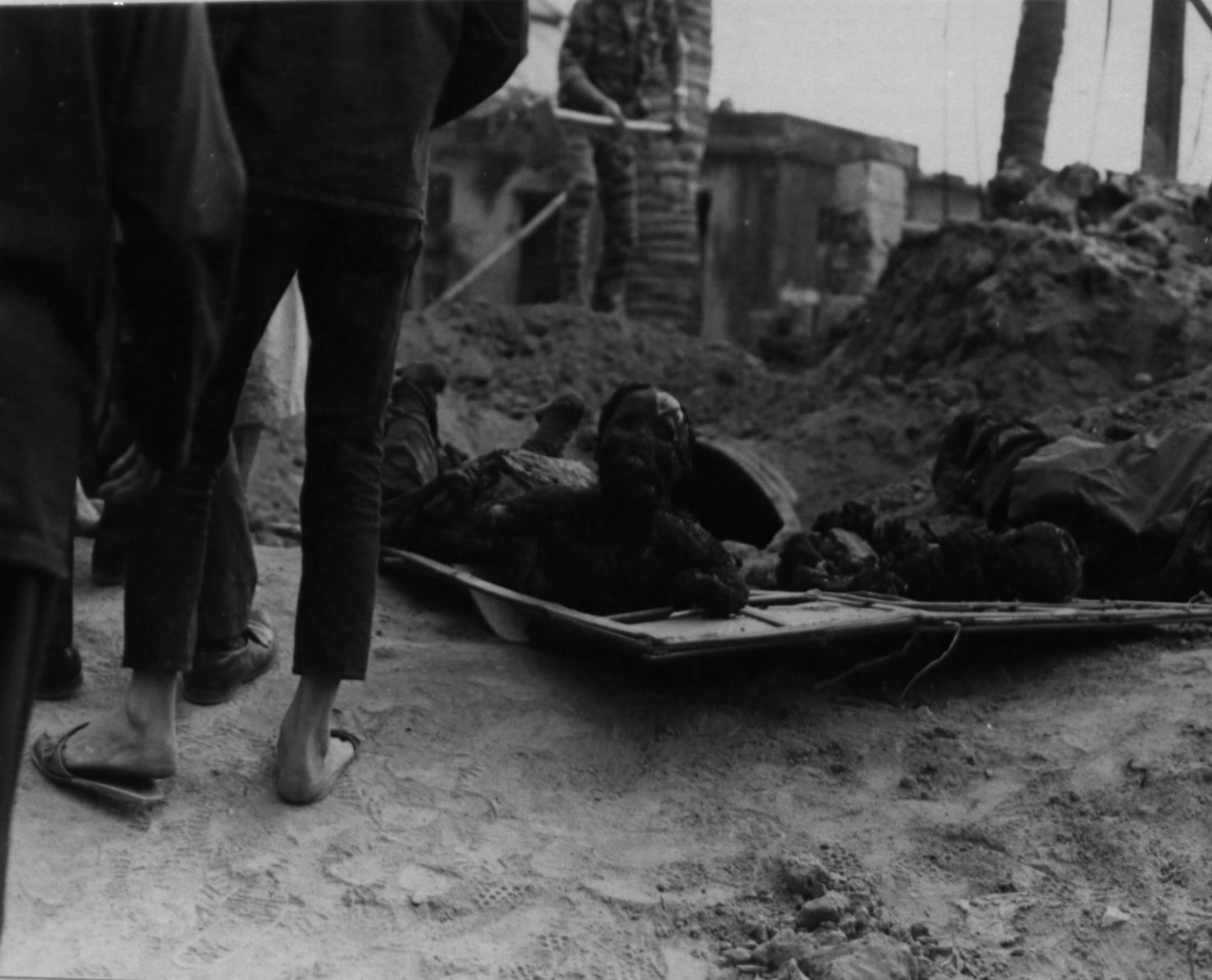
Vietnamese casualties of the massacre

The VC had destroyed 156 houses and damaged 35 more, most of them in Thanh My, the hardest hit of the village's hamlets. The attack had cost the Marines ten wounded, one of whom later died. Four RF and two PF soldiers had been wounded. Civilian casualties totalled 74 dead, many of them women and children; 60 severely injured; and over 100 lightly wounded. After the fight, the defenders found four dead VC in the wire around the RF compound and the 1st Platoon command post and they captured one prisoner and one Chieu Hoi.

Soon after the attack, the VC began spreading the report that their objective really had been the Ba Ren Bridge and that Phu Thanh and its people merely had been caught in the crossfire. The Marines countered that the VC had deliberately attacked the village. A Marine Lieutenant stated: "There was no military objective involved in this attack. I say this because first of all there was only light enemy contact directly at the compound. The mortars were fired in such a manner as to restrain any military contact . The VC stayed pretty much out of the area CUPP 9 was operating in. Also, the Ba Ren Bridge, which is a major line of communications on Route 1 was not hit; there was not even an attempt to blow this bridge up."

On 15 June the South Vietnamese Government issued a note to the International Control and Supervision Commission protesting the massacre and asking it to undertake an investigation.

William Broyles has written that the communists' massacre of civilians at Huế and Thanh My is inconvenient and so have been "airbrushed" out of Vietnamese history.

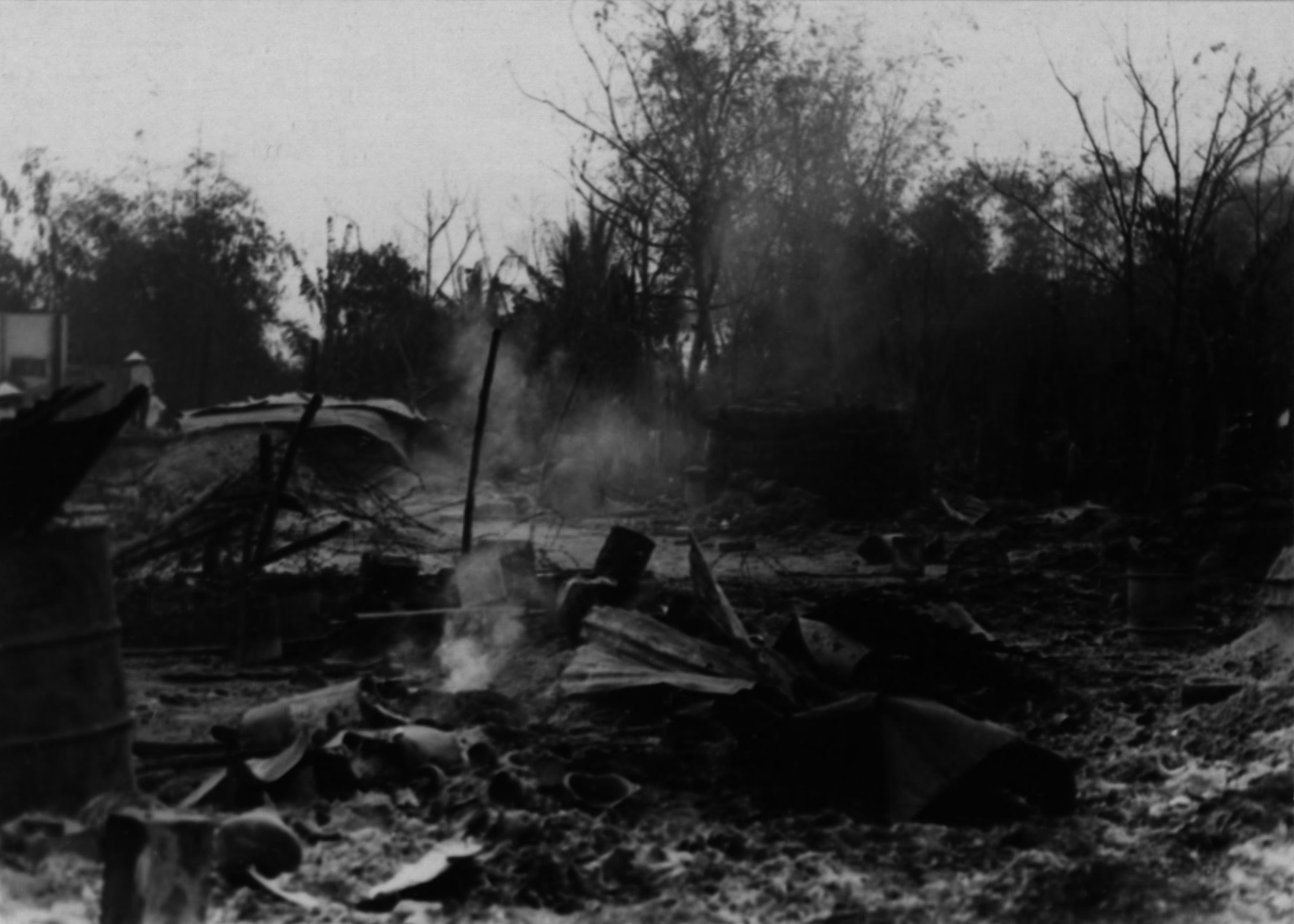
US Marine Corps photograph of the destroyed village

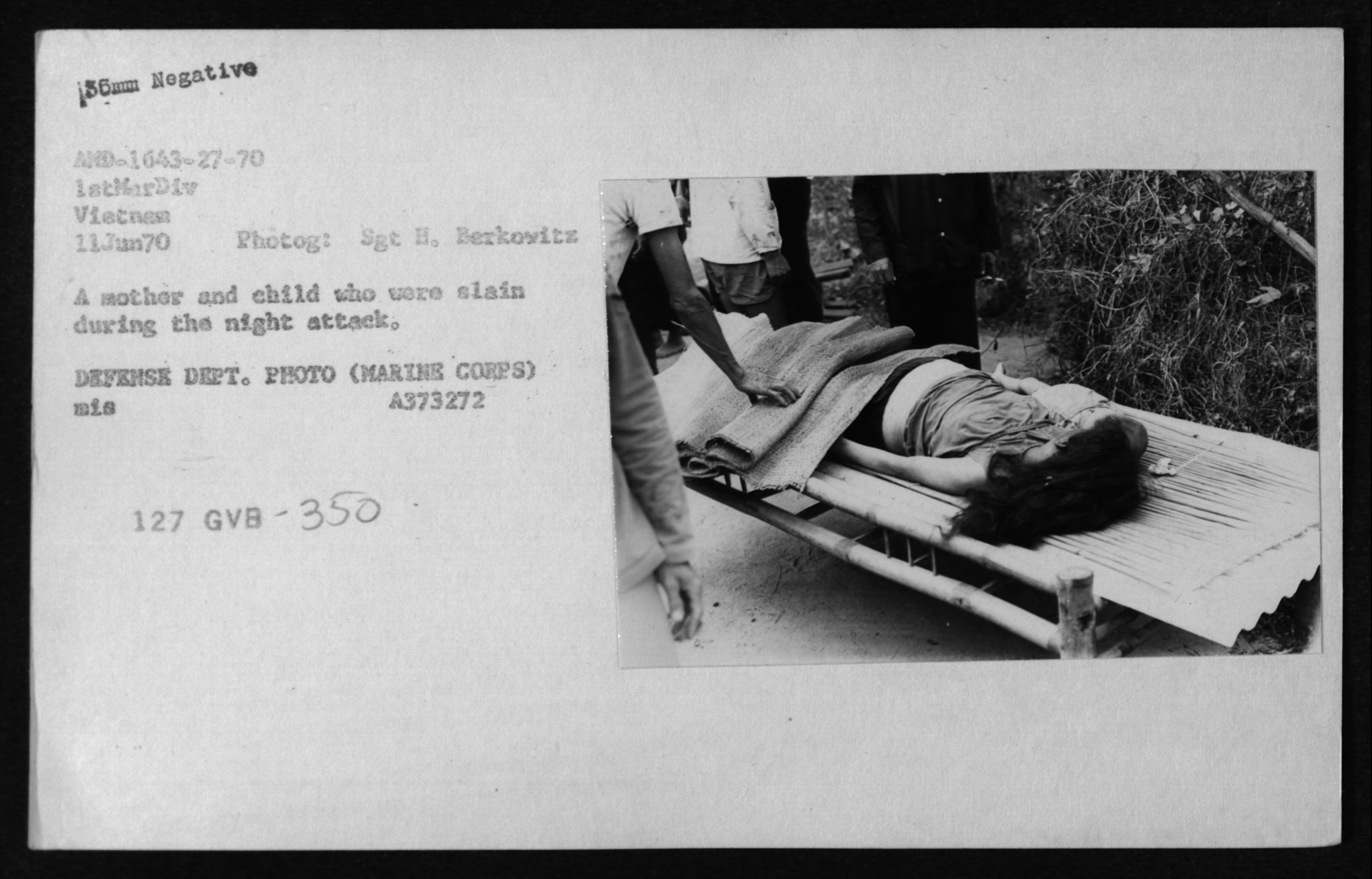
A photo report after the massacre

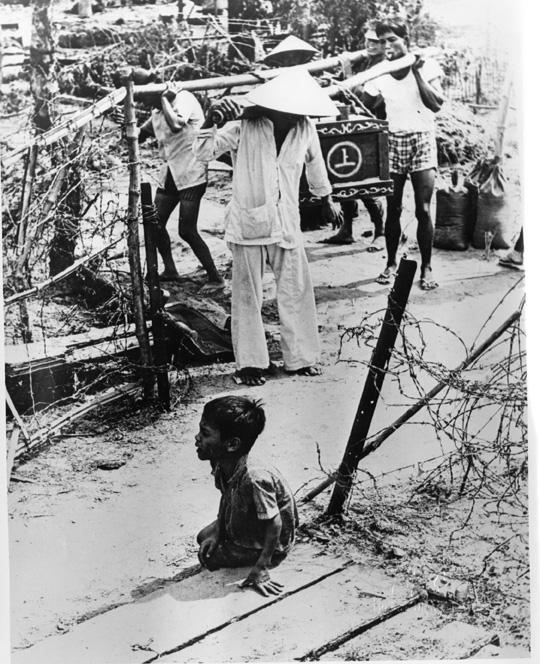

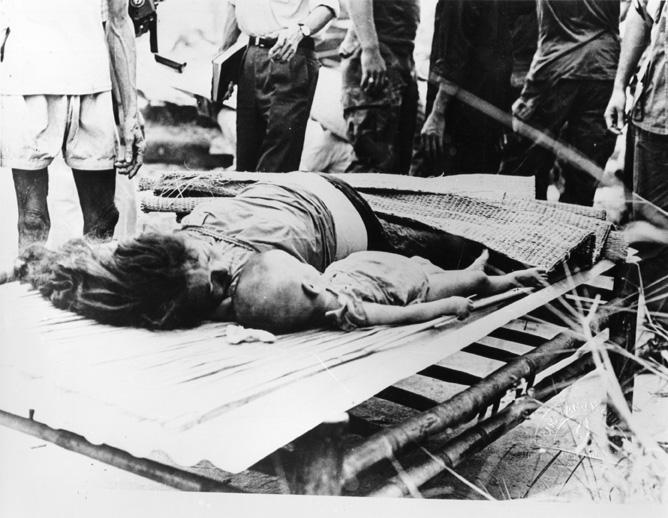
Victims of the massacre

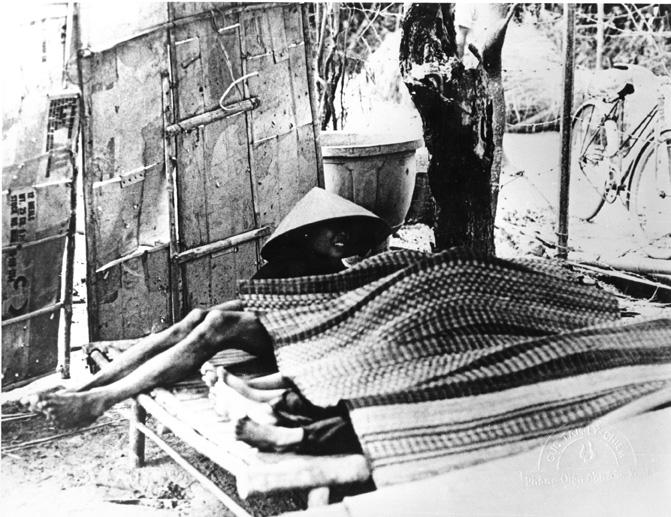

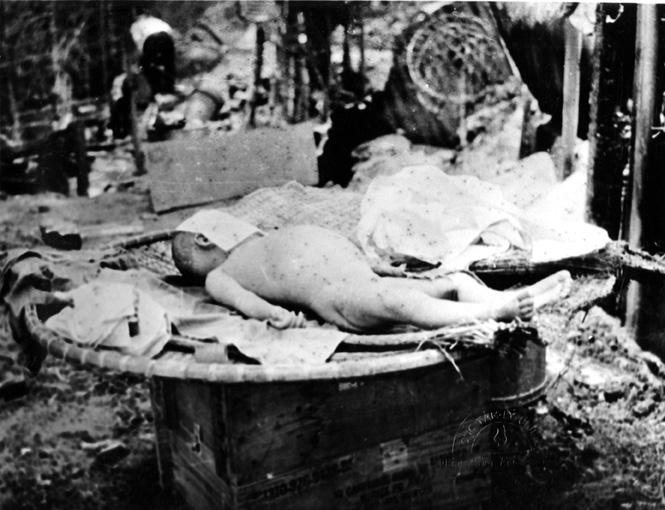

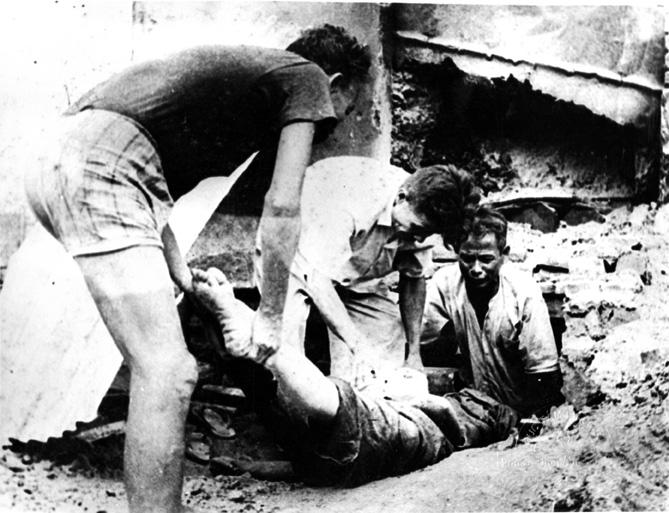

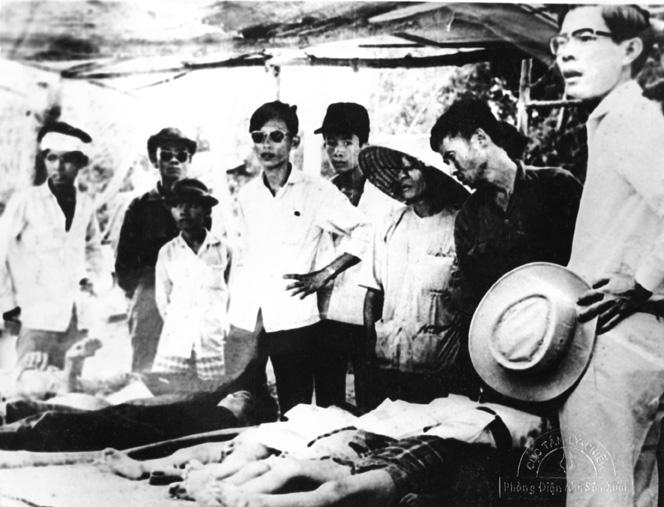

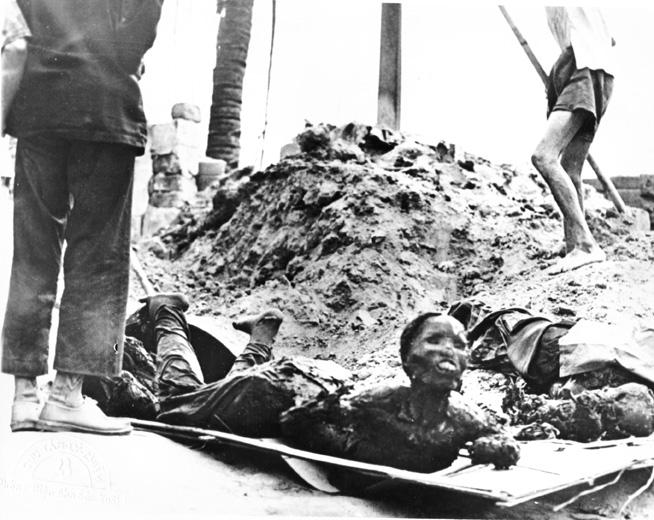

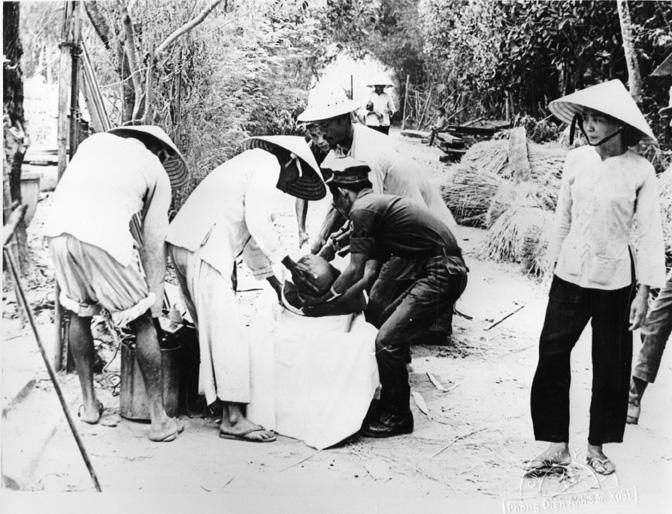

== See also ==
- List of massacres in Vietnam
- War crimes
