= 1965 Saigon bombing =

Bombing by Viet Cong

- Part of the Communist terrorism in Vietnam
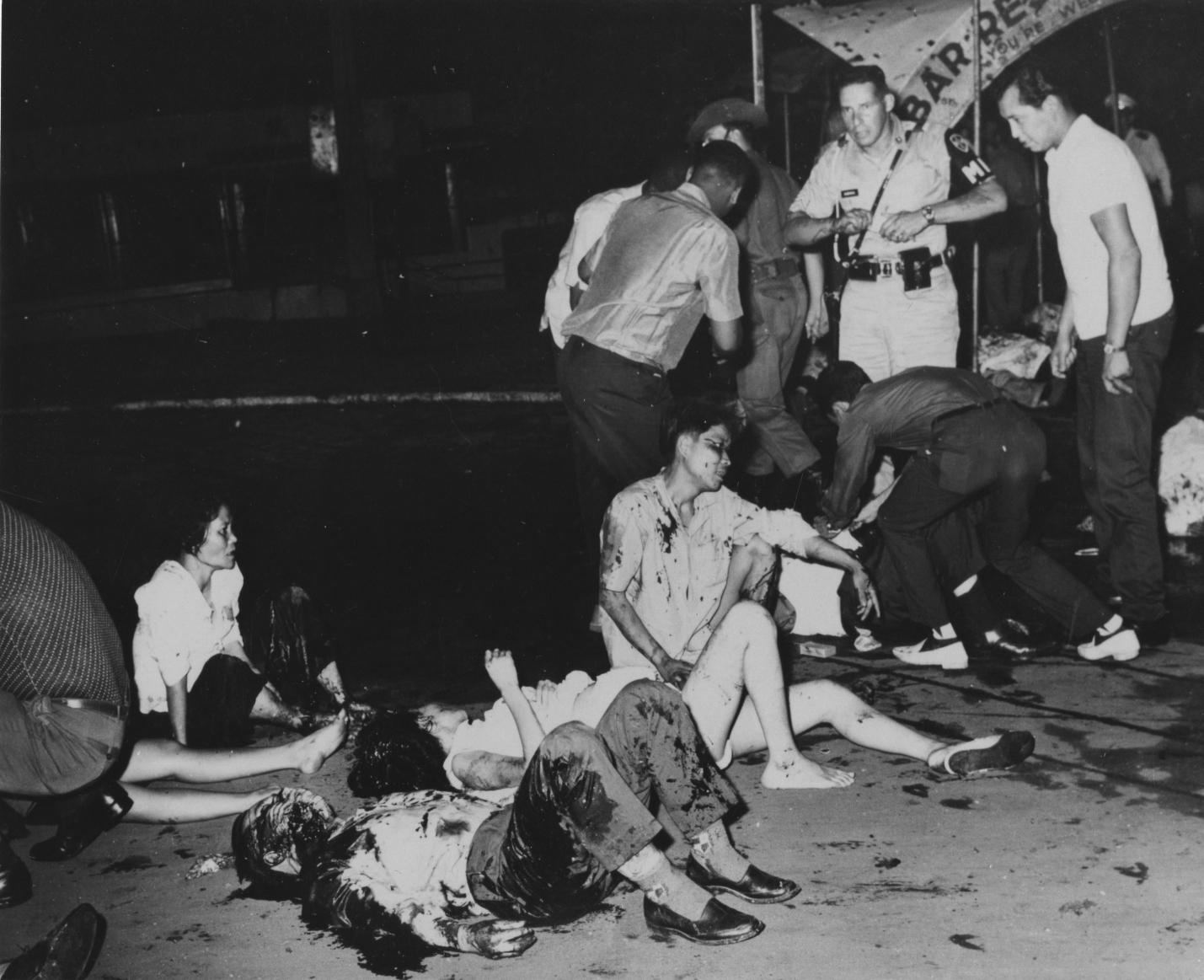
- Victims of the bombing
- Location: 10°49′32.36″N 106°43′52.6″E; Saigon River, Saigon, South Vietnam
- Date: 25 June 1965; 8:15 p.m. (UTC+7)
- Attack type: Time bomb
- Deaths: 31
- Injuries: 80
- Perpetrator: Viet Cong

On 25 June 1965, during the Vietnam War, the Viet Cong exploded two bombs at the Mỹ Cảnh restaurant in Saigon killing 31 people.

== Bombing ==
The first bomb detonated at 8:15 p.m. (local time) at the Mỹ Cảnh floating restaurant on Bạch Đằng Quay on the bank of the Saigon River. Moments after the first blast, another bomb exploded on the riverbank as the survivors fled the restaurant.

31 people were killed and 42 were wounded. Eight American servicemen were killed in the blast and a further 12 injured.

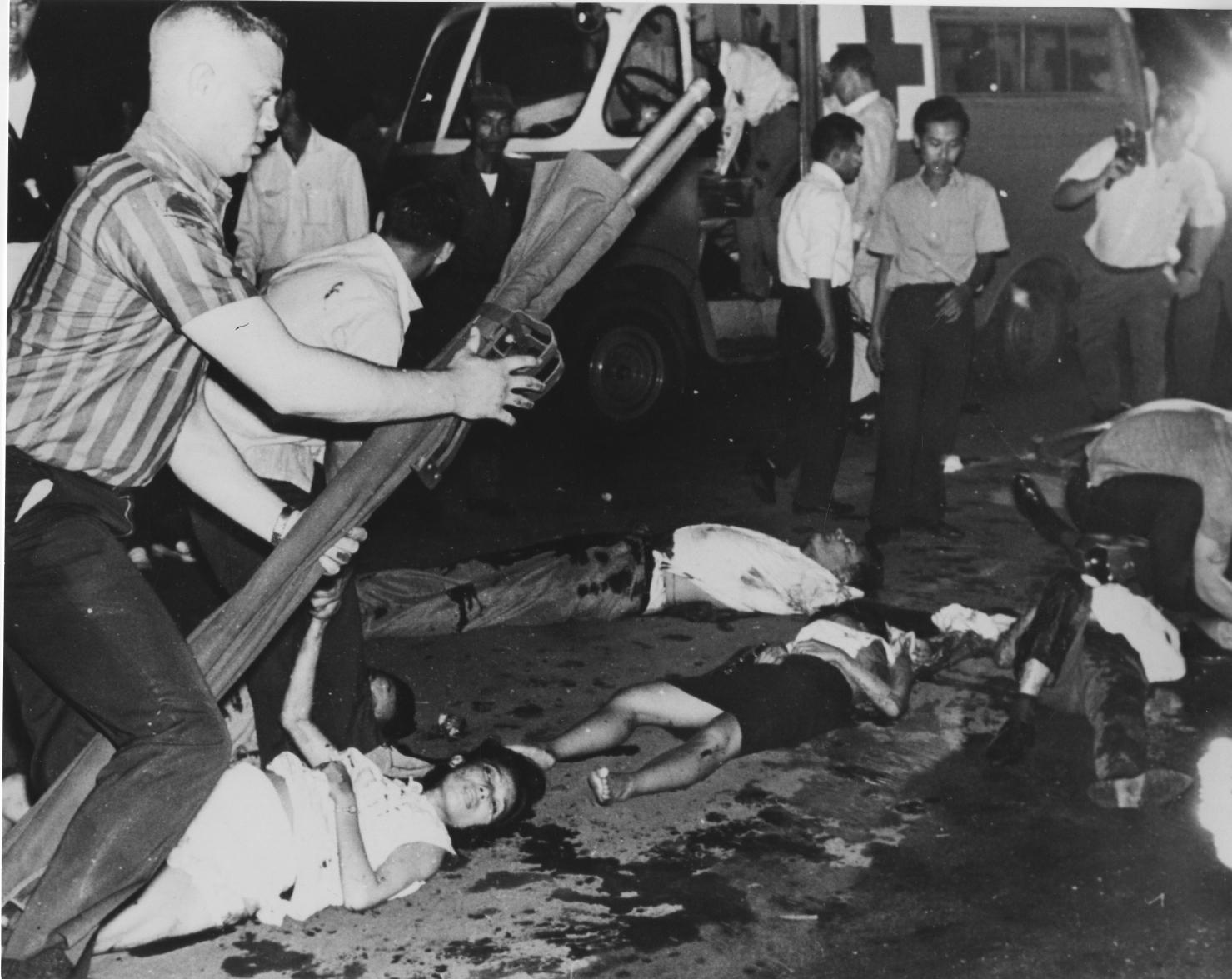

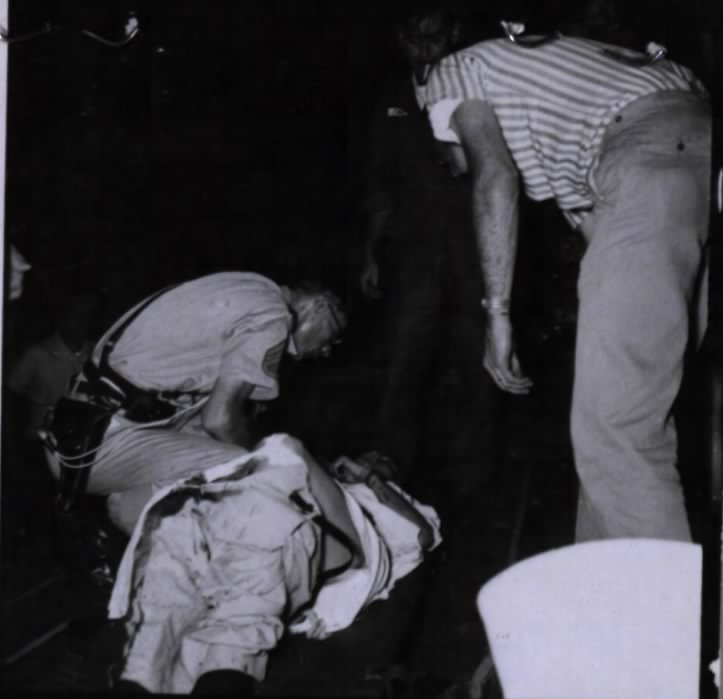

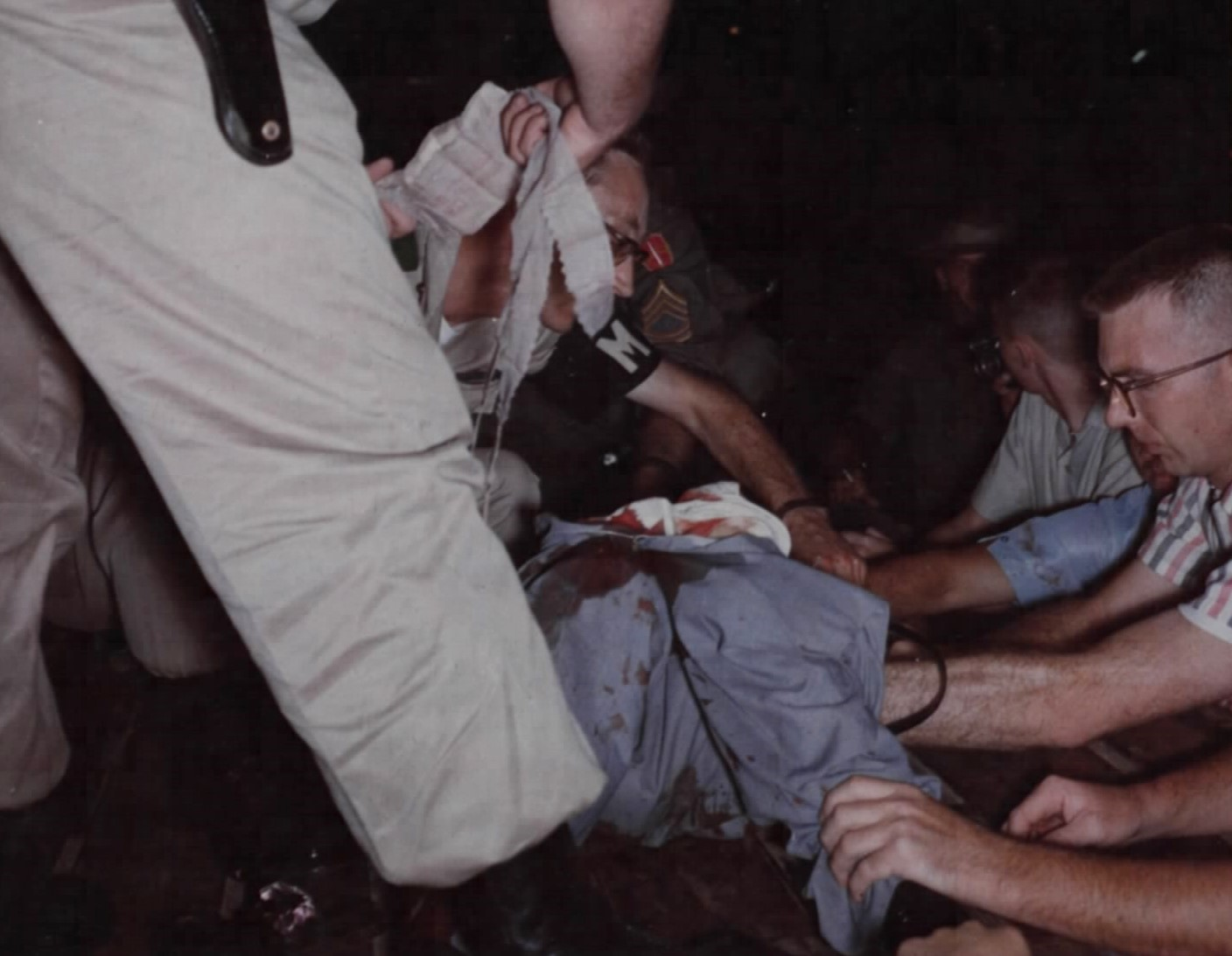
