= Đắk Sơn massacre =

Massacre committed by the Viet Cong during the Vietnam War in the village of Đắk Sơn

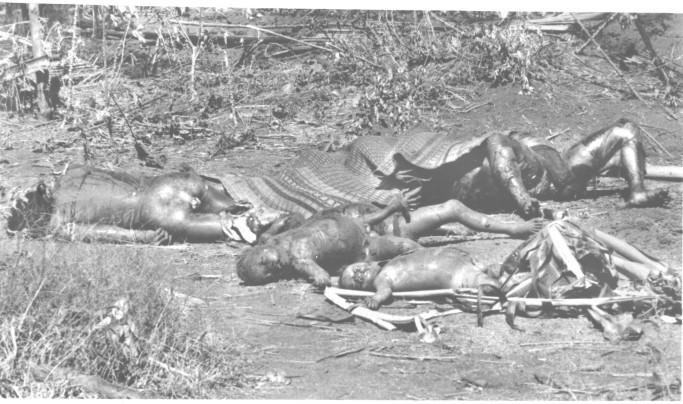
- Location: Đắk Sơn village, Phước Long, South Vietnam
- Date: 5 December 1967
- Target: Montagnard villagers of Đắk Sơn
- Attack type: Massacre
- Deaths: 252 civilians
- Perpetrator: Viet Cong

The Đắk Sơn Massacre was the massacre of Montagnard villagers perpetrated by the Viet Cong on 5 December 1967 during the Vietnam War, in the village of Đắk Sơn, Phước Long province, South Vietnam.

== Massacre ==
Prior to the attack, earlier battles had occurred between the Viet Cong (VC) and the village militias. On 5 December 1967, two VC battalions attacked Dak Son village, and after a battle with the militia, killed 252 civilians and kidnapped an estimated 100 civilians in a "vengeance" attack on the hamlet of Đắk Sơn, home to over 2,000 Montagnards. The VC believed that the hamlet had at one point given aid to refugees fleeing VC forces. An additional 800 displaced Montagnard had previously arrived to Dak Son from nearby villages that had been taken over by the VC.

Troops marched into a village near Dak Son, some of whom used flamethrowers effectively. As the VC fired their weapons, people were incinerated inside their own homes, and some who had managed to escape into foxholes in their homes died of smoke inhalation. The homes that were not destroyed by flamethrowers were destroyed with grenades, and on the way out patches of the main town were set afire. Before leaving the village, the VC shot 60 of the 160 survivors. The remaining 100 were taken hostage.

== Vietnamese government claim ==
According to the Vietnamese government there was no massacre by the VC, but rather many civilians were actually killed by U.S. incendiary bombing.

== Gallery ==
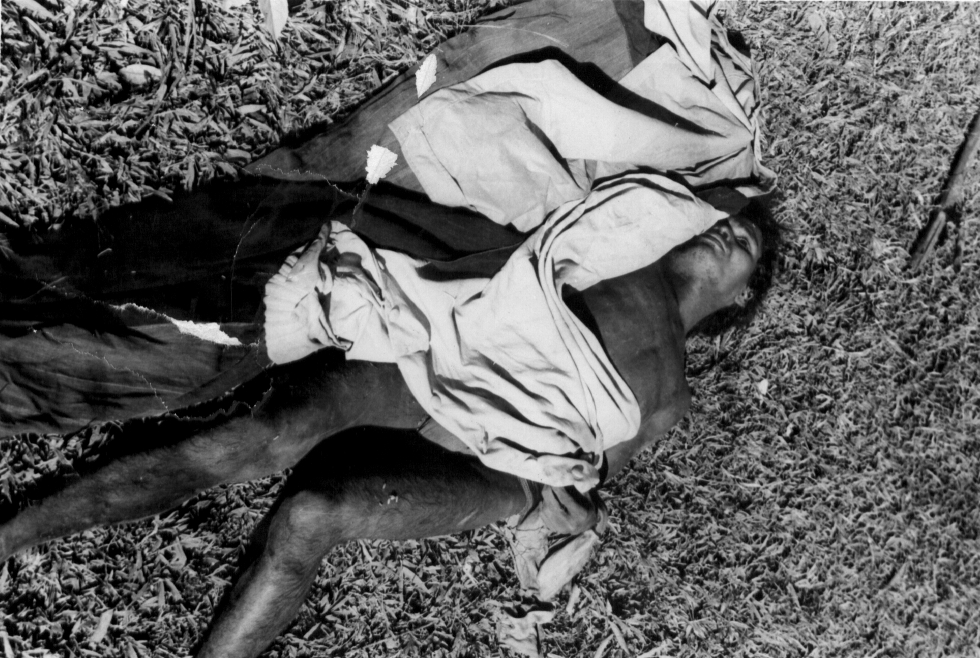

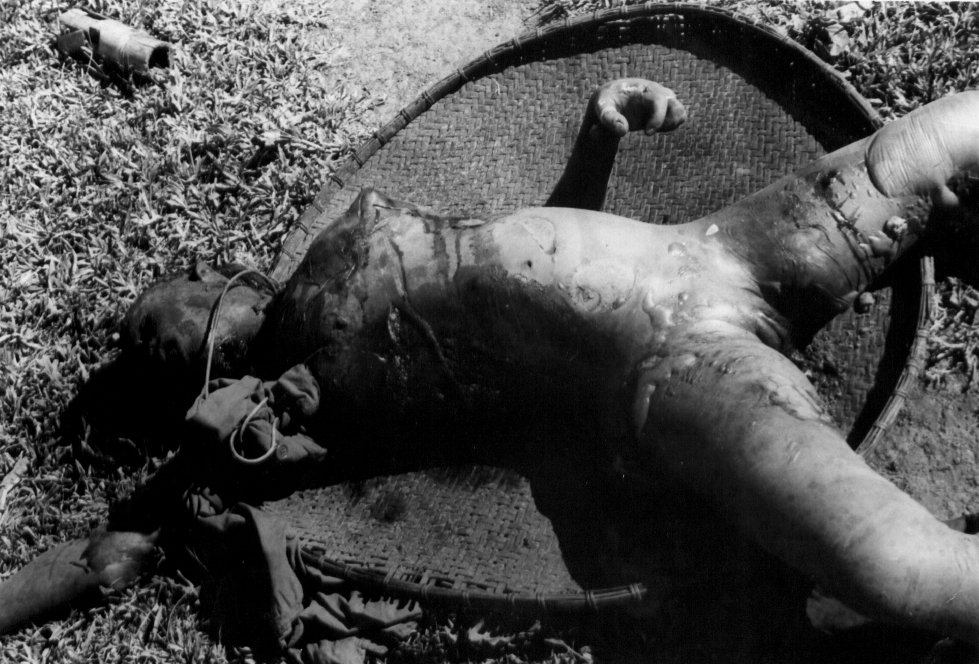

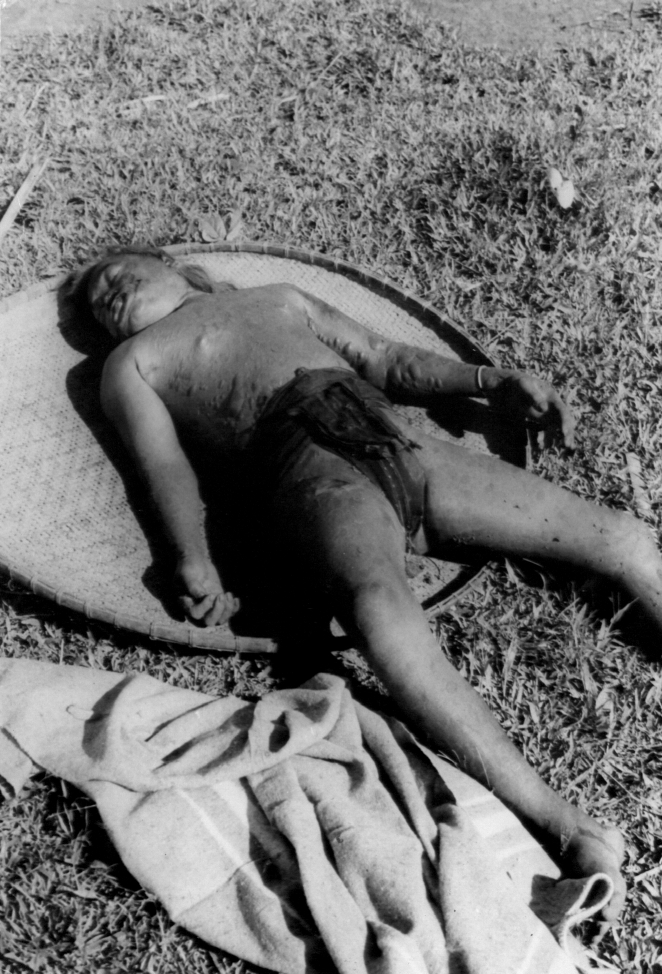

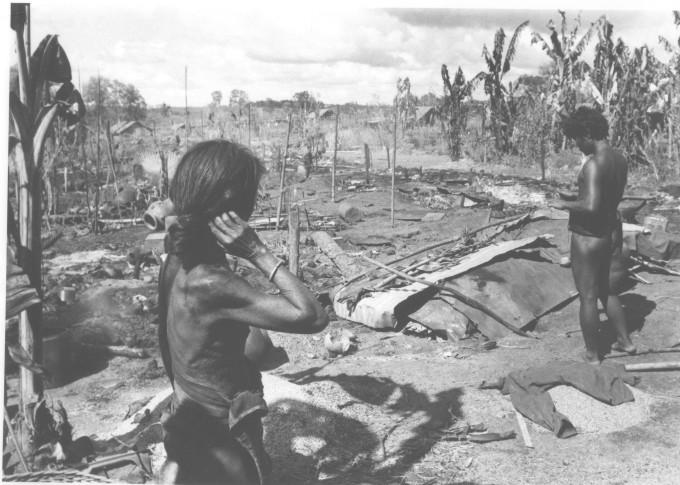

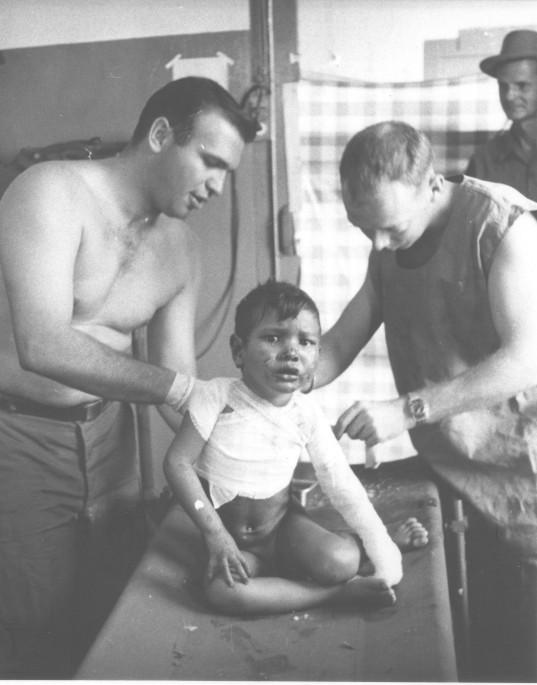

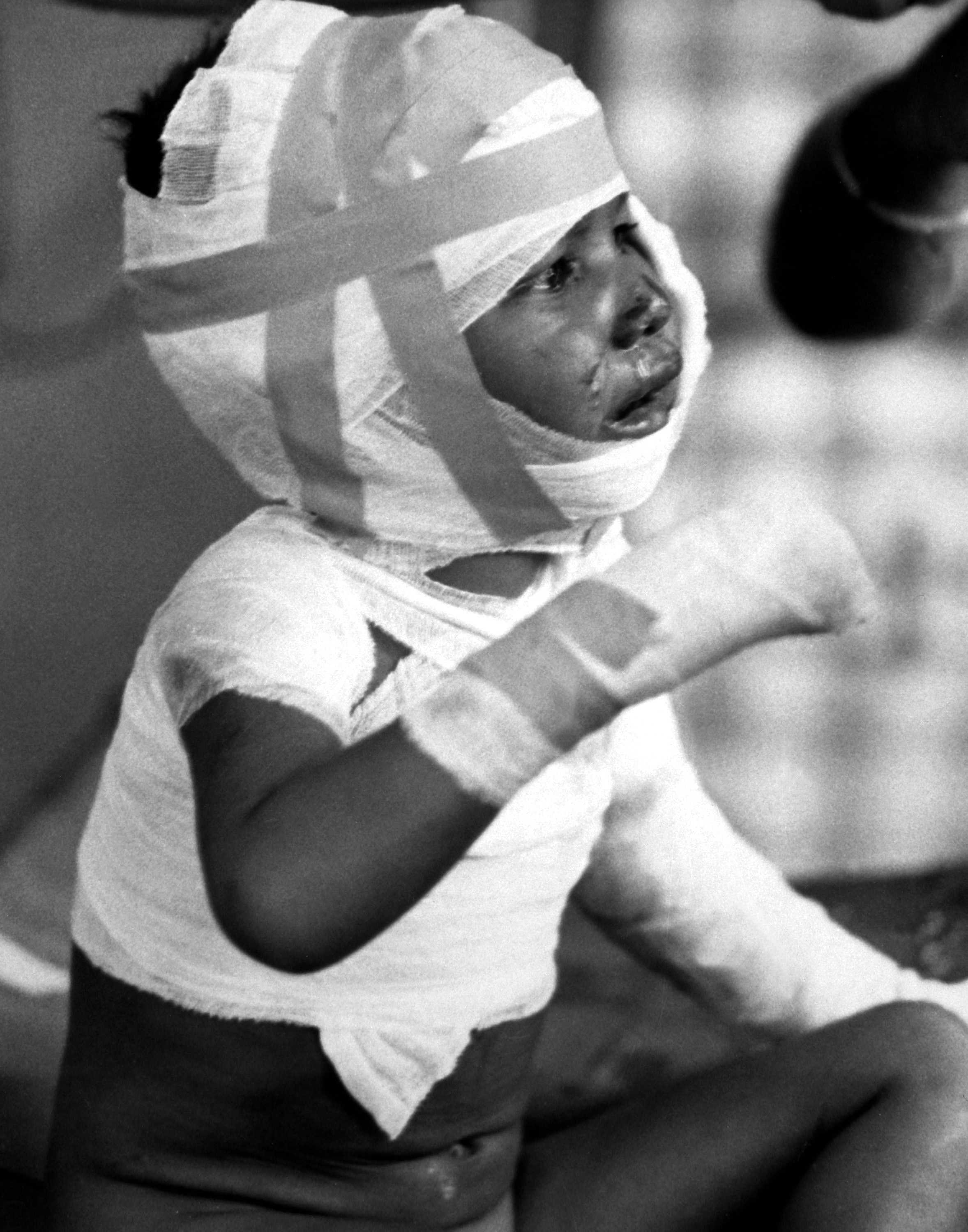

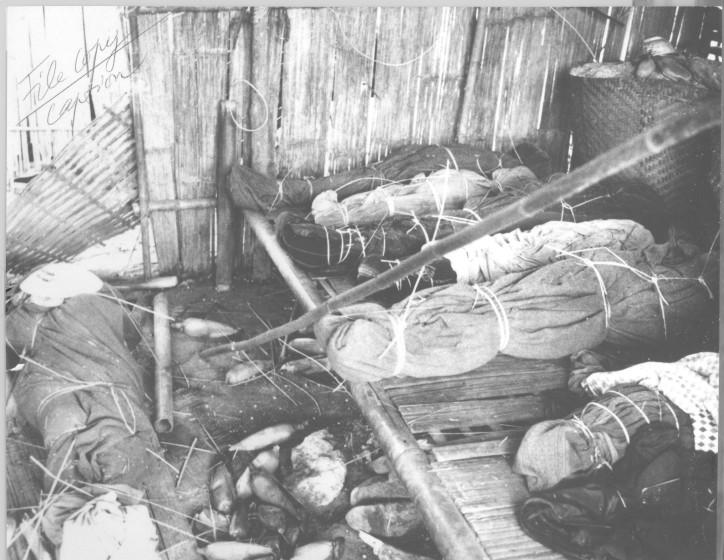

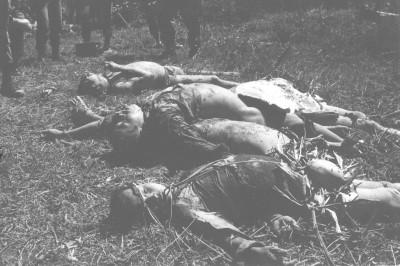

== See also ==
- List of massacres in Vietnam
- Viet Cong and People's Army of Vietnam use of terror in the Vietnam War
- War crimes
