= People's Self-Defense Force =

- Nhân dân tự vệ
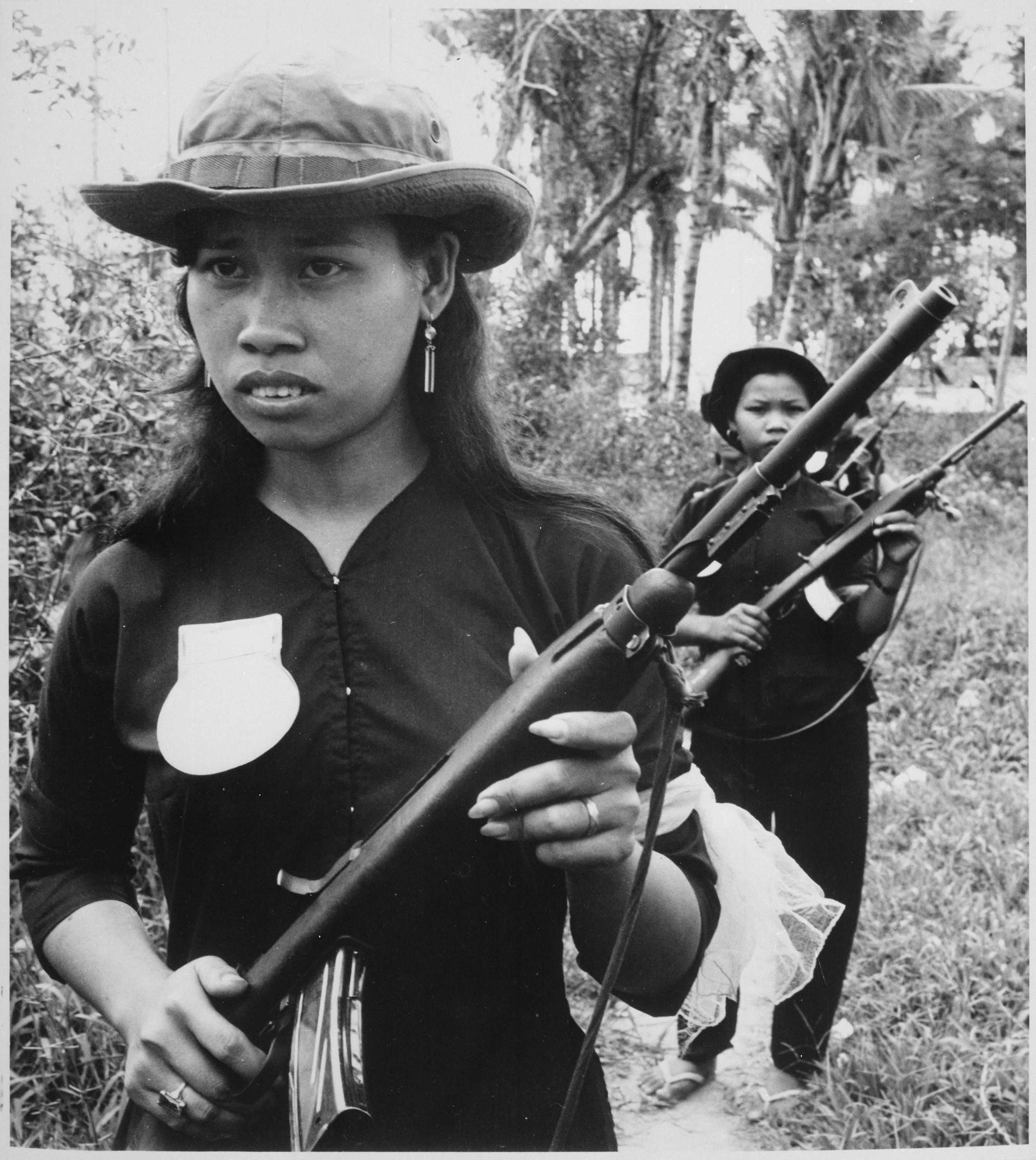
- Female members of the People's Self-Defense Force of Kien Dien, in Bến Cát District, Bình Dương Province
- Active: 1968–1975
- Disbanded: 30 April 1975
- Country: South Vietnam
- Type: Militia
- Size: 2–3 million (1972)
- Engagements: Vietnam War

Insignia
- Identification symbol

The People's Self-Defense Force (Vietnamese: nhân dân tự vệ) was a South Vietnamese part-time village level militia during the Vietnam War. The People's Self-Defense Force mainly protected homes and villages from attacks by the Viet Cong (VC) and the People's Army of Vietnam (PAVN).

== History ==
In the aftermath of the Tet Offensive a joint session of the South Vietnamese legislature agreed on a military mobilization law which was promulgated on 19 June 1968. The bill lowered the military draft age from 20 to 18 and allowed the government to conscript males between the ages of 18 and 38 for service in either the regular Army of the Republic of Vietnam (ARVN) or the territorial Regional Force and Popular Forces. The term of service was made indefinite, or as long as the war lasted. In addition, the legislation specified that youths of 17 and men between the ages of 39 and 43 could be conscripted for noncombat military service, and all other males between 16 and 50 were to serve in a new paramilitary organization, the People's Self-Defense Force, a part-time hamlet militia.

The PSDF force structure consisted of two components: combat and support. The basic building block of the combat PSDF was the 11-man team made up of a team leader, a deputy, and three 3-man cells. Three such teams formed a section of 35 men under a section leader and a deputy. If a locality had more than one section, then two or three sections could be assembled into a group which was the biggest PSDF combat unit led by a group leader and a deputy. All team, section, and group leaders and deputies were elected by PSDF members on the basis of their leadership qualities. Support elements were all volunteers. They were also organized into teams, sections, and groups but separated into different categories: elders, women, and teenagers, as dictated by traditional Vietnamese culture. These supporting elements provided such services as first-aid, education, social welfare, and entertainment. Able-bodied young women could join the combat PSDF if they so desired, on a voluntary basis. In rural areas, many peasant girls volunteered as combat members and were organized into separate cells. Combat PSDF groups were issued rifles, carbines, submachine guns and shotguns. Some groups even received automatic rifles in limited numbers during the later stages of the war.

In relatively secure areas, the PSDF could be employed to assist the National Police in maintaining law and order, defending against PAVN/VC sabotage and terrorist actions, and interdicting PAVN/VC penetrations. Where security was less certain, the PSDF were organized only in those hamlets protected by territorial forces. As soon as an insecure area became free of PAVN/VC, the PSDF gradually took over the security role in the place of Regional and Popular Force units which would be redeployed to other areas still under contest. However, when this occurred the RF/PF would usually leave behind a small reaction force. In this way, the PSDF gained in strength and stature as governmental control expanded.

PSDF duties consisted in general of maintaining security within the hamlet or the city bloc. They mounted guard, conducted patrols and supported the police or military forces by gathering intelligence, providing first-aid, assisting in medical evacuation, constructing defense barriers, installing simple booby traps, and acting as messengers. Depending on their abilities, they also participated in community development activities in the hamlet. The PSDF employed guerrilla tactics; they did not take up fixed defense positions but moved to alert positions only at night in cells of 3. They rarely confronted the PAVN/VC directly unless their force was small and easy to destroy. Their capabilities were usually limited to warning the hamlet people and the nearest friendly force, and taking up concealed positions along the path of the PAVN/VC's approach, harassing and sniping at them. Whenever confronted by a superior PAVN/VC force, PSDF members hid their weapons and acted as ordinary people. As a rule, the PSDF never ventured outside the hamlet defense perimeter but they might join the PF in night ambushes on approaches to the hamlet, or participate in PF patrols outside the hamlet, usually under PF leadership. When warranted by the situation, they could also temporarily man a PF outpost while the PF laid ambushes or conducted patrols outside of the hamlet. This arrangement augmented the PF capabilities and enhanced the security of the hamlet. In many cases of PAVN/VC penetrations, the hardy and more experienced PSDF members even violated the rule by joining the PF to fight back as a reaction force. However, their most significant contribution in cases of PAVN/VC penetration of the hamlet was to organize the people into passive resistance and non-cooperation.

To ensure that the PSDF could perform their role effectively, a relatively comprehensive training program was devised. A four-week formal training course was conducted at national training centers for team and section leaders. Although shorter in duration, these courses were comprehensive enough and compared favorably with PF platoon and squad leader basic courses. Training for PSDF members was conducted by mobile training teams provided by sector headquarters. These teams normally consisted of an RF officer, a PF platoon leader, a policeman, two or three experienced RF enlisted men and Revolutionary Development cadres. The training was performed in the hamlet for a few hours during the day and so arranged to avoid disrupting normal activities of PSDF members. Supporting PSDF members also progressed through a similar training program but it was more technically and politically oriented.

By mid-1972 the PSDF had a paper strength of 2–3 million.
