= List of massacres in Vietnam =

The following is a list of massacres that have occurred in Vietnam and its predecessors:

Name	Date	Location	Deaths	Perpetrator
Siege of Vijaya during the Champa–Đại Việt War (1471)	1471	Modern day An Nhơn, Gia Lai	60,000 killed during the war, 40,000 city dwellers were executed in the aftermaths according to the Đại Việt sử ký toàn thư	Đại Việt army under king Lê Thánh Tông
1509 Massacre against Chams	1509	Hanoi	All Cham slaves and fugitives in the capital of Hanoi were murdered	King Lê Uy Mục of the Lê dynasty of Đại Việt
1782 Saigon massacre	1782	District 5, Ho Chi Minh City	4,000–20,000 Chinese civilians	Vietnamese Tây Sơn force under Nguyễn Nhạc
1885 Thừa Thiên massacre	May 23, 1885	Thừa Thiên, French Indochina	1,200	French Armed Forces
Haiphong incident	November 23, 1946	Haiphong, French Indochina	6,000	French Armed Forces
Mỹ Trạch massacre	November 29, 1947	Mỹ Trạch village, Mỹ Thủy commune, Lệ Thủy District, Quảng Bình Province	300+	French Armed Forces
Quảng Nam massacre	12 June 1948	Hà Thanh village (Điện Bàn district) and Giảng Đông village (Hòa Vang district), Quảng Nam province	400 killed (mainly women, children, and elderly people)	French Foreign Legion
Vũng Tàu massacre	July 21, 1952	Vũng Tàu	20 killed	Viet Minh
Quỳnh Lưu uprising	November 2–14, 1956	North Vietnam	1,022 killed	People's Army of Vietnam
Châu Đốc massacre	July 11, 1957	Châu Đốc in An Giang Province, South Vietnam	17	Anti-government insurgents
Huế Phật Đản shootings	May 8, 1963	Huế, South Vietnam	8–9 Buddhists	Army and security forces of the government of Ngo Dinh Diem
Xá Lợi Pagoda raids	August 21, 1963	Many Buddhist temples across South Vietnam, most notably the Xá Lợi Pagoda in Saigon	Estimates range up to hundreds	Army of the Republic of Vietnam Special Forces under orders from Ngô Đình Nhu
1965 Embassy of the United States in Saigon bombing	March 30, 1965	Saigon, South Vietnam	22 killed	Viet Cong
1965 Saigon bombing	June 25, 1965	Saigon River, Saigon, South Vietnam	42 killed	Viet Cong
Bình An/Tây Vinh massacre (disputed)	February 12, 1966 – March 17, 1966	Tây Sơn District of Bình Định Province, South Vietnam	1,004 killed	Republic of Korea Armed Forces
Binh Tai massacre (disputed)	October 9, 1966	Binh Tai village, Phước Bình, Sông Bé Province, South Vietnam	168	Republic of Korea Armed Forces
Bình Hòa massacre (disputed)	December 3, 1966 to December 6, 1966	Bình Hòa village, Quảng Ngãi Province, South Vietnam	430	Republic of Korea Armed Forces
Thuy Bo incident (disputed)	January 31, 1967 to February 1, 1967	Thuy Bo, Điện Bàn District, Quảng Nam Province, South Vietnam	145	United States Marine Corps
Bamboo Pickers Incident	October 1967	Ba Ria–Vung Tau province	5	1st Australian Task Force
Đắk Sơn massacre	December 5, 1967	Đắk Sơn, Phước Long Province, South Vietnam	114–252	Viet Cong
Massacre at Huế	January 31, 1968 to February 28, 1968	Huế	2,800-6,000 killed	Viet Cong and People's Army of Vietnam
Phong Nhị and Phong Nhất massacre (disputed)	February 12, 1968	Phong Nhị and Phong Nhất hamlets, Điện Bàn District of Quảng Nam Province, South Vietnam	69–79	Republic of Korea Armed Forces
Hà My massacre (disputed)	February 25, 1968	Hà Mỹ village, Quảng Nam Province, South Vietnam	135	Republic of Korea Armed Forces
My Lai Massacre	March 16, 1968	Mỹ Lai and My Khê hamlets, Sơn Mỹ, Quảng Ngãi, South Vietnam	504	U.S. Army
Son Tra massacre	June 28/9, 1968	Sơn Trà, Bình Sơn District, Quảng Ngãi, South Vietnam	88	Viet Cong
Thanh Phong massacre (disputed)	February 25, 1969	Thanh Phong village of Bến Tre Province, South Vietnam	21	U.S. Navy
Son Thang massacre	February 19, 1970	Son Thang, South Vietnam	16 killed	U.S. Marine Corps
Thạnh Mỹ massacre	June 11, 1970	Thạnh Mỹ Village, Quế Sơn District, Quảng Nam Province, South Vietnam	78	Viet Cong
Đức Dục massacre	March 29, 1971	Đức Dục District, Quảng Nam Province, South Vietnam	103	Viet Cong and People's Army of Vietnam
Shelling of Highway 1	April 24–Sep 28, 1972	Highway 1, between Quảng Trị and Huế, South Vietnam	2800	People's Army of Vietnam
Shelling of Cai Lay schoolyard	August 30, 1973	Cai Lậy District, Định Tường province	32 killed	Viet Cong
Tân Lập massacre	September 24, 1977	Tân Lập commune, Tân Biên district, Tây Ninh province	592	Khmer Rouge Forces
Ba Chúc massacre	April 18, 1978	Ba Chúc, Tri Tôn, An Giang province	3,157	Khmer Rouge Forces
Tong Chup massacre	March 9, 1979	Tong Chup village, Hung Dao commune, Cao Bằng	42	People's Liberation Army of China
Krông Pắk stabbing [vi]	8 August 1998	Krông Pắk district, Đắk Lắk province	12	Dương Văn Môn
2015 Bình Phước massacre	July 7, 2015	Chơn Thành district, Bình Phước province	6	Nguyễn Hải Dương
2020 Đồng Tâm raid	January 9, 2020	Đồng Tâm, Mỹ Đức district, Hanoi	4	Hanoi Mobile Police under orders from Ministry of Public Security Đồng Tâm radicalized villagers, under the influence of Lê Đình Kình
2023 Đắk Lắk attacks	June 11, 2023	Ea Tiêu and Ea Ktur police station, Cư Kuin district, Đắk Lắk province	9 (4 police officers, 2 officials, and 3 civilians)	Đêga state
