= Hanoi Circuit =

Racing circuit in Hanoi, Vietnam

Coordinates: 21.0133°N 105.7614°E

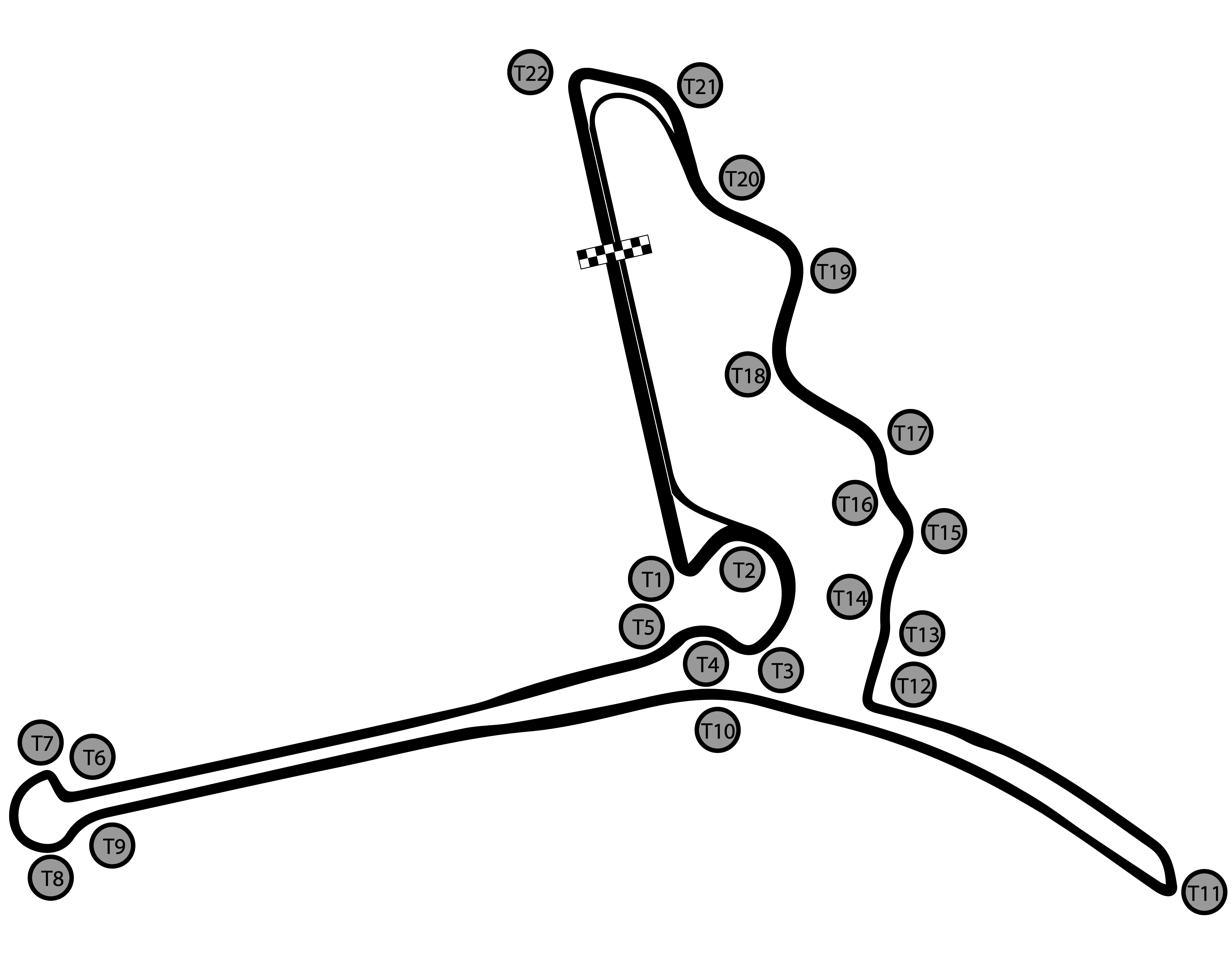
- Original proposed layout of the Grand Prix Circuit with 22 turns
- Location: (Vietnam) Nam Từ Liêm, Hanoi
- FIA Grade: 1 (intended)
- Architect: Hermann Tilke
- Major events: Formula One; Vietnamese Grand Prix (2020 intended)
- Website: f1vietnamgp.com Archived March 4, 2021, at the Wayback Machine

Grand Prix Circuit
- Surface: Asphalt
- Length: 5.613 km (3.488 mi)
- Turns: 23

The Hanoi Circuit or Hanoi Street Circuit (Vietnamese: Trường đua đường phố Hà Nội) is a motor racing venue located in the Nam Từ Liêm district of Hanoi, the capital of Vietnam. It is a street circuit designed to host the Vietnamese Grand Prix, a planned round of the Formula One World Championship. The circuit is 5.613 km (3.488 mi) long and was designed by circuit architect Hermann Tilke.

== History ==
The Hanoi Circuit was originally expected to make its debut on the Formula One calendar in 2020 with the inaugural Vietnamese Grand Prix, but the race was cancelled in response to the COVID-19 pandemic. The planned next Formula One race on the circuit was also dropped from the 2021 calendar due to the arrest of Hanoi People's Committee Chairman Nguyễn Đức Chung, a key official responsible for the race, on corruption charges.

The circuit, going anticlockwise, was located next to the Mỹ Đình National Stadium and consisted of a temporary street section and a purpose-built layout that was intended to be open to the public once completed. It also features one of the longest straights on the calendar at 1.5 km (0.9 mi) in length. The purpose-built section drew inspiration from several existing circuits including the Circuit de Monaco, Suzuka Circuit, Sepang International Circuit and the Nürburgring "GP-Strecke". This philosophy of adapting corners from other circuits had previously been used in designing the layout of the Circuit of the Americas.

The original layout consisted of 22 corners, but this was revised in December 2019 to include an additional corner in the third sector. The extra corner was added to improve safety. Construction of the circuit was completed in February 2020.

The circuit has been closed to the public since the cancellation of the planned Grand Prix, with the exception of between 31 December 2022 and 1 January 2023, when it hosted a Honda Thanks Day event. On 14 April 2024, the main straight was used as the venue for the 50th anniversary of the Mobile Police Command's Traditional Day parade. In 2026, several staff of Vietnam Television confirmed that the circuit will be used to film parts of Sasuke Vietnam season 6.

As the full circuit has never been used for a race, the only representation of the complete circuit is in the video game F1 2020, which retains the original 2020 season calendar; that rendition was featured as the second round of the 2020 Formula One Esports Series.

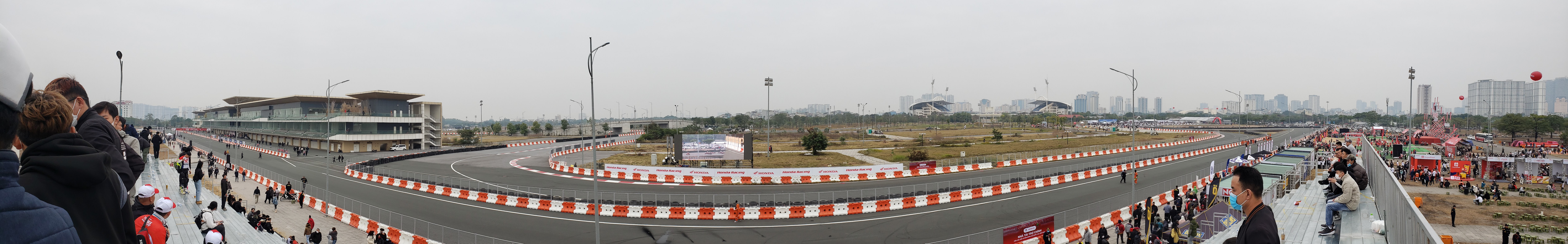
Panoramic view of the start/finish line of the Hanoi Circuit in December 2022
