= 2017 Hanoi hostage crisis =

Kidnapping of 38 Vietnamese police officers

- Date: April 15–22, 2017
- Location: Đồng Tâm, Mỹ Đức, Hanoi, Vietnam
- Caused by: Arrest without warrant of four villagers
- Goals: Release of captured representatives
- Methods: Hostage taking
- Result: Hostages released based on promises which were broken; police raid three years later.

Parties
Đồng Tâm villagers	(Vietnam) Hanoi government: Mỹ Đức government; Hanoi Mobile Police

Lead figures
• Lê Đình Kình †	• People's Committee chair Nguyễn Đức Chung • Criminal Police Department director Hồ Sỹ Tiến

Number
Dozens	Dozens

Casualties
- Deaths: 4 (3 polices + Lê Đình Kinh)
- Injuries: 2
- Detained: 38
- Charged: None

Thirty-eight Vietnamese police officers were taken hostage by villagers in Đồng Tâm commune, Mỹ Đức district, Hanoi on April 15, 2017, after police arrested four villagers without a warrant in a land dispute. The hostages included district People's Committee deputy chief Đặng Văn Triều, Deputy Chief of Public Security Nguyễn Thanh Tùng, district party committee propaganda chief Đặng Văn Cảnh, and two journalists. Two days after the initial hostage-taking, three detainees were released by the police in Hanoi; one was the main representative of the people in the land dispute, Lê Đình Kình, an 82-year-old man who was injured and hospitalized. In response, the villagers released 15 policemen; three more escaped.

On April 22, the villagers released the rest of the hostages after securing concessions from the government. Three years later, one thousand policemen returned to the village and killed its representative.

Disputes over land rights are common in Vietnam, and government agencies reserve the right to seize farmland for construction and investment projects. The 2017 hostage crisis was a rare act of defiance in Vietnam, where anger at official corruption and land seizures simmers but is usually met with a forceful response from the police.

== Cause ==
The incident was triggered by the Đồng Tâm commune's opposition to the Mỹ Đức District government assigning their land to the Viettel Group, a company owned and managed by the Vietnamese Ministry of Defence, for the construction of their factory complex. According to the newspaper Người Cao Tuổi, the area of Miếu Môn (adjacent to Đồng Tâm) served as the site of a temporary airport during the Vietnam War. In 1980, after the Sino-Vietnamese War, the government of Vietnam retrieved 208 ha (510 acres) to build an airport. Because the project was not implemented, Brigade 28 of the Vietnam People's Air Force returned the land to Đồng Tâm.

In 2014, the city council of Hanoi returned 236.7 hectares (585 acres)—28.7 ha (71 acres) more than the initial 208 ha—to the Ministry of Defense. The people of Đồng Tâm claimed the 28.7 ha as part their agricultural land. The Ministry of Defense allocated 50 ha (120 acres) of this land in 2015 to the Viettel Group, which included 46 ha (110 acres) belonging to Đồng Tâm.

== Events ==
=== Villagers' view ===
On April 15, 2017, according to a villager who spoke to the BBC, the police invited representatives of the villagers involved in the land dispute to measure the border between the military and agricultural land; they then detained the four representatives without arrest warrants. Some of the villagers tried to retrieve the representatives, clashing with police. Five more villagers were detained; one young villager was severely injured, and had to be taken to the hospital. Other police officers tried to disperse the crowd, but more than 30 were taken hostage. By April 17, journalists and other individuals had arrived to negotiate the release of 38 hostages.

=== Authorities' report ===
According to the Hanoi authorities, the military land was misused. A trial for disrupting public order was decided on March 30, leading to the decision to arrest four people. Hanoi authorities said that they were taking measures to rein in the situation, with rescuing the detained officers prioritized. They urged residents to stay calm and cooperate, ensuring the officers' safety. Media coverage was scarce.

== Timeline ==
=== April 17 ===
The district government reportedly cut electricity and the Internet to the commune. Lawyer Trần Vũ Hải posted on Facebook that he and fellow lawyers Nguyễn Hà Luân and Lê Văn Luân had arrived at the village and were negotiating with both sides. The villagers said that they did not trust the district and commune police, and Hanoi mayor Nguyễn Đức Chung should fetch the hostages after releasing the detained villagers; they were also angry with Vietnam Television coverage of the incident. Chung promised to release the detainees in one hour, and adjudicate the land dispute the following day. The Hanoi police released three detainees. The main representative, Lê Đình Kinh, age 82, was injured and was brought to the hospital for an operation. The villagers released 15 policemen, and 3 more escaped. Twenty hostages remained.

=== April 18 ===
Trần Vũ Hải said that Mayor Chung told him he did not promise anything, but the villagers and other lawyers also heard him. Major general Bạch Thành Định of the Ministry of Public Security said, "As chief of the investigation department of the Public Security in Hanoi, I confirm that the temporary release of the [three] detainees is not a deal with the local revolutionaries." He also said that he would take the group leaders to court. Until noon, roads to the village were blocked by piles of logs and mounds of gravel. During the evening, the deputy chief of the committee of party members of the capital of Hà Nội Đào Đức Toàn said that the committee delegated Nguyễn Đức Chung to meet, discuss and solve the problems of the people of the district of Mỹ Đức.

=== April 19 ===
National Assembly members Lê Thanh Vân of the city of Hải Phòng and Dương Trung Quốc of the province of Đồng Nai agreed that Chung should discuss the issue with the residents of Đồng Tâm; Quốc said, "(To build) belief is not better than to speak with the people". Lê Thanh Vân said, "A military project to build an airport begun in 1980, stopping and starting because of national security, wasting agricultural land. Why? The people of Đồng Tâm need to speak to the mayor of Hanoi, but there is no answer. Why?"

=== April 20 ===
During the afternoon, Mayor Nguyễn Đức Chung went to the Mỹ Đức district to discuss dealing with the residents of Đồng Tâm with the party committee. Speaking to the online newspaper Zing.vn, a Đồng Tâm villager said that they received a notice that every village should send 10 people to the district office to speak with Mayor Chung: "We [would] rather have Mr. Chung go to Đồng Tâm to speak with the people than we go to the district". At an afternoon press conference with foreign media about the events in Đồng Tâm, Lê Thị Thu Hằng of the Ministry of Foreign Affairs said that Hanoi was dealing with the situation according to Vietnamese law and guaranteed the legal rights of everyone involved.

=== April 21 ===
Only a representative of the commune of Đồng Tâm attended a meeting; no villagers were present. Chung said, "Tomorrow [and] the day after that I am ready to talk with the villagers of Đồng Tâm ...". He appealed to them to obey the law, remove the roadblocks, and release the 20 police officers and officials to their families.

Hanoi National Assembly member Trần Thị Quốc Khánh said that a Hanoi assembly member would meet with Mỹ Đức voters in the morning: "Since being elected less than a year ago, I met with voters but nobody has discussed the matter with Hanoi's representatives yet. We are ready to listen, [and] we also make our telephone number public for people to call at any time. I believe that the most important thing is discussion, meeting and listening to the people. In all the problems, both sides have to act according to the law and not without thinking and only feeling." Hoành deputy chief Lê Đình Ba said that the villagers had released Mỹ Đức political propaganda department chief Đặng Văn Cảnh, and were clearing the roads for Mayor Chung.

=== April 22 ===
Chung came to Đồng Tâm in the morning to meet with the villagers for over two hours; 50 were invited, and others could listen to a loudspeaker outside. Nine villagers expressed their views, bringing up issues which were addressed by Chung:

- About their demand that the Viettel Group stop building, Hanoi decided on April 20 to investigate the land dispute and issue a result in 45 days.
- About Mỹ Đức saying that the disputed land is military land, there was an order to stop because it was being investigated.
- About their suggestion of coming to suppress them, there would be no effort to rescue the hostages.
- About their appeal that they not be taken to court, Chung said that the arrests were improper because the police did not show arrest warrants or wear uniforms; because the people cooperated, they would be judged leniently.

The remaining 19 hostages were then released. It was later announced that Chung had promised not to investigate the incident.

== Police investigation ==
Vietnamese police began a criminal investigation of farmers in Đồng Tâm on June 13, despite a promise by Mayor Chung not to prosecute them as a result of hostage-release negotiations during the April standoff between villagers and local government. The investigation focused on the illegal detention of 38 police officers and officials and vandalism allegedly committed by farmers after a clash over the government's seizure of land in the village.

== 2020 Đồng Tâm raid ==
At dawn on January 9, 2020, more than one thousand policemen carried out a raid on Đồng Tâm and killed village representative Lê Đình Kình. Three police officers were killed, and 20 villagers who were involved in the land dispute and hostage-taking were arrested and prosecuted. According to a land-rights activist, Lê Đình Kình was shot four times in front of his wife.

== See also ==
- 2018 Vietnam protests
