= Thủy Bồ incident =

1967 engagement between US and Viet Cong forces in the Vietnam war

Thuy Bo Incident
- Location: Thủy Bồ, Điện Bàn District, Quảng Nam Province, South Vietnam
- Date: 31 January – 1 February 1967
- Target: Thủy Bồ Hamlet
- Attack type: purported Massacre
- Deaths: Vietnam claims: 145 civilians killed US claims: 101 Viet Cong killed 22 civilians killed in fighting
- Perpetrators: Company H, 2nd Battalion, 1st Marines

The Thuy Bo incident was the killing of civilians by U.S. Marines from 31 January to 1 February 1967, during the Vietnam War in Thủy Bồ village (Vietnamese: [tʰwɪj˧ ɓow˦]) in Điện Bàn District, Quảng Nam Province 15 km southwest of Đà Nẵng, in an area close to the foothills of the Central Highlands and situated near the Bo Bo Hills. Vietnamese communist sources claim that the Marines massacred civilians here and the memorial erected to the event records 145 civilian deaths, mainly women, children and elderly men. US sources claim that 22 civilians were killed in two days of fighting between Marines and the Vietcong who occupied the village.

== Description ==
The village was reported by villagers as friendly to U.S. forces before the battle.

On 31 January, Company H, 2nd Battalion, 1st Marines, was patrolling the area and at midday approached the hamlet of Thuy Bo when they were engaged by a Viet Cong (VC) main force battalion. The Marines were pinned down by .50 caliber machine gun and other automatic weapons fire from the hamlet and the Company commander Captain Edwin J. Banks called in air and artillery support on the VC. At 13:30 Banks requested the Marines' quick reaction force to reinforce their position, but even with these reinforcements the Marines were unable to advance or withdraw and remained engaged with the VC until nightfall. The following morning the Marines assaulted into Thuy Bo but were met by only scattered fire as the VC had withdrawn during the night.

By their own accounts the Marines had proceeded to "fire on anything that moves". Some of the villagers were killed during the initial assault, but the next morning villagers from Thuy Bo allege that massacres had occurred in which women, children, infants and some old men were killed deliberately and at close range after the VC had left. Prior estimates of civilian dead ranged from 100 to 400, from a handful of reports and allegations, but the village itself has recorded and memorialised 145 civilians killed, primarily women, children and old men.

From 1–2 February Vietnamese villagers brought 18 wounded villagers and the bodies of 22 dead who had been injured or killed by air, artillery and small-arms fire to the 2/1 Marines command post. Following an investigation the Battalion concluded that "these were a regrettable corollary to the fighting".

Marines casualties were five dead and 26 wounded while VC losses were estimated at 101 killed. The loss ratio was noted by writer Nick Turse as being unusually high.

== Interviews with villagers and Company H members ==
Interviews with both the villagers and Company H members were conducted by Stanley Karnow for the Vietnam: A Television History documentary series, including Banks Banks stated "... you never knew who was the enemy and who was the friend. They all looked alike. They all dressed alike. They were all Vietnamese. Some of them were Viet Cong." and that "For example a young woman of twenty-two or twenty-three years old that's pregnant, sits and watches your men walk down a trail and watches a booby trap go off and kill and wound several of your men, she knows that booby trap's there, she makes no move to warn the troops... who's to say whether she is any less the enemy then the twelve year old Vietnamese boy that's a VC that's in a ditch or trench." Banks said the order was a "search-and-destroy" operation. He denied any massacre had taken place and alleged that the Viet Cong had used human shields. He said that "the most that......may have been killed in that village in the way of civilians during that assault, and I'm being generous when I say this, it might have been ten or twelve or fifteen civilians". He said that he had "personally vocally and physically yelled up and down the line to cease fire and consolidate the position" once they were no longer receiving enemy fire.

One of the villagers, a 14 year old named Nguyen Bay stated that the village was strafed with artillery and aerial bombardment and followed up with a sweep into the village, in which the U.S. forces asked the villagers if they were VC before proceeding to shoot them. Villager Nguyen Huu stated "there were no men, only old men. There were only women and children. When they came over here, the children asked them for candies. And the women, some were eating lunch while others were pressing sugarcanes. When the Americans came they shot in short spurts. I ran outside and, about half an hour after the first gunfire, flames were shooting up. And in about an hour and a half, they all left. I then ran back to the hamlet and saw all the dead."

One of the Company H interviewees, Jack Hill stated "Our emotions were—were very low. You know cause the ah the death rate was ridiculous for what we figured was a friendly village. So, the orders were search and destroy". This was the following day when PAVN fighters had left the area following an ambush they had set up. "We were ordered to sweep, our initial orders were to sweep that village and uh, and, and, or those two villages, and we had done that. We had obviously routed the VC that were in there, and we held up right there." Villager, Nguyen Thi Nhi states "First of all, they arrived and burned everything (referring to the search and destroy). When I saw them, I was sitting. Then I was shot and shot, and I fell down. After that I did not know what else had happened."

Hill stated "We dropped a couple of grenades in the hootches to get the people out because to get one Vietnamese out of that hole that won't come. I mean you had, we didn't speak perfect Vietnamese so ah in order to get them out of there you either cranked off a couple of rounds or you dropped your M26 grenade down there and they get the message and they come on out of there. You know, if they got wounded or if they got hit that was that was the point of war. Something you have to live with." Hill said the operation was typical and that none of his squad killed any civilians. He stated they were in the village for one or two hours. Villager, Le Thi Ton stated "They turned around and laughed and then lobbed a grenade into my house. Ten persons were blown into pieces. The only person who was wounded and who survived was me. My son and everyone else just fell dead. I was wounded and extremely frightened so I crawled quickly into a corner of the house. The grenade had already exploded then, but they trained their guns on the bodies to make sure that nobody would survive. There was a baby who was only two months old. They smashed it and then threw it into the fire and then walked out. As they walked out, they suddenly turned around and opened fire again."

Villager Thuong Thi Mai stated that "Next door to me was a woman who had just given birth to her baby. The baby was about a month old. They killed the mother and smashed the baby against the wall like this. Then they used a knife to slit the baby up and then burnt it. They rubbed powdered gasoline on the baby and just burnt it. I was extremely angry. They called everybody a VC. All the women and children were called VCs. What kind of soldiers were they who could not even identify women and children? What kind of a war was this they were fighting? We were all women and children. There was not a single able-bodied man around."

Villager Nguyen Ky stated that "corpses were still strewn all around, and blood was still oozing from these bodies. There were still babies who were still clinging to their mothers' dead bodies and sucking at the breasts. These children are still living here." Following this day, "we carried these bodies to the Bo Bo military post and to the Trang military post, demanding the commanders there to stop all these outrageous activities." Among some of the village survivors there was allegations that the Marine unit ordered villagers to dig up buried bodies to "look for VC" who were killed.

Hill strongly denied allegations from the villagers of "mass murder" of civilians and that there was no VC in the village. In response to allegations of "women and children being pushed into a bunker and then a grenade being thrown in on top of them", Hill stated that it "Could have went [sic] on... I really don't know. There was a lot of screaming going on. A lot of ladies and old people and kids crying. You know, it was a mass confusion. And, to say for sure if I seen it, I couldn't, I couldn't really verify it."

== Commemoration ==
The incident is covered in Nick Turse's Kill Anything That Moves in which the unit was alleged to be "killing more civilians than VC", but writing off those killed as Viet Cong.

A memorial to the 145 victims of the incident was erected in 1977, ten years after the event. The memorial features a tall Gothic tower with a panorama of war-time village life, with Viet Cong and villagers participating in day-to-day activity at one end, and a scene of a massacring at the other end, with scenes including a soldier marked with "US" on its helmet holding an infant by the leg on one hand and a club in the other, an infant clinging to the breast of their dead mother, an angry and defiant young woman clenching her first towards the sky.

== See also ==
- List of massacres in Vietnam
- List of war crimes
- United States war crimes
