= Đồng Tâm =

Đồng Tâm may refer to several places in Vietnam, including:

- Đồng Tâm, Hai Bà Trưng District, a ward of Hai Bà Trưng District, Hanoi
- Đồng Tâm, Vĩnh Phúc, a ward of Vĩnh Yên
- Đồng Tâm, Yên Bái, a ward of Yên Bái
- Đồng Tâm, Bắc Kạn, a township and capital of Chợ Mới District, Bắc Kạn
- Đồng Tâm, Mỹ Đức, a rural commune of Mỹ Đức District, Hanoi
- Đồng Tâm, Bắc Giang, a rural commune of Yên Thế District
- Đồng Tâm, Bình Phước, a rural commune of Đồng Phú District
- Đồng Tâm, Hà Giang, a rural commune of Bắc Quang District
- Đồng Tâm, Hải Dương, a rural commune of Ninh Giang District
- Đồng Tâm, Hòa Bình, a rural commune of Lạc Thủy District
- Đồng Tâm, Quảng Ninh, a rural commune of Bình Liêu District

== See also ==
- Đồng Tâm Base Camp
