= An Thắng (disambiguation) =

An Thang or An Thắng in Vietnamese may refer to:

- An Thắng, a ward of Da Nang
- An Thắng, Bắc Kạn, a former rural commune (xã) of Pác Nặm District, Bắc Kạn Province
- An Thắng, Hải Phòng, a former rural commune (xã) of An Lão District, Hai Phong
