= F1 2020 (video game) =

2020 video game

- Cover art for the F1 Seventy Edition featuring Aston Martin Red Bull Racing's Max Verstappen, Mercedes-AMG Petronas F1 Team's Lewis Hamilton, Scuderia Ferrari's Sebastian Vettel and Renault DP World F1 Team's Daniel Ricciardo
- Developer: Codemasters Birmingham
- Publisher: Codemasters
- Composers: Miktek; James Kneen; Brian Tyler
- Series: F1
- Engine: Ego Engine 4.0
- Platforms: Microsoft Windows; PlayStation 4; Xbox One; Stadia
- Release: 10 July 2020
- Genre: Racing
- Modes: Single-player, multiplayer

F1 2020 is the official video game of the 2020 Formula 1 and Formula 2 Championships developed and published by Codemasters. It is the thirteenth title in the Formula 1 series developed by the studio and was released on 7 July for pre-orders of the Michael Schumacher Edition and 10 July for the Seventy Edition on Microsoft Windows, PlayStation 4, Xbox One and, for the first time, Stadia. The game is the twelfth main series installment in the franchise, and it features the twenty-two circuits, twenty drivers and ten teams proposed in the provisional 2020 Formula 1 World Championship.

F1 2020 features the championship as it was originally intended to be run before the COVID-19 pandemic led to the postponement or cancellation of several races. This was the final F1 game to be released independently by Codemasters before the studio was bought by EA in February 2021. The game was delisted on consoles by the end of May 2022; the Steam version followed in March 2023.

== Features ==
The COVID-19 pandemic led to the postponement or cancellation of several planned rounds of the 2020 Formula 1 World Championship, with races at other circuits held. The Circuit Zandvoort and the Hanoi Circuit — circuits which were new to the championship in 2020 — are included in the game despite the cancellations of the Dutch and Vietnamese Grands Prix. The 70th Anniversary, Eifel, Emilia Romagna, Portuguese, Sakhir, Styrian, Turkish and Tuscan Grands Prix, eight events that were added to the 2020 calendar, are not included as well as the Nürburgring, the Imola Circuit, the Portimão Circuit, the Bahrain International Circuit "Outer Circuit" layout, the Istanbul Park and the Mugello Circuit, as they use circuits that host other events. As the Vietnamese Grand Prix has not been held in the years since its intended debut in the 2020 season, the Hanoi Circuit's appearance in F1 2020 remains the only official representation of the completed circuit in any form. Along with this, the game does not include the mid-season replacements of Nico Hülkenberg at Racing Point, Jack Aitken (Note: Aitken appears in both F2 seasons with Campos and in My Team) at Williams and Pietro Fittipaldi at Haas, along with George Russell at Mercedes for the Sakhir Grand Prix.

F1 2020 introduces a team management feature known as "My Team" which allows the player to create, own, and run an eleventh team. The player will initially need to choose an engine supplier, recruit a second driver, design a livery and sign sponsors. As the career mode progresses, they will be able to upgrade the facilities at their team's headquarters and hire staff to continue development. This supplements the development tree used to upgrade the car. Codemasters had previously used the My Team mode in Dirt 4, a part of the Dirt Rally franchise.

In career mode players now have the choice to do a half, or a full Formula 2 season or only do three races as in F1 2019, known as the F2 Feeder Series, although there is no longer a rivalry story-line and no fictional drivers other than that created by the player. When playing in Formula 1, players can choose between three different season lengths of ten, sixteen or twenty-two races. They are also able to create a custom calendar should they choose a shorter season length. The driver's "acclaim" or experience level determine their virtual pay, even though this virtual money is not used in the career mode.

F1 2020 reintroduced the Split Screen mode, which was featured in F1 2014 but was removed for the next games.

For the first time in the F1 game series, the option to use a virtual rear-view mirror has been added. If the player uses the cockpit camera view, they can have the option to use that mirror to see what's going on behind them like a road car.

In F1 2020, the AI are more prone to making mistakes to give the players "a much more realistic experience".

The game introduces driver ratings for the first time, with drivers given a score out of ninety-nine for experience, racecraft, awareness and pace. The experience score provides additional 'resource points' to enable the player to upgrade their car faster in the "My Team" and "Career" modes, racecraft relates to the effectiveness of the driver's attempts at overtaking, a higher awareness score improves the ability of the driver to maintain control of their car in difficult situations and pace relates to the driver's ability to set quick lap times. The scores are derived from real life data and applies to F2 drivers as well as those from F1.

Podium Pass is new to F1 2020 and allows players to unlock cosmetic items, such as liveries, race suits and celebration animations, all of which are new to the F1 games. A VIP Podium Pass can also be purchased using in-game Pitcoins, which also includes more exclusive liveries, race suits and podium celebration animations.

At launch, the 2019 Formula 2 season is included; French driver Anthoine Hubert, who died during the feature race at the 2019 Spa-Francorchamps Formula 2 round, is also commemorated within the game as a selectable driver in "My Team". The additions of Hubert and Juan Manuel Correa, the latter of whom was also involved in the accident that killed Hubert, were a "tough decision"; the developers consulted all people relating to both drivers, which reached a mutual agreement. When the player selects Hubert, a small dedication to him will appear. Codemasters released an update in December that recreates the 2020 Formula 2 Championship, with Mick Schumacher becoming champion.

There are 16 classic cars available to use, the oldest being the 1988 McLaren MP4/4 and the newest being the 2010 McLaren MP4-25, Ferrari F10 and Red Bull RB6. Four cars — 1991 Jordan 191, 1994 Benetton B194, 1995 Benetton B195 and 2000 Ferrari F1-2000 — are available to those who purchased the Deluxe Schumacher Edition of the game, or those who purchased the regular edition of the game and later purchased downloadable content.

== Reception ==
Reception

Aggregate scores
Aggregator	Score
Metacritic	PC: 88/100; PS4: 86/100; XONE: 91/100
OpenCritic	98% recommend

Review scores
Publication	Score
Eurogamer	Recommended
IGN	9/10
PC Gamer (UK)	88/100
PCGamesN	9/10
Push Square	8/10
Shacknews	9/10

F1 2020 was released to positive reviews. The title received "generally favorable" reviews for PC and PlayStation 4 and "universal acclaim" for Xbox One, according to review aggregator Metacritic, thus making it the highest-rated Codemasters-developed F1 title on the site. Fellow review aggregator OpenCritic assessed that the game received "mighty" approval, being recommended by 98% of critics. Critics praised the new "My Team" mode, the addition of a Formula 2 mode, split-screen racing, accessibility for newcomers, and the racing itself. Critics also cite 2020 as one of the best F1 games ever published.

The game reached number one in the United Kingdom sales charts, displacing The Last of Us Part II which fell to third place. In Japan, the PlayStation 4 version sold 5,762 copies within its first week of release, making it the fourteenth bestselling retail game of the week in the country.

It was nominated for the category of Best Sports/Racing game at The Game Awards 2020, as well as "Racing Game of the Year" at the 24th Annual D.I.C.E. Awards.
