= An Thắng =

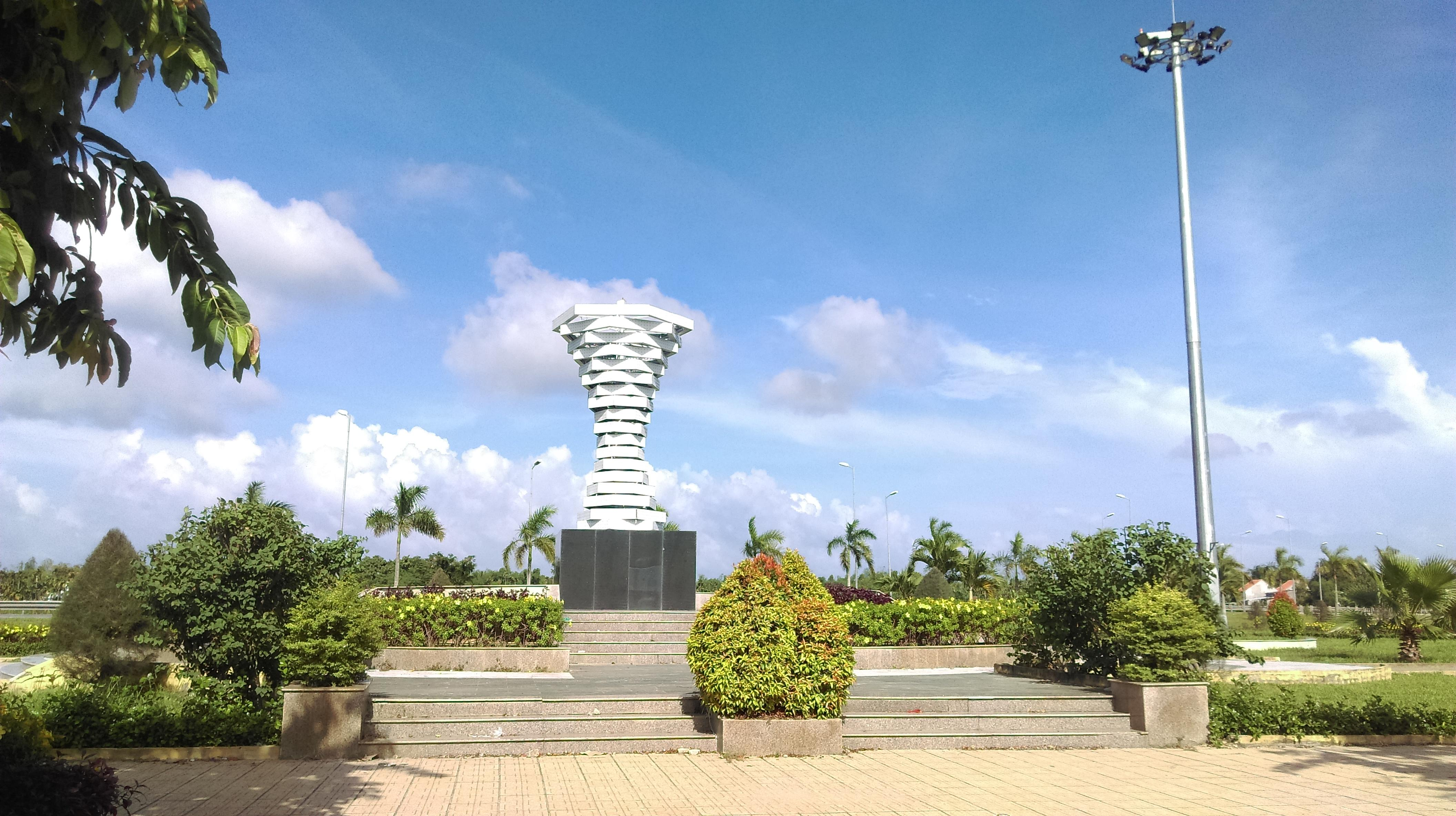
- An Thắng Park
- Interactive map of An Thắng
- Coordinates: 15.903210317604971°N 108.23888413751347°E
- Country: Vietnam
- Region: South Central Coast and Central Highlands
- Municipality: Da Nang
- Administrative headquarters: Phong Nhị Urban Quarter

Area
  - Total: 35.36 km^{2} (13.65 sq mi)

Population (2025)
  - Total: 32,143
  - Density: 908/km^{2} (2,350/sq mi)
- Website: anthang.danang.gov.vn

An Thắng is a ward in the municipality of Da Nang, Vietnam.

On 16 June 2025:

- District-level administrative units nationwide were dissolved.
- The entire area and population of Điện An, Điện Thắng Nam, and Điện Thắng Trung wards, formerly part of Điện Bàn town in the former Quảng Nam province, were merged to form a new ward named An Thắng.
