= Đức Dục massacre =

Killings in South Vietnam

- Location: 15.751°N 108.110°E; Đức Dục District, Quảng Nam Province, South Vietnam
- Date: 29 March 1971
- Attack type: Massacre, Grenade attack, mortar bombardment
- Deaths: 103 civilians, 20 ARVN soldiers
- Injuries: 96 civilians, 26 ARVN soldiers
- Perpetrators: People’s Army of Vietnam; Viet Cong

The Đức Dục Massacre was a massacre of South Vietnamese civilians committed by the People’s Army of Vietnam (PAVN) and Viet Cong (VC) during the Vietnam War, in Đức Dục District, (now Duy Phú commune, Duy Xuyên District) Quảng Nam Province, South Vietnam on 29 March 1971.

== Attack and massacre ==
At 02:10 (GMT+7) on 29 March, an estimated two battalions of the PAVN 38th Regiment, consisting largely of well-equipped North Vietnamese soldiers, reinforced by two VC sapper battalions, stormed into Đức Dục. Under cover of a mortar and rocket barrage, the PAVN struck directly at the district headquarters compound, while the sappers began systematically destroying the nearby civilian hamlets with satchel charges and by setting fires. Đức Dục's defenders, the 412th Regional Force Company and the 123rd Popular Force Platoon, with a handful of United States Army advisors, fell back to the district headquarters compound and made a defense. Soon, the PAVN had them completely surrounded and enemy infantry had reached the perimeter defensive wire. The cloud ceiling, down to 600 feet (180 m) or 800 feet (240 m), prevented fixed-wing air support from coming to the aid of the defenders.

Marine gunships from HML-167 and HML-367 at Marble Mountain Air Facility were directed to Đức Dục and found it through the clouds by the fire in the villages. As the helicopters approached, they contacted the Army advisors by radio. The advisors said via radio that the district compound was in danger of being overrun and gave the Marines clearance to fire at targets anywhere around their perimeter. The Army advisors also stated that they would be unable to direct air strikes from the ground, as enemy fire had forced them under cover. The helicopters engaged the PAVN/VC and were met with heavy automatic weapons fire. The helicopters remained in action for four hours until the PAVN/VC broke off the attack and fell back northwestward toward the Thu Bồn River, where they began wading the river and paddling across in boats. The gunships pursued the PAVN/VC and were credited with four confirmed enemy dead, a probable ten more killed and six boats destroyed. The fighting around Đức Dục continued for the next several days. Units of the ARVN 51st Regiment, sent to reinforce the RF and PF garrison, made repeated contact with the PAVN.

== Aftermath ==
In the initial attack and the two days of fighting that followed, the PAVN/VC lost at least 59 men killed, and three captured and 22 individual and six crew-served weapons captured while the RF/PF forces who had defended the compound suffered 20 dead and 26 wounded. 103 South Vietnamese civilians had died in the blazing hamlets; 96 more had been injured and 37 kidnapped. At least 1,500 homes had been destroyed. In spite of ARVN counterattacks, the 38th Regiment remained in the Đức Dục area, instead of pulling back into the mountains. On 3 April, the PAVN again attacked the Đức Dục District Headquarters and neighboring hamlets with 100 rounds of mortar fire, numerous RPG rounds, and small arms fire, but did not follow with another ground assault.

== See also ==
- List of massacres in Vietnam
- War crimes
