= Shelling of Highway 1 =

1972 terror attacks

- South Vietnamese civilians flee down Highway 1 from Quang Tri in late April
- Location: Highway 1, between Quảng Trị and Huế, South Vietnam
- Date: 30 March - 2 May 1972
- Attack type: Indiscriminate fire
- Deaths: ~2,000
- Perpetrator: People's Army of Vietnam

The Shelling of Highway 1 (Vietnamese: Đại lộ Kinh Hoàng, Highway of Horror) was the indiscriminate killing of South Vietnamese soldiers and civilians by the People's Army of Vietnam (PAVN) during the Easter Offensive of the Vietnam War, on Highway 1, between Quảng Trị and Huế, South Vietnam from 30 March to 2 May 1972.

== Background ==
On 30 March 1972 the PAVN launched the Easter Offensive against South Vietnam. In Quảng Trị Province by early April South Vietnamese forces succeeded in halting the PAVN advance at Đông Hà. By 28 April the PAVN had surrounded Quảng Trị and begun shelling the city and the only escape route was along Highway 1 with almost the entire population of 20,000 fleeing the city.

== Attack ==
South Vietnamese soldiers and civilians began fleeing Quảng Trị on foot and on any available vehicles forming columns up to 3 miles (4.8 km) long. At the same time PAVN armored and infantry units from the 324th Division moved south of Quảng Trị on either side of Highway 1 periodically firing on the Highway.

The largest group of refugees assembled in Quảng Trị for evacuation early on 29 April, although three quarters of the people in the convoy were civilians, 95 percent of the vehicles in the column were military; the majority were two and one-half ton trucks plus a considerable number of flatbeds, tankers, small trucks, jeeps and 15 ambulances. The convoy had gone approximately 6 miles (9.7 km) south on Highway 1, to the vicinity of Hải Lăng District. At this point, the convoy came under attack by PAVN direct and indirect fire. Lead vehicles were stopped immediately and mass confusion ensued. The overstretched Army of the Republic of Vietnam (ARVN) 3rd Division had failed to organise flank security for the convoy allowing the PAVN to attack, inflicting a physical and psychological blow on the South Vietnamese civilians and military.

On 1 May the 3rd Division commander gave the order to abandon Quảng Trị and all remaining ARVN forces and civilians abandoned the city and fled south along Highway 1 under fire from the PAVN. Burning trucks, armored vehicles, civilian buses and cars jammed the Highway and forced all traffic off the road in a scene that the South Vietnamese press dubbed the "Highway of Horror". A PAVN corporal with a mortar unit reported, "The people were moving on bicycles, motorbikes and buses... No one was able to escape." A solid wall of military and civilian rolling stock of every description, bumper-to-bumper and three vehicles abreast; remained on the road. Personal effects, individual equipment and bodies were piled in the vehicles and lay strewn alongside, and to the east, where individuals had attempted to flee to safety.

The Washington Post reported on 2 May that a PAVN regimental command post south of Quảng Trị was surrounded by captured refugees being used as human shields against Allied attacks.

The official PAVN history states that "Accurate fire from our long-range artillery positions created added terror among the enemy troops... Route 1 from Quảng Trị to northern Thua Thien province became a 'highway of death' for the enemy."

== Aftermath ==
During the Second Battle of Quảng Trị, South Vietnamese forces advanced from their positions on the Mỹ Chánh Line northwest of Huế and succeeded in recapturing most of Quảng Trị Province. With the area under South Vietnamese control, South Vietnamese and international reporters were able to access the area in early July and see the destruction that had taken place two months previously.

On 8 September 1972 in a press conference in Saigon, a defector from the PAVN 324th Division former private Le Xuan Thuy stated that his unit had been ordered to fire on anyone, civilian or military, moving south from Quảng Trị in late April and early May as they were all "enemies".

Estimates vary of the total number of soldiers and civilians killed, South Vietnamese journalists Dương Phục and Vũ Thanh Thủy estimated 5,000 killed, while Red Cross officials placed the death toll at 2,000, including ARVN soldiers and civilians evacuees from Quảng Trị hospitals.

== See also ==
- List of massacres in Vietnam
- War crimes
