= Hương Temple =

Complex of Gaj temples and shrines in Vietnam

Hương Temple Chùa Hương
- Chùa Hương (香寺)
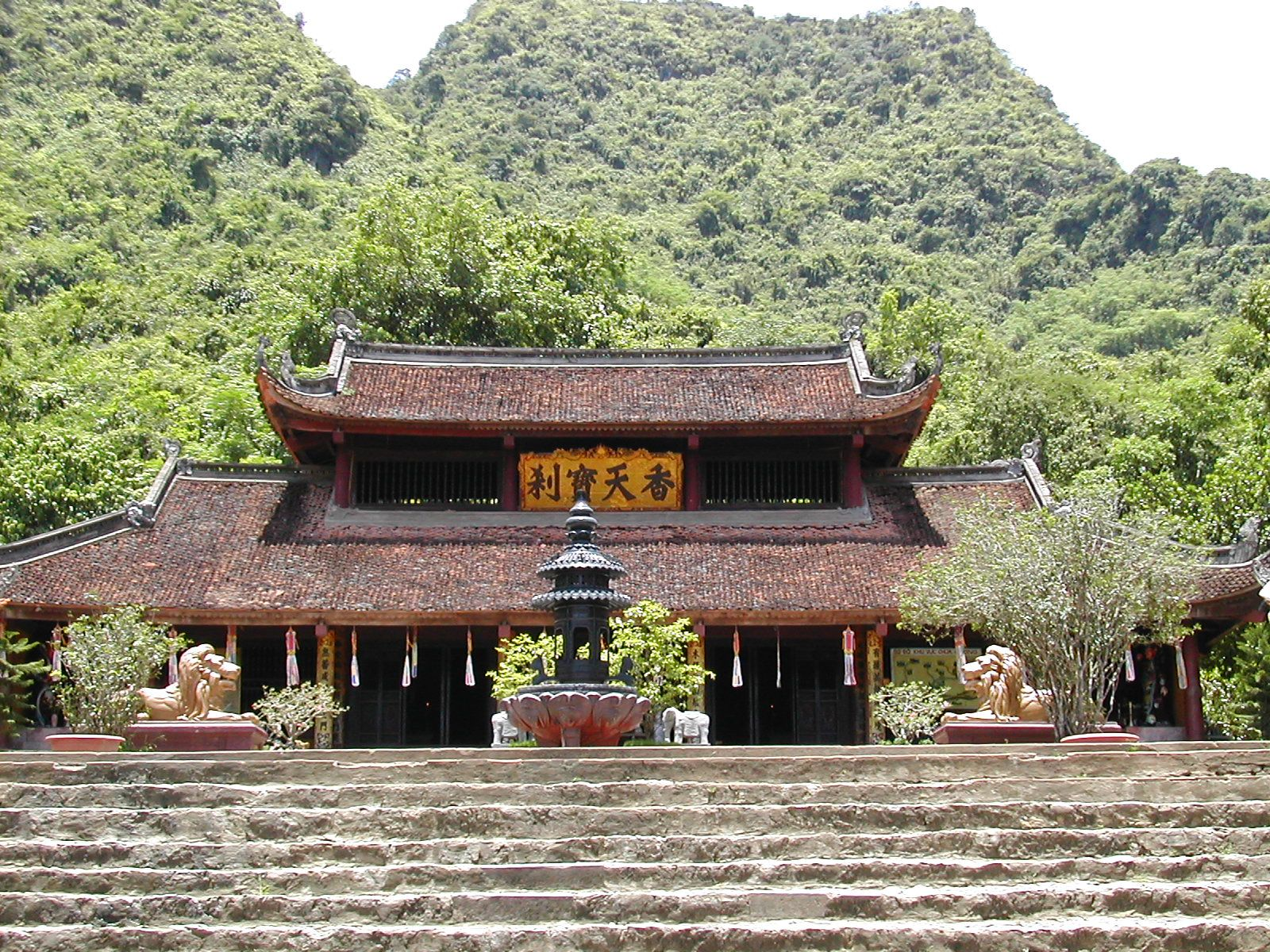
- Thiên Trù Temple, central temple within the Hương Temple complex

Religion
- Affiliation: Buddhism
- District: Mỹ Đức
- Province: Hanoi
- Deity: Gautama Buddha; Quan Âm

Location
- Country: Vietnam
- Interactive map of Hương Temple; Chùa Hương
- Coordinates: 20.62°N 105.75°E

Architecture
- Completed: 15th century

The Hương Temple (Vietnamese: Chùa Hương, Chữ Hán: 香寺) is a vast complex of Buddhist temples and shrines built into the limestone Hương Tích mountains. It is the site of a religious festival which draws large numbers of pilgrims from across Vietnam. The centre of the Hương Temple lies in Hương Sơn Commune, Mỹ Đức District, former Hà Tây Province (now Hanoi). The centre of this complex is the Hương Temple, also known as Chùa Trong (Inner Temple), located in Hương Tích Cave.

== Historical background ==
It is thought that the first temple was a small structure on the current site of Thiên Trù which existed during the reign of Lê Thánh Tông in the 15th century. Legend claims that the site was discovered over 2000 years ago by a monk meditating in the area, who named the site after a Tibetan mountain where Buddha practiced asceticism. A stele at the current temple dates the building of a terrace, stone steps and Kim Dung shrine to 1686, during the reign of Lê Hy Tông, at around the same time that Chùa Trong was being constructed. Over the years some of the structures were damaged and replaced. The original statues of Buddha and Quan Âm were cast from bronze in 1767 and replaced with the current statues in 1793. More recently, damage was done during both the French and the American wars. Both the gateway and the bell tower at Thiên Trù Temple were destroyed, the bell tower rebuilt in 1986 and the gateway completed in 1994.

== Physical layout ==
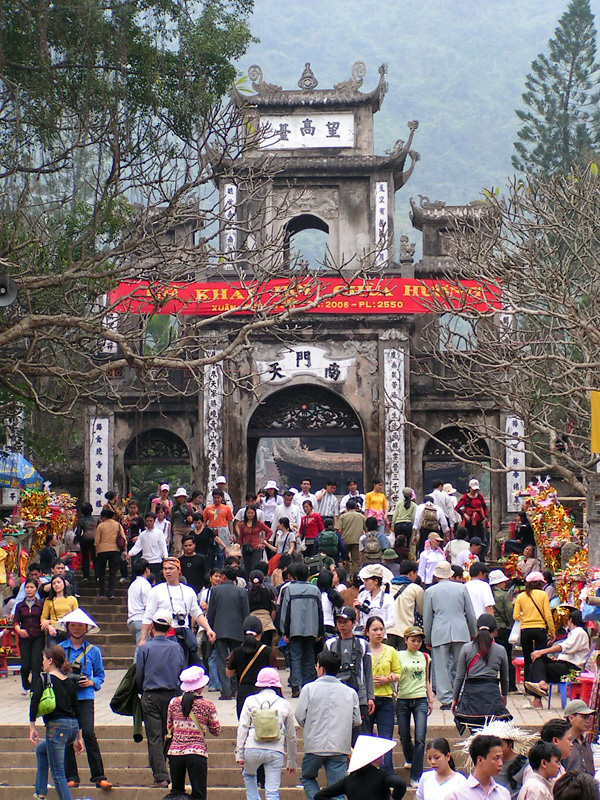
At the gateway of Thiên Trù Temple

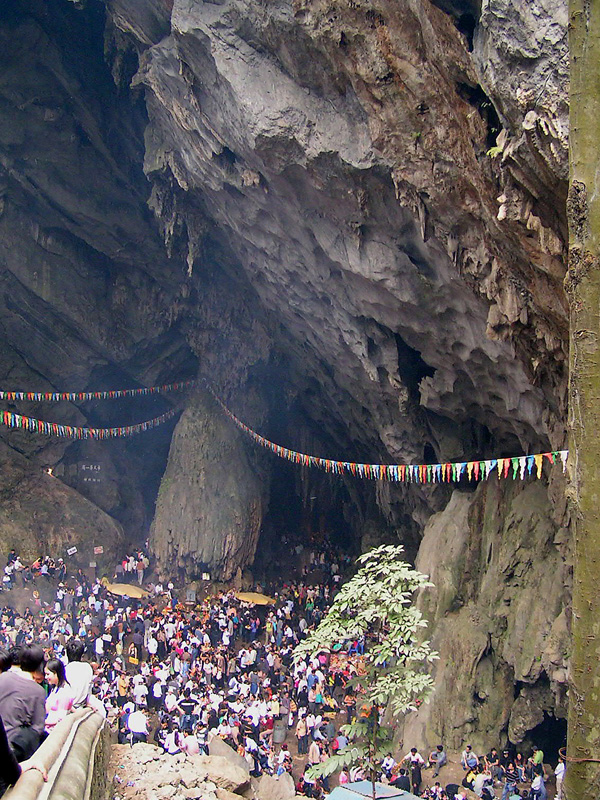
Hương Tích Cave

The many Temples that make up Chùa Hương are spread out among the limestone hills and tropical forests in the area of Hương Mountain.

=== Đền Trình ===
Approaching from the Đáy River, one will first come across Đền Trình (Presentation Shrine), also known as Đền Quan Lớn (Shrine of High-ranking Mandarin), built to worship one of the generals of a Hùng King. This large shrine has a gate with two kneeling elephant statues on each side.

=== Thiên Trù Temple ===
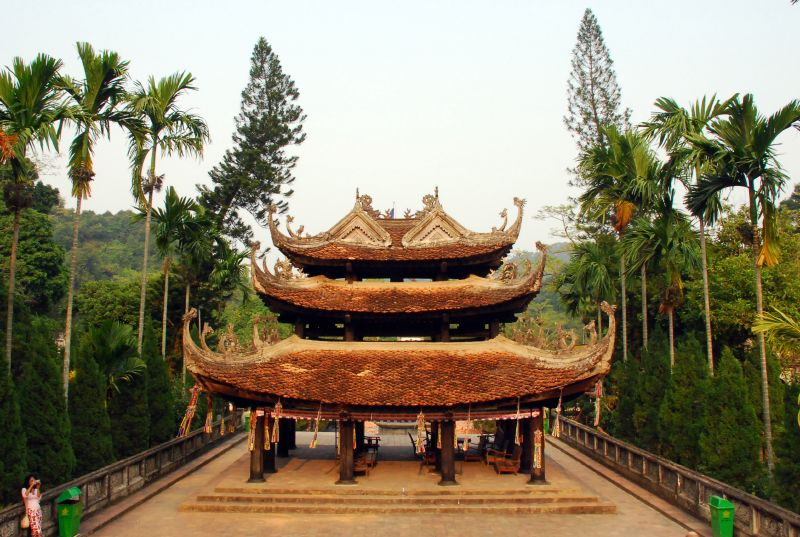
A building in Thiên Trù Temple

Beyond Đền Trình is Thiên Trù (Heaven Kitchen) Temple, also known as Chùa Ngoài (Outer Temple). Here one will find Viên Công Bảo Stupa, a brick structure where Master Trần Đạo Viên Quang, who led the reconstruction of the temple, is buried. Thiên Thủy stupa, a naturally occurring structure that is the result of the erosion of a rocky hill, is also nearby. Thiên Trù is also home to a bell tower and Hall of the Triple Gem, last restored in the 1980s. Inside the Temple there is a large statue of Quan Âm Nam Hải.

=== Giải Oan Temple ===
On the route from Thiên Trù to Hương Tích cave is Giải Oan Temple, also called 'Clearing Unjust Charges' Pagoda. Here there is a pond called Thiên Nhiên Thanh Trì (Natural Blue Pond), also called Long Tuyền Well, and Giải Oan stream, with its 9 sources.

=== Hương Tích Cave ===
The center of the Chùa Hương complex, Hương Tích Cave houses Chùa Trong (Inner Temple). The mouth of the cave has the appearance of an open dragon's mouth with Chữ Nho characters carved in a wall at the mouth of the cave. The characters (Nam thiên Đệ nhất Động) are translated as "the foremost cave under the Southern Heavens" and the carving is dated to 1770. The words are attributed by some to the ruler of that time, Tĩnh Đô Vương Lord Trịnh Sâm. Inside the cave there are many statues. There is a large statue of Buddha, as well as one of Quan Âm, both made of a green stone. Quan Âm's "left leg is stretched out and the foot lies on a lotus flower, her right leg is bent and is supported by a lotus flower with supple leaves; a hand holds a pearl." There are also statues of Arhats and various other figures. Among the naturally occurring features of the cave are numerous stalactites and stalagmites, some of which are worn smooth from years of rubbing by visitors to the cave.

Other sites included in the Chùa Hương complex are Thiên Sơn Temple, Thuyết Kinh Grotto, Phật Tích Temple, and Cửa Võng Temple.

== Popular practices ==
There are many practices associated with Chùa Hương and its various temples. Some of these are specifically Buddhist, while others are animist or part of popular religion in Vietnam.

=== Pilgrimage ===
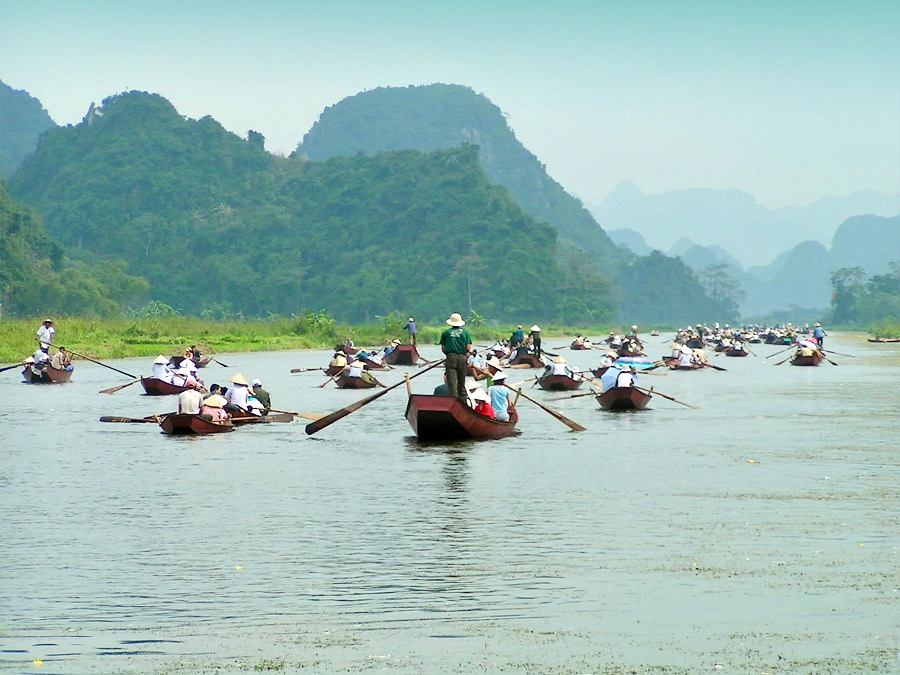
Pilgrim boats on the Yến River

Many Vietnamese people visit Chùa Hương on religious pilgrimage. The standard greetings from one pilgrim to another are "A Di Đà Phật" or "Namo Amitabha Buddha". For the purpose of pilgrimage there are various routes that one might take, but the most popular is to take a boat from Yến wharf, stopping at Trình Shrine to 'present' themselves at the 'registration shrine'. The pilgrims then make their way to Hội bridge and visit Thanh Sơn temple inside a cave. The next stop is Trò wharf, from which pilgrims travel on foot to Thiên Trù Pagoda. After Thiên Trù comes Tiên temple, followed by Giải Oan temple. It is believed that Buddha once stopped here to wash himself clean of the dust of humanity, and many pilgrims will wash their face and hands in Long Tuyền Well in hopes of washing away past karmas. While here, pilgrims may also visit Thuyết Kinh cave and Cửa Võng Shrine to worship the Goddess of the Mountains, or Phật Tích Shrine where there is a stone believed to be the preserved footprint of the Quan Âm. From here pilgrims head toward the final destination: Hương Tích Cave. At Hương Tích there are statues of deities, but many pilgrims come to get blessings from the stalactites and stalagmites, many of which are named and have special purposes. Many childless pilgrims seek fertility from Núi Cô (the girl) and Núi Cậu (the boy), while others visit stalactites and stalagmites thought to give prosperity. Pilgrims often gather under one particular stalactite, which resembles a breast, to catch drops of water in hopes of being blessed with health from the 'milk' of the 'breast'. Other names of stalactites and stalagmites include the Heap of Coins (Đụn Tiền), the Gold Tree, the Silver Tree, the Basket of Silkworms (Buồng Tằm), the Cocoon (Nong Kén) and the Rice Stack (Đụn Gạo).

=== Festival ===
The main pilgrimage season at Chùa Hương is during the Hương Temple festival, when hundreds of thousands of pilgrims make their way to Hương Tích cave and the other temples. The longest lasting festival in Vietnam, it officially begins on February 15 on the lunar calendar, but the peak in visitors lasts from the middle of January to the middle of March. The Festival is seen by some as a good opportunity for young people to find romance and begin courtships. Many restaurants in Hương Temple kill and butcher wildlife including civets, deer, porcupine, wild pig and serve it as special, rare or expensive meat which is particularly popular during the festival period.

== Popular culture ==
=== Legends ===
There are many legends about Chùa Hương and its various temples. Hương Tích cave is an especially sacred place because "the legend says that Bodhisattva (Quan Âm) went South and stayed at Hương Tích Temple in order to help save human souls." A stone at Phật Tích temple is said to be her preserved footprint.

=== References in literature ===
One particular legend about Chùa Hương has been preserved in a poem by Nguyễn Nhược Pháp. The poem tells the story of a girl who accompanied her father on pilgrimage to Chùa Hương and found love while there. The following is a translated excerpt from the poem:

Oh! Here we are at Trong Temple!
The grotto is hidden in green vegetation:
Its ceiling is embroidered with stalactites
Which look like pearls imbued with aquilaria perfume.

Much Vietnamese literature has made Chùa Hương its focus, including the following song, written by Chu Mạnh Trinh:

Delights of Hương Sơn

Standing sky high, in the land of Buddhas
Hương Sơn is a real wonder we have long wished to see
With the sight of mountains covered with clouds
This is undoubtedly "The most beautiful grotto of all"
Looking up, we can notice a beautiful picture
Brocaded with sparkling stones rich in colours
The cave is so deep, glittering in the moonlight
The entrance path with abrupt turns is so high

Hoàng Quý, a popular Vietnamese musician who lived in the early to mid-20th century, sang about the experience of visiting Chùa Hương in his song 'Hương Temple':

Hương Temple is filled with incense and aquilaria
Smoke spiralling up in the dying sun
It is the moment when one is held in deep reverie.

A Very Famous Song By Trung Đức & Lyric By Nguyễn Nhược Pháp Has been a big song in the culture of Chùa Hương

Going To Chùa Hương (Em Đi Chùa Hương) – Translated Version

Yesterday I went to Chùa Hương

Flowers are translucent mist

Also I see myself in the mirror

Small towel, high ponytail

I wear a silk undergarment

Pants comfortable, A new shirt

My hands carry Nón Quai Thao

My feet in high shoes.

Going To Chùa Hương (Em Đi Chùa Hương) – Untranslated Version

Hôm nay em đi chùa Hương

Hoa cỏ còn mờ hơi sương

Cùng thầy me em vấn đầu soi gương

Khăn nhỏ, đuôi gà cao

Em đeo dải yếm đào quần lãnh, áo the mới

Tay em cầm chiếc nón quai thao

Chân em di đôi guốc cao cao

== Gallery ==
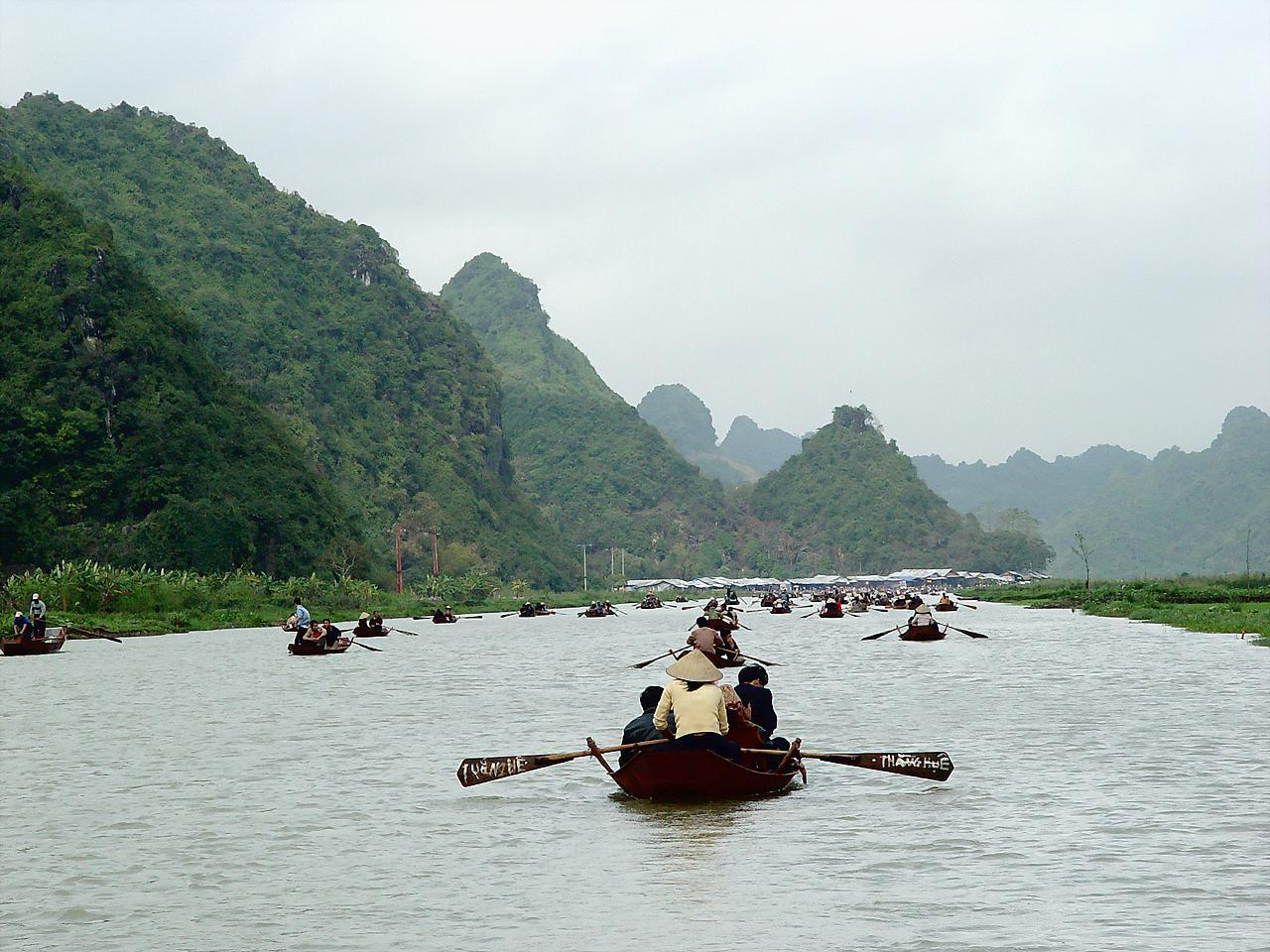
Pilgrim boats on the Yến River

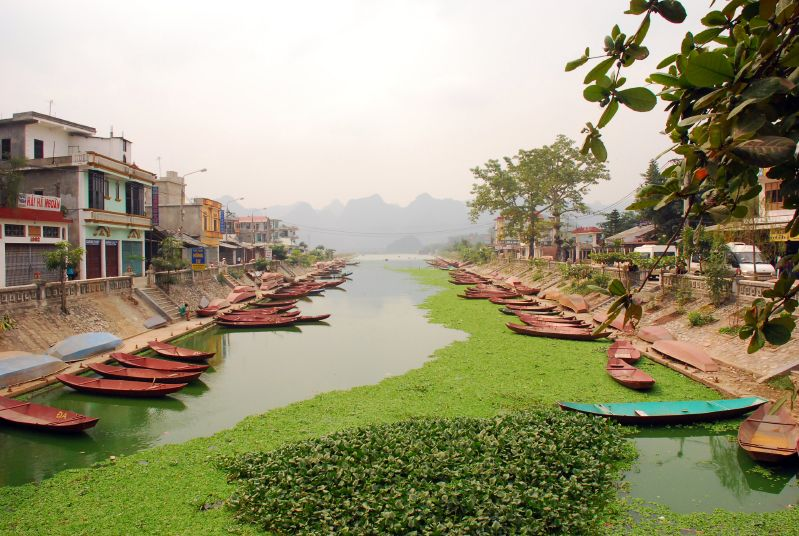
Đục wharf, the starting point of pilgrim boats

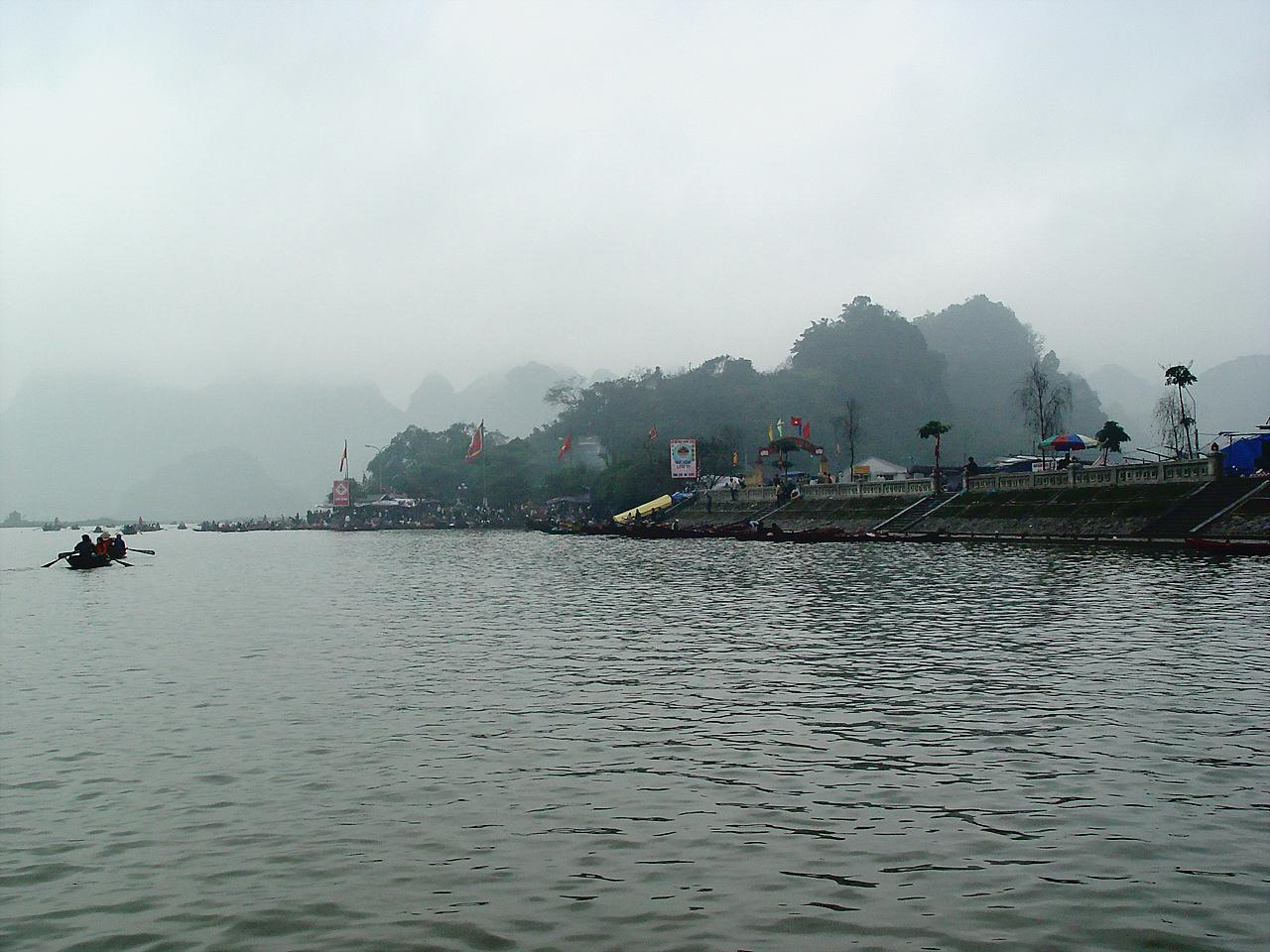
Trình temple and Ngũ Nhạc mountain

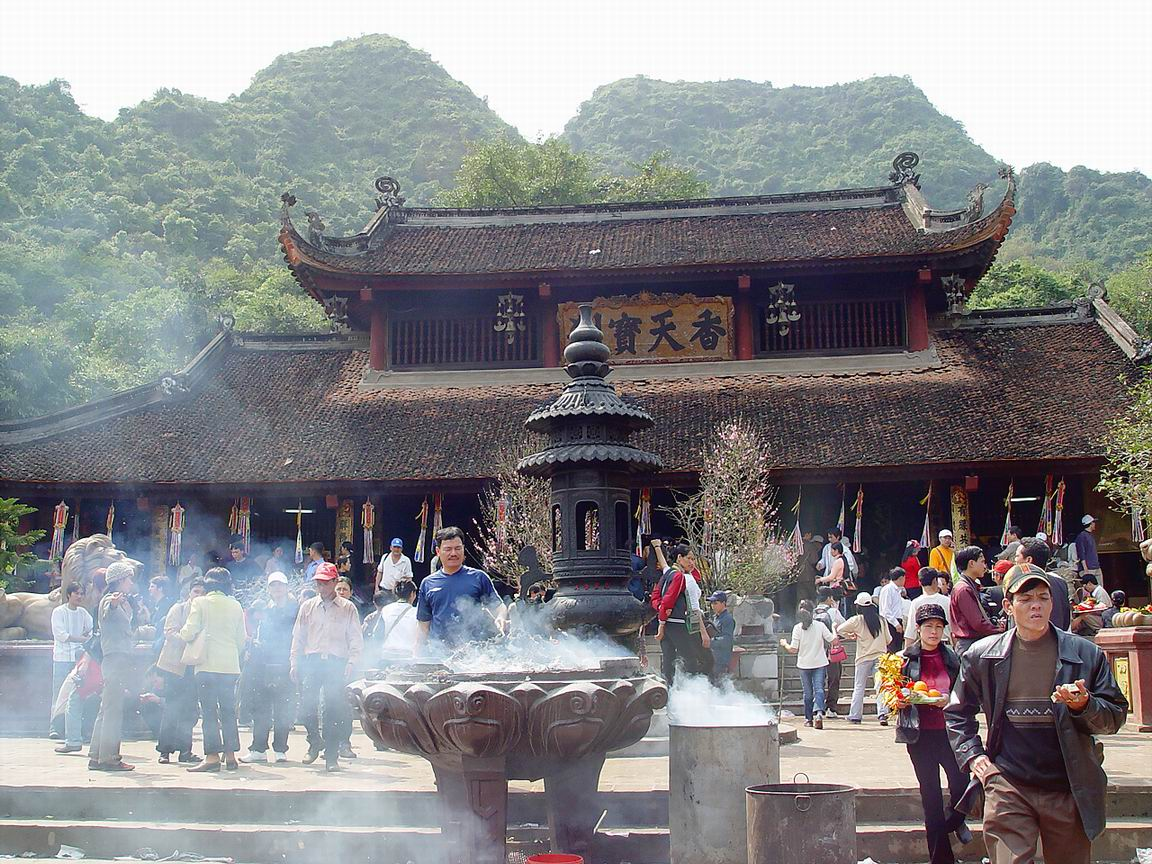
Thiên Trù temple during a Buddhist festival

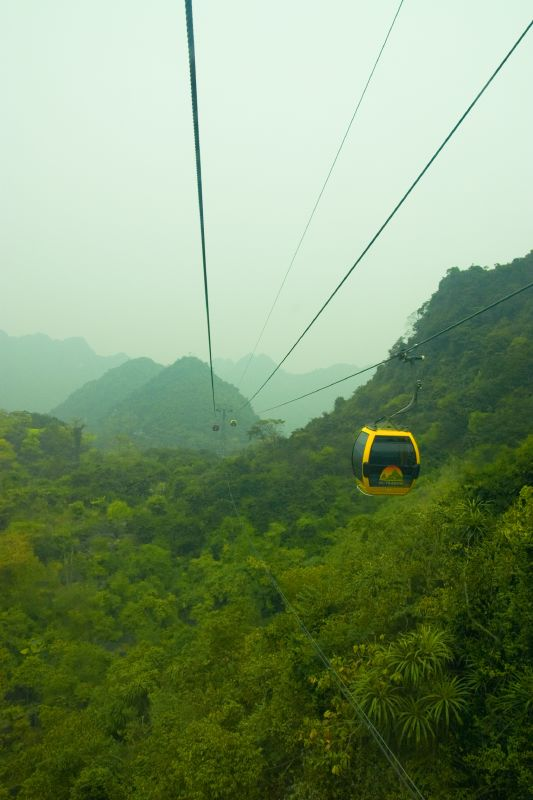
Hương Temple gondola

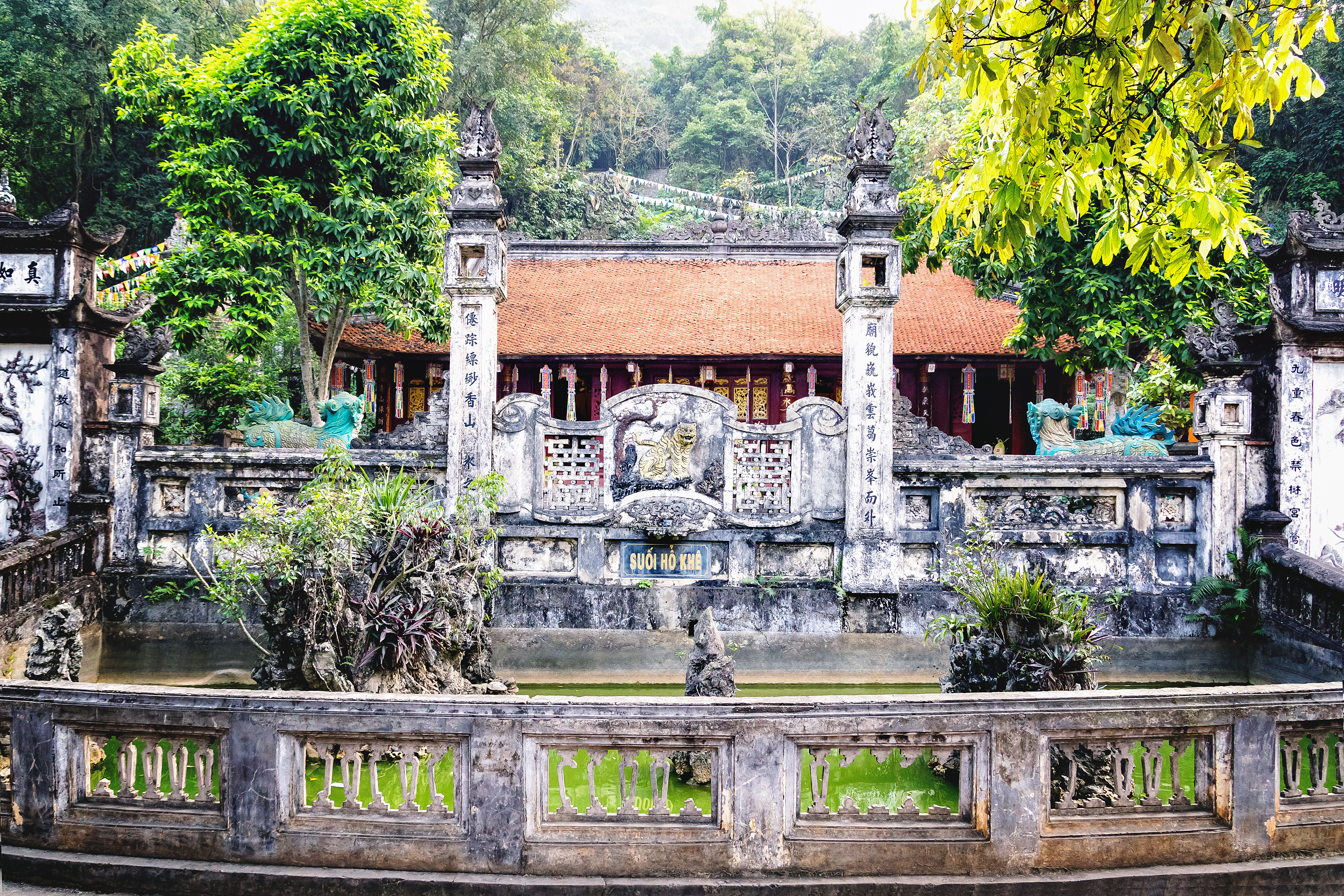
A Buddhist monastery near the Hổ Khê stream

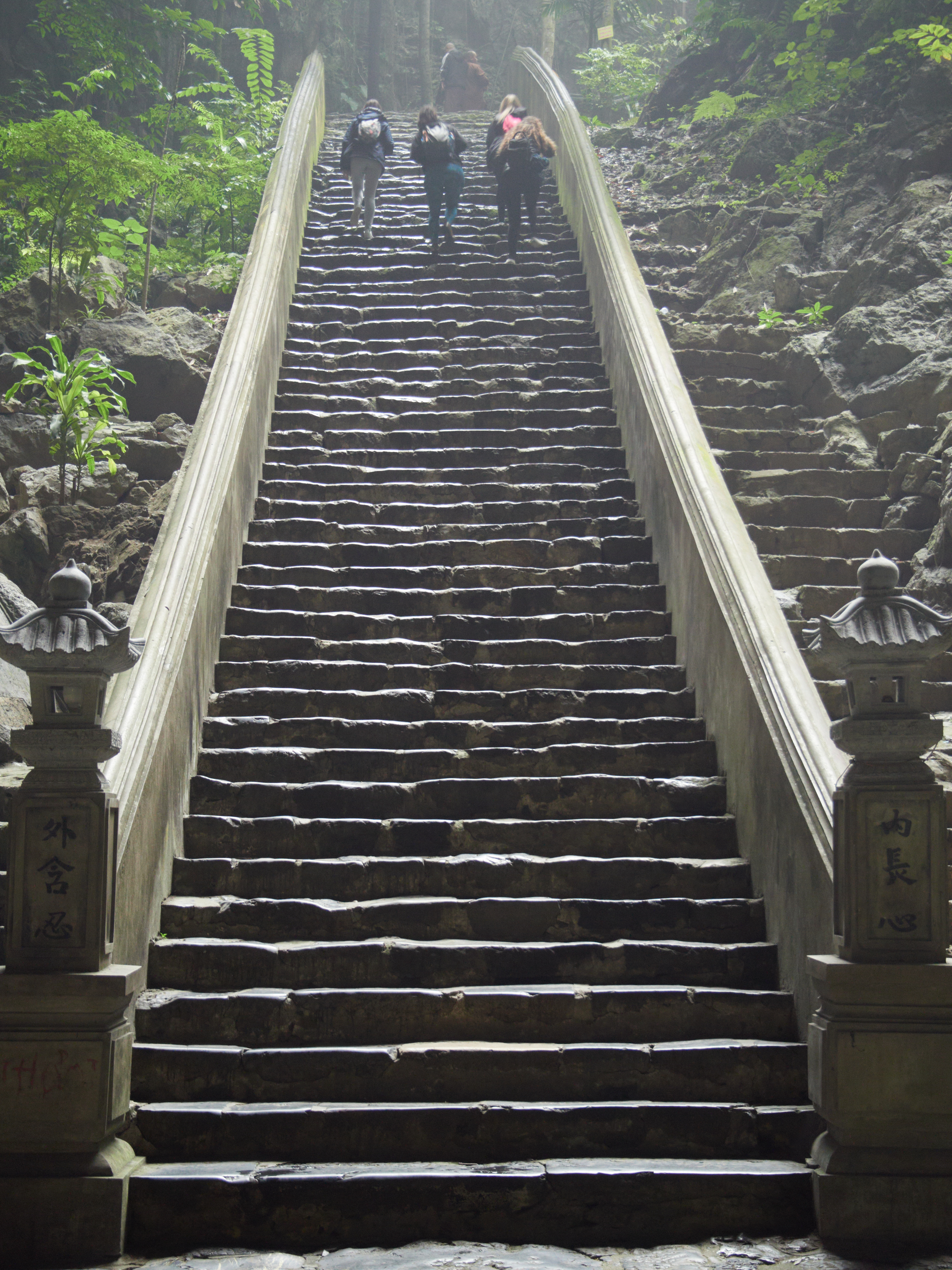
Stairway leading to the Inner Temple

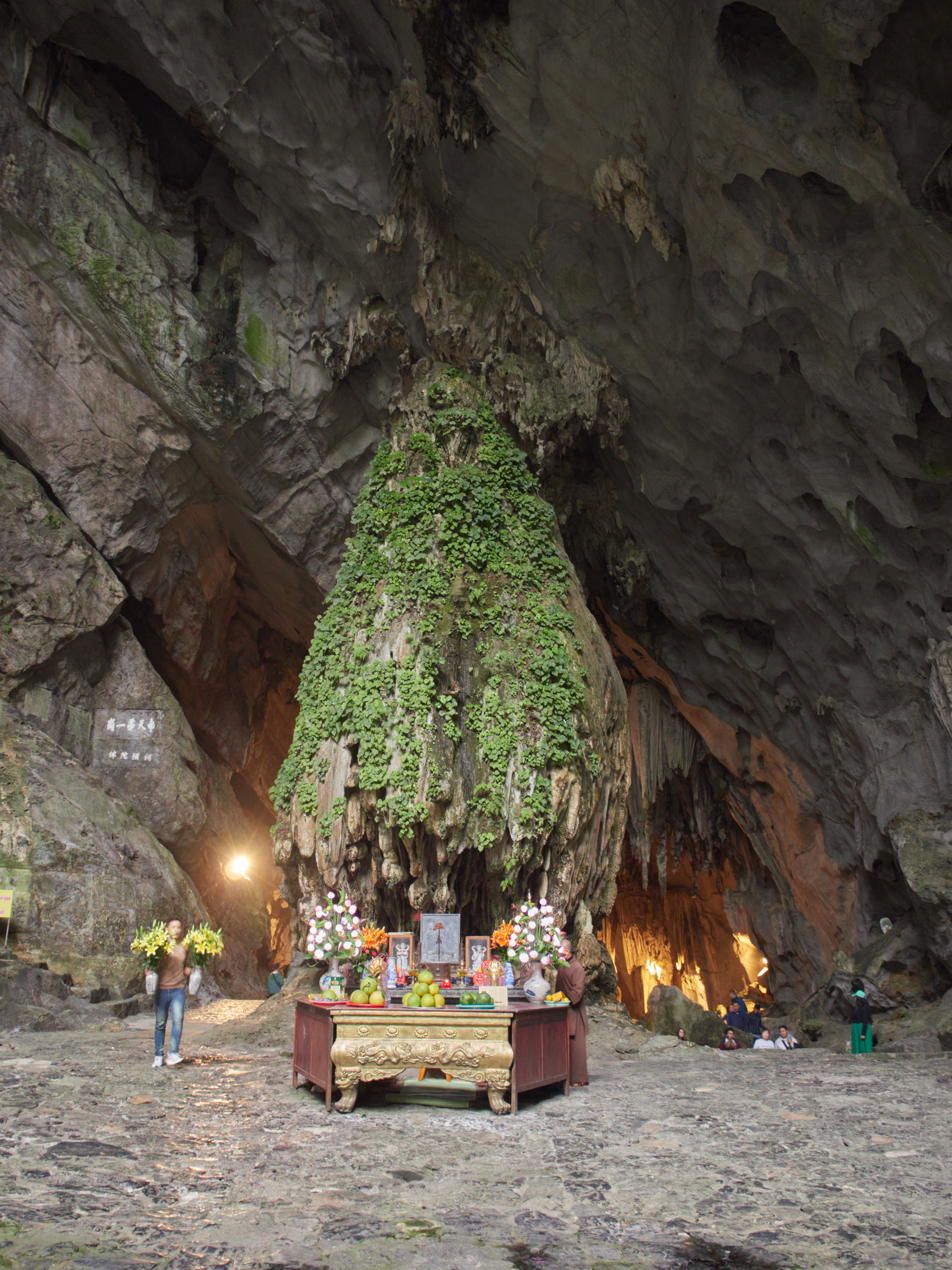
Inner Temple
