= Vietnamese Grand Prix =

Proposed Formula One Grand Prix

- Hanoi Circuit
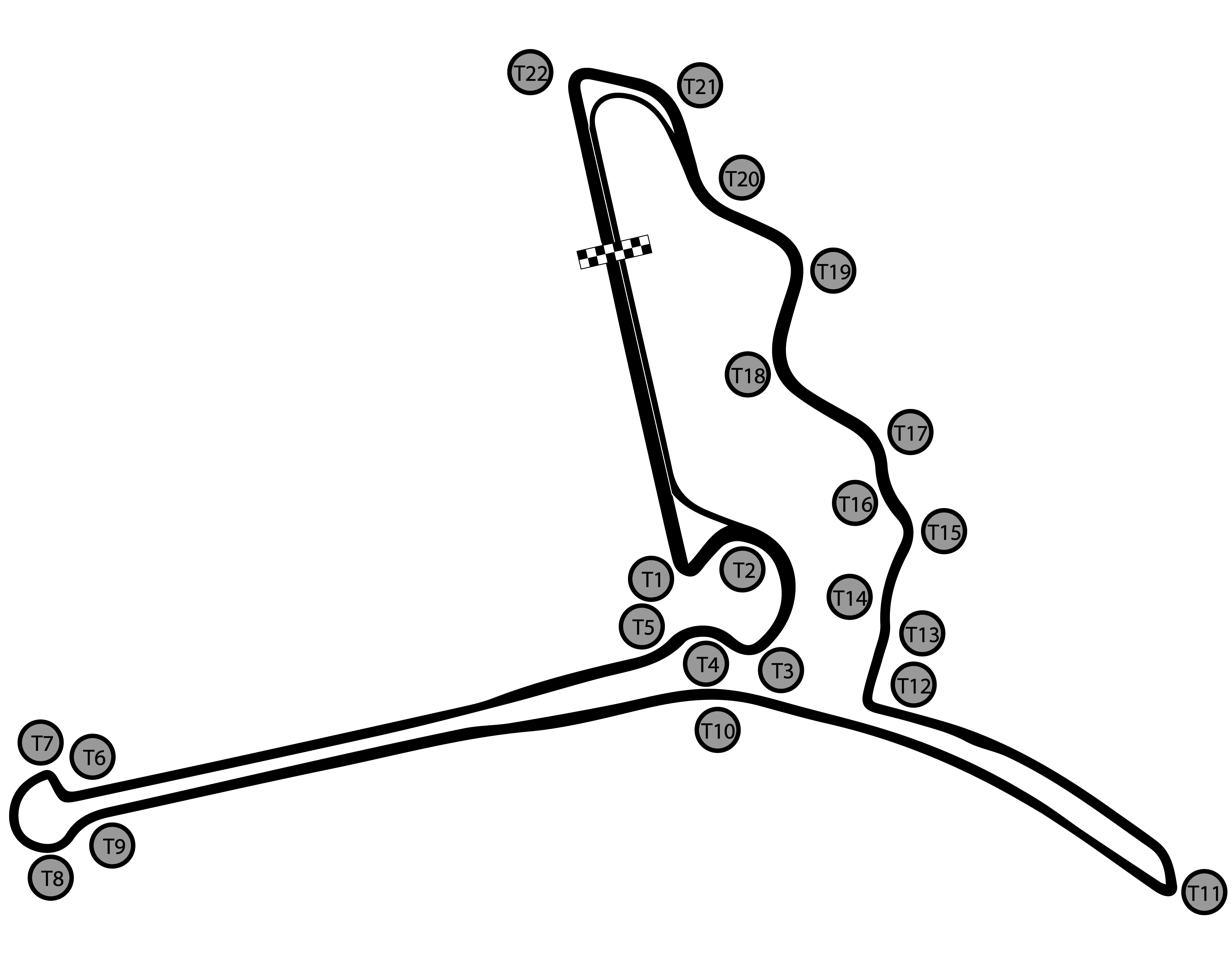

Race information
- Circuit length: 5.613 km (3.488 miles)
- Race length: 308.715 km (191.826 miles)
- Laps: 55

The Vietnamese Grand Prix (Vietnamese: Giải đua xe Công thức 1 Việt Nam, lit. 'The Vietnamese Formula 1 race') was a proposed Formula One Grand Prix that was first due to take place in April 2020. The race was initially postponed and later cancelled due to the COVID-19 pandemic. The Grand Prix was removed from the 2021 calendar because of the arrest of Hanoi People's Committee Chairman Nguyễn Đức Chung on corruption charges unrelated to the Grand Prix that later led to him being sentenced to ten years in prison in 2022; no further updates have been made since on the future of the race.

== History ==
Plans for a race in Vietnam were first explored by former Formula One CEO Bernie Ecclestone, who abandoned the idea as there were already four races in East Asia at the time (the Malaysian, Singapore, Chinese and Japanese Grands Prix). Ecclestone also acknowledged that the failure of the Korean and Indian Grands Prix left him doubtful of the long-term viability of a race in Vietnam.

The idea was revived after Liberty Media purchased the commercial rights to the sport from CVC Capital Partners in January 2017. The Vietnamese Grand Prix was announced in November 2018, becoming the first new race under Liberty Media's ownership. The race would join the existing Grand Prix held in Southeast Asia, the Singapore Grand Prix.

The inaugural Vietnamese Grand Prix was initially scheduled to be held on 5 April 2020 as part of a multi-year contract during the 2020 Formula One season, but was then postponed and later cancelled due to the COVID-19 pandemic. The race was also omitted from the 2021 calendar, published in November 2020, following the arrest, on corruption charges unrelated to the Grand Prix, of Hanoi People's Committee Chairman Nguyễn Đức Chung who was one of the main stakeholders involved with the event. At that time, the Vietnamese Grand Prix's contract to appear on the Formula One calendar was terminated.

As of the 2026 season, the race has not taken place. No official announcement has been made on whether the Vietnamese Grand Prix would debut.

== Circuit ==
Formula One Grand Prix races are intended to be held on a 5.613 km (3.488 mi) temporary street circuit on the streets of Hanoi. The circuit, going counter clockwise, was designed by Hermann Tilke in collaboration with City of Hanoi authorities. The circuit was initially to feature a hybrid of public roads and a purpose-built section which was planned to be opened to the public in the future. An additional corner was later added to the third sector of the circuit by organisers for safety reasons, making a total of 23 turns.
