= 2015 Bình Phước massacre =

Vietnamese crime

- Native name: Vụ án Nguyễn Hải Dương
- Location: 11.4722930°N 106.6147557°E; Minh Hưng commune, Chơn Thành district, Bình Phước province, Vietnam
- Date: July 7, 2015
- Attack type: Mass murder, robbery
- Deaths: 6
- Perpetrators: Nguyễn Hải Dương; Vũ Văn Tiến; Trần Đình Thoại (accomplice)
- Motive: Revenge, robbery

The 2015 Bình Phước massacre (Vietnamese: Vụ thảm sát ở Bình Phước năm 2015) was a mass murder that took place in Vietnam on 7 July 2015, in Bình Phước province. Nguyễn Hải Dương, (Note: In this Vietnamese name, the surname is Nguyễn. In accordance with Vietnamese custom, this person should be referred to by the given name, Dương.) with the help of Vũ Văn Tiến, (Note: In this Vietnamese name, the surname is Vũ. In accordance with Vietnamese custom, this person should be referred to by the given name, Tiến.) murdered six members of a family in their home. The motive was revenge after Dương's relationship with a victim's daughter ended, combined with an intent to rob the family. A third accomplice, Trần Đình Thoại, (Note: In this Vietnamese name, the surname is Trần. In accordance with Vietnamese custom, this person should be referred to by the given name, Thoại.) assisted in planning but did not participate in the killings. Dương and Tiến were sentenced to death and executed in 2017 and 2018, respectively, while Thoại received a 16-year prison sentence.

== Background ==
Nguyễn Hải Dương (born 1991), from An Giang province, had been in a relationship with Lê Thị Ánh Linh, (Note: In this Vietnamese name, the surname is Lê. In accordance with Vietnamese custom, this person should be referred to by the given name, Linh.) the 22-year-old daughter of wealthy timber businessman Lê Văn Mỹ. (Note: In this Vietnamese name, the surname is Lê. In accordance with Vietnamese custom, this person should be referred to by the given name, Mỹ.) The couple dated for over a year, but Linh's mother, Nguyễn Lê Thị Ánh Nga, (Note: In this Vietnamese name, the surname is Nguyễn Lê. In accordance with Vietnamese custom, this person should be referred to by the given name, Ánh Nga.) opposed the relationship due to Dương's modest background. In May 2015, Linh ended the relationship and began dating someone else, which fueled Dương's resentment. Dương, who had previously worked for the family and knew their home layout, planned to kill the family as revenge and to steal their assets. Dương recruited Trần Đình Thoại (born 1988) and later Vũ Văn Tiến (born 1991) for the crime, promising them a share of the stolen goods. Thoại helped purchase weapons but backed out after a failed attempt in June 2015. Tiến joined for the final act. The victims lived in a villa in Minh Hưng commune, which included a timber factory. The family was known for their wealth but modest lifestyle.

== Murders ==
In the early hours of 7 July 2015, Dương and Tiến entered the property through a gate opened by Linh's 14-year-old cousin, Dư Minh Vỹ, (Note: In this Vietnamese name, the surname is Dư. In accordance with Vietnamese custom, this person should be referred to by the given name, Vỹ.) who had been bribed by Dương. They subdued Vỹ, strangled him, and stabbed him to death near the gate. They then broke into the house, restrained the other family members, and demanded money from a safe, which they could not open. The perpetrators systematically killed the victims by strangling them with ropes and stabbing them in the neck multiple times. The only survivor was 18-month-old Lê Thị Gia Linh (Lê Văn Mỹ's youngest daughter), whom Dương spared because he was fond of her. He cradled her back to sleep after the killings. The pair stole electronic devices and cash worth approximately 50 million VND (about US$2,200) but left other valuables untouched. They fled around 4:00 a.m. The bodies were discovered around 7:00 a.m. by a family employee.

== Victims ==
1. Lê Văn Mỹ (nicknamed "Quốc") – owner of the wood workshop, 47 year-old
2. Nguyễn Lê Thị Ánh Nga – Mỹ's wife, 42 year-old
3. Lê Thị Ánh Linh – daughter of Mỹ and Ánh Nga, 22 year-old
4. Lê Quốc Anh – son of Mỹ and Ánh Nga, 15 year-old
5. Dư Ngọc Tố Như – Ánh Nga's niece, 18 year-old
6. Dư Minh Vỹ – Ánh Nga's nephew, 14 year-old

== Investigation and arrests ==
The crime shocked Vietnam, prompting a rapid response from authorities. Minister of Public Security Trần Đại Quang directed a special task force. Investigators collected fingerprints, blood samples, and phone records, leading to Dương within days. Dương was arrested on 10 July 2015 at the victims' funeral after attempting to create an alibi. He confessed and implicated Tiến, who was captured the same day in Hóc Môn district, Ho Chi Minh City. Thoại was arrested on 10 August 2015 after evidence linked him to the planning. A crime scene reenactment was conducted, and the case was prosecuted for murder and robbery under Vietnam's Penal Code.

== Trial ==
The trial began on 17 December 2015 at the People's Court of Bình Phước. Dương and Tiến were convicted of murder and robbery, receiving death sentences for the brutality, killing of children, and multiple victims. Thoại was sentenced to 16 years (13 for murder, 3 for robbery) as an accomplice. Appeals were heard on 18 July 2016 at the High People's Court in Ho Chi Minh City, where the sentences were upheld.

== Executions ==
Nguyễn Hải Dương was executed by lethal injection on 17 November 2017 in Bình Dương province. Vũ Văn Tiến was executed on 20 September 2018 in Bình Phước.
