= Nguyễn Đức Chung =

Vietnamese politician (born 1967) arrested on corruption charges

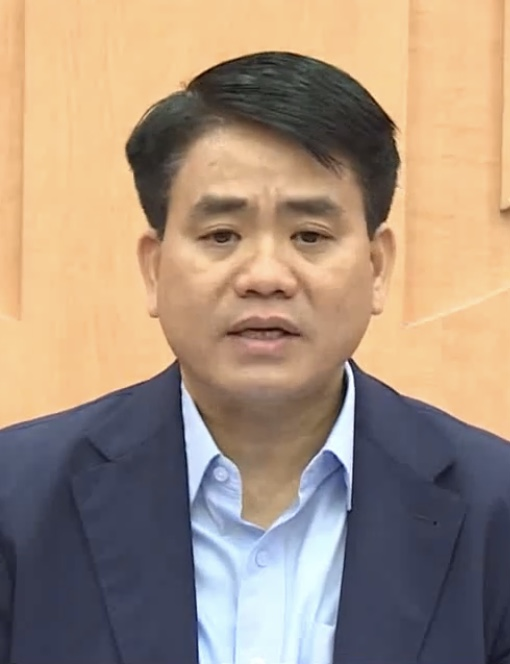
Nguyễn Đức Chung

Nguyễn Đức Chung (born 3 August 1967) is a Vietnamese former army officer and politician. Nguyễn served as Major General in the Vietnam People's Public Security and the chairman of the Hanoi People's Committee. In August 2020, he was prosecuted and detained. He was the Director of Hanoi City Police (2012–2016), a member of the 13th National Assembly of Vietnam (2011–2016), a member of the Hanoi delegation, and member of the 13th session of the National Judiciary Committee.

On 25 September 2020, he was officially dismissed from all positions. On 22 November 2020, the Investigation Agency of the Ministry of Public Security announced that Đức Chung played a master role in the theft of many secret documents about the Nhật Cường case. On 2 December 2020, the Central Inspection Committee announced that it was considering expulsion from the party against Đức Chung.

== Early life and education ==
Đức Chung was born in Hanh Cù, Thanh Ba district, Phú Thọ province. Originally from Thăng Long commune, Kinh Môn town, Hải Dương province, he has an older brother, Major General Nguyễn Tiến Thành, who is also the Deputy Chief Inspector of the Ministry of National Defense.

== Career ==
Đức Chung used to be a member of the Hanoi delegation to the 13th National Assembly of Vietnam (2011–2016), Director of Hanoi City Police (2012–2016), and member of the 13th session of the National Judiciary Committee.

In the Communist Party of Vietnam, he served as a member of the 12th Central Committee and Deputy Secretary of the Hanoi Party Committee.

=== Imprisonment ===
Đức Chung was temporarily suspended from work for 90 days from 11 August 2020 to investigate, verify, and clarify related responsibilities in a number of cases. On 25 September 2020, he was officially dismissed from all positions. Prior to that, his private driver and secretary had both been detained for investigation into the theft of State secrets. On 22 November 2020, the Investigation Agency of the Ministry of Public Security announced that Đức Chung played a master role in the theft of many secret documents about the Nhật Cường case. On 2 December 2020, the Central Inspection Committee announced that it was considering expulsion from the party against Đức Chung.

On the afternoon of December 11, 2020 the People's Court of Hanoi conducted a verdict on the case related to appropriating state secret documents related to the case of Nhat Cuong Company, which belongs to the Central Steering Committee for anti-corruption. The court sentenced Đức Chung to 5 years in jail according to the provisions of the 2015 Penal Code's Article 337. On the afternoon of 13 December 2021, on the crime of abusing positions and powers while on official duty, the Hanoi People's Court sentenced Đức Chung to 8 years in jail on charges of letting the family company buy Redoxy-3C products and sell them for the city.

On 31 December 2021, Đức Chung received an additional 3 years in jail for abusing his position and power while on official duty to create advantages for the Đông Kinh–Nhật Cường joint venture to win the bid. On 13 July 2022, Đức Chung appeared court. He would spend a total of 10 years behind bars. Although his charges were not related to Formula One race, Đức Chung was one of the main supporters associated with the Vietnamese Grand Prix; the Vietnamese Grand Prix was dropped from the calendar in 2021.

== See also ==
- Corruption in Vietnam
