= Đồng Tâm, Mỹ Đức =

Đồng Tâm
- Municipality
- Interactive map of Đồng Tâm
- Country: Vietnam
- Province: Hanoi
- County: Mỹ Đức

Population
  - Total: 8.647/2.572 families

Đồng Tâm is a former commune belonging to Mỹ Đức District, Việt Nam.

== Geography ==
The commune is about 35 km (22 mi) by car to the south west from the center of the capital Hà Nội. It borders Chương Mỹ district to the north, the communes xã Phúc Lâm and Vĩnh Xương to the east, Hòa Bình Province to the west, and commune Thượng Lâm to the south.

The population is about 9.801 people, with 2.771 families. The municipality has two villages, Hoành and Đồng Mít, both together divided into 14 hamlets.

== See also ==
- 2017 Hanoi hostage crisis
