= Mỹ Đức district =

Mỹ Đức district Huyện Mỹ Đức
- District
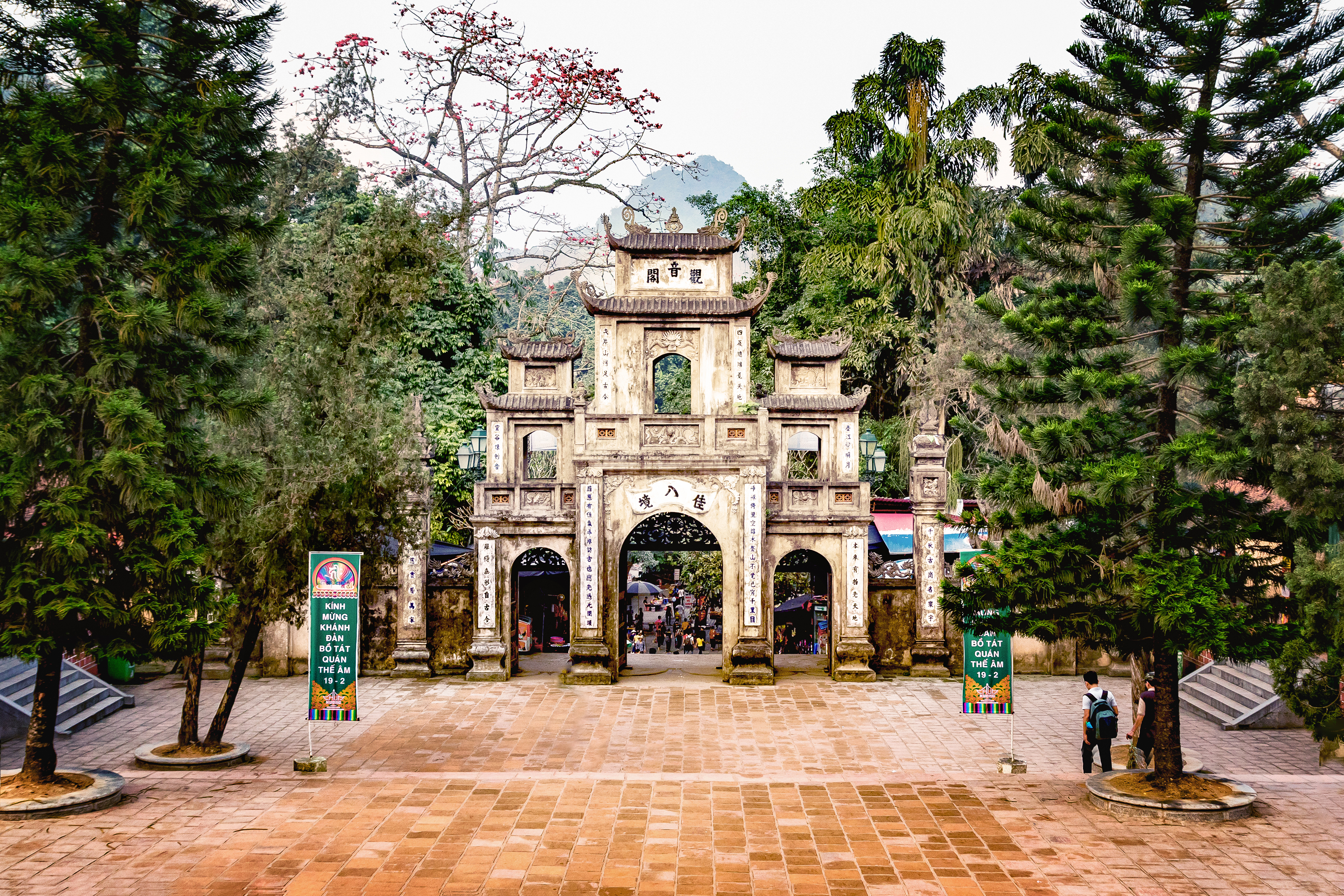
- Hương Temple

- Location within Hanoi
- Coordinates: 20°41′03″N 105°44′33″E
- Country: Vietnam
- Region: Red River Delta
- Municipality: Hanoi
- Capital: Đại Nghĩa
- Time zone: UTC+7 (Indochina Time)

Mỹ Đức is a district (huyện) of Hanoi in the Red River Delta region of Vietnam.

Mỹ Đức district is bordered by Ứng Hòa district to the east, Hòa Bình province to the west, Hà Nam province to the south and Chương Mỹ district to the north.

The district is subdivided to 22 commune-level subdivisions, including the township of Đại Nghĩa and the rural communes of: An Mỹ, An Phú, An Tiến, Bột Xuyên, Đại Hưng, Đốc Tín, Đồng Tâm, Hồng Sơn, Hợp Thanh, Hợp Tiến, Hùng Tiến, Hương Sơn, Lê Thanh, Mỹ Thành, Phù Lưu Tế, Phúc Lâm, Phùng Xá, Thượng Lâm, Tuy Lai, Vạn Kim, Xuy Xá.

== Attraction ==
Hương Temple is a significant Buddhist pilgrimage site located in Hương Sơn Commune, Mỹ Đức District. The complex consists of a series of temples and shrines built into the limestone mountains of Hương Tích. The temple is considered one of the most sacred sites in Vietnamese Buddhism.
