= Điện Bàn (town) =

- District-level town (Class-4)
- Điện Bàn Town; Thị xã Điện Bàn
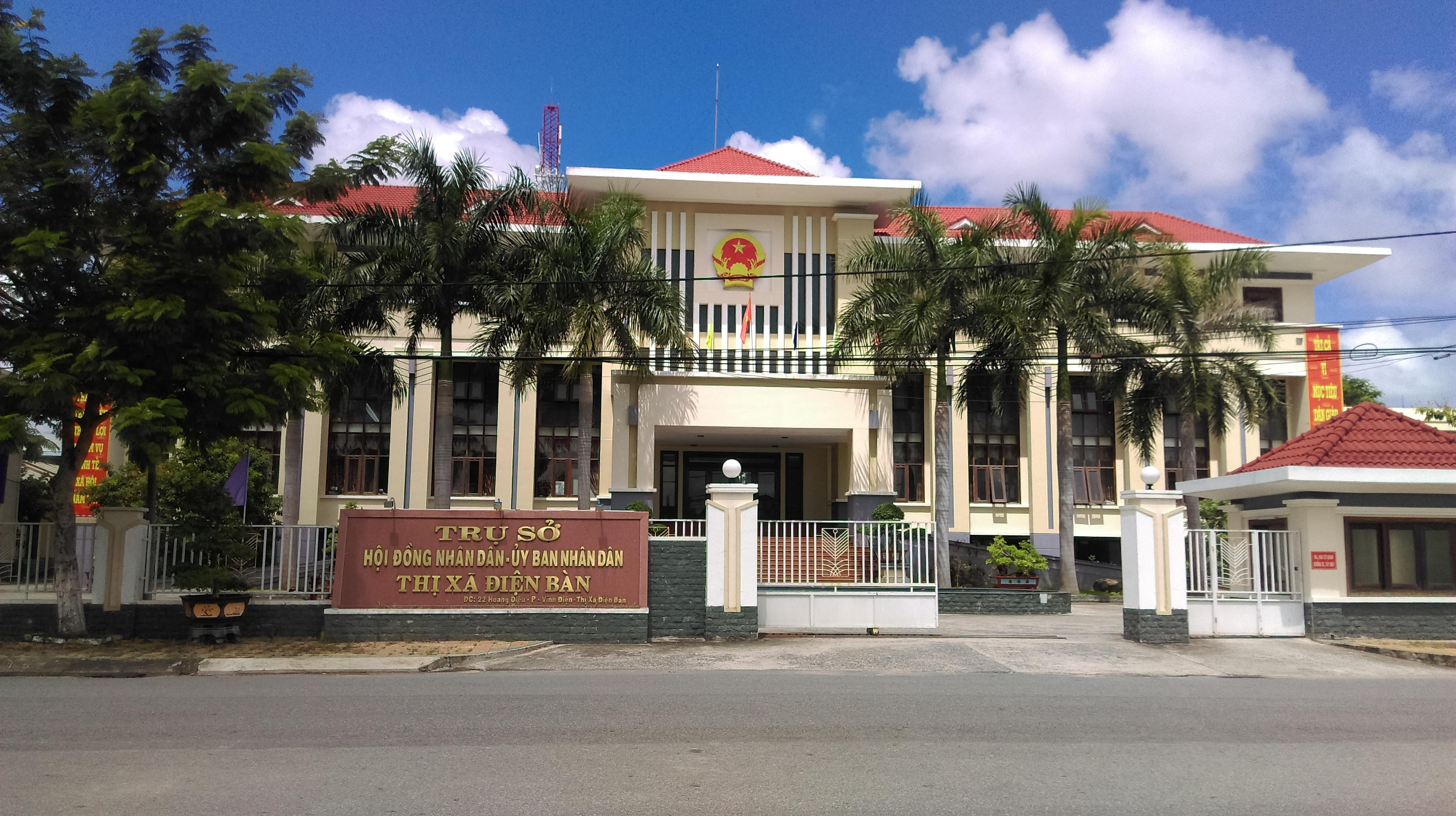
- Governmental House of Điện Bàn

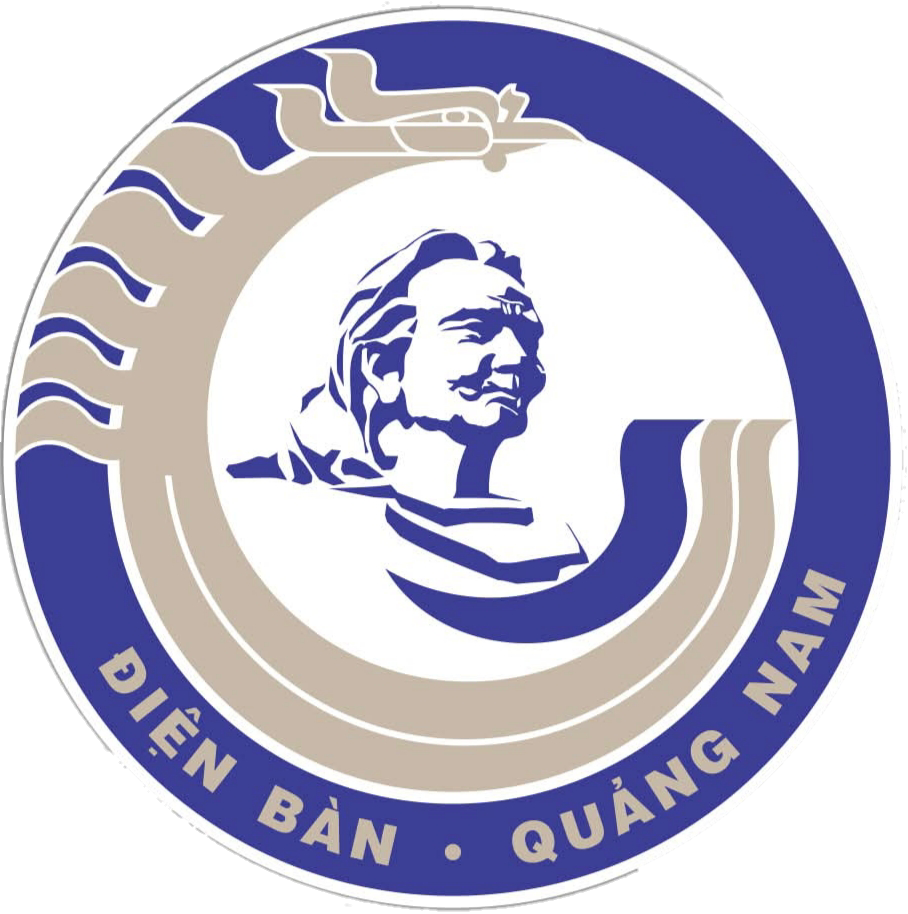
- Seal

- Location within Vietnam Location within Southeast Asia Location within Asia
- Country: Vietnam
- Region: South Central Coast
- Province: Quảng Nam Province
- Capital: Vĩnh Điện

Area
  - District-level town (Class-4): 82.90 sq mi (214.71 km^{2})
  - Urban: 28.4575 sq mi (73.7046 km^{2})

Population (2019)
  - District-level town (Class-4): 251,400
  - Density: 2,773/sq mi (1,070.7/km^{2})
  - Urban: 101,450
  - Urban density: 3,565/sq mi (1,376.4/km^{2})
- Time zone: UTC+7 (Indochina Time)

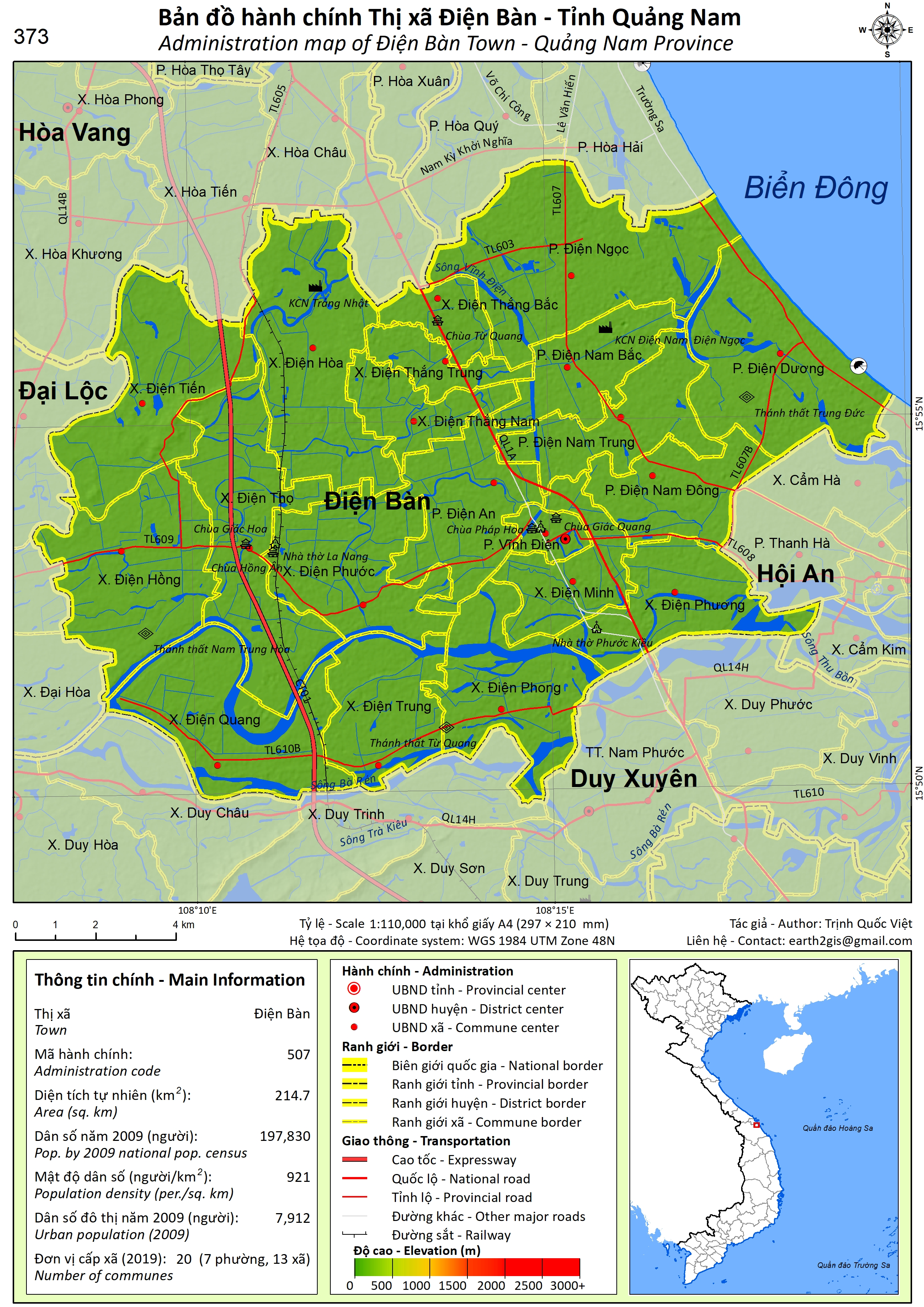
Administration map of Dien Ban District

Điện Bàn is a former district-level town of Quảng Nam Province in the South Central Coast region of Vietnam. As of 2015 the district had a population of 229,907. The district covers an area of 214.71 km^{2} (82.90 sq mi). The district capital lies at Vĩnh Điện.

On March 11, 2015, Điện Bàn Town was established based of Điện Bàn District. Điện Nam - Điện Ngọc Industrial Park is located in Điện Bàn.

There is a historical citadel site in Vĩnh Điện dating back to 1833, as Điện Bàn has served as political, commercial and cultural town.

Điện Bàn is expected to become a city directly under the province (Thành phố Trực thuộc Tỉnh) by 2030.
