= Russian attacks on civilians in the Russo-Ukrainian war (2022–present) =

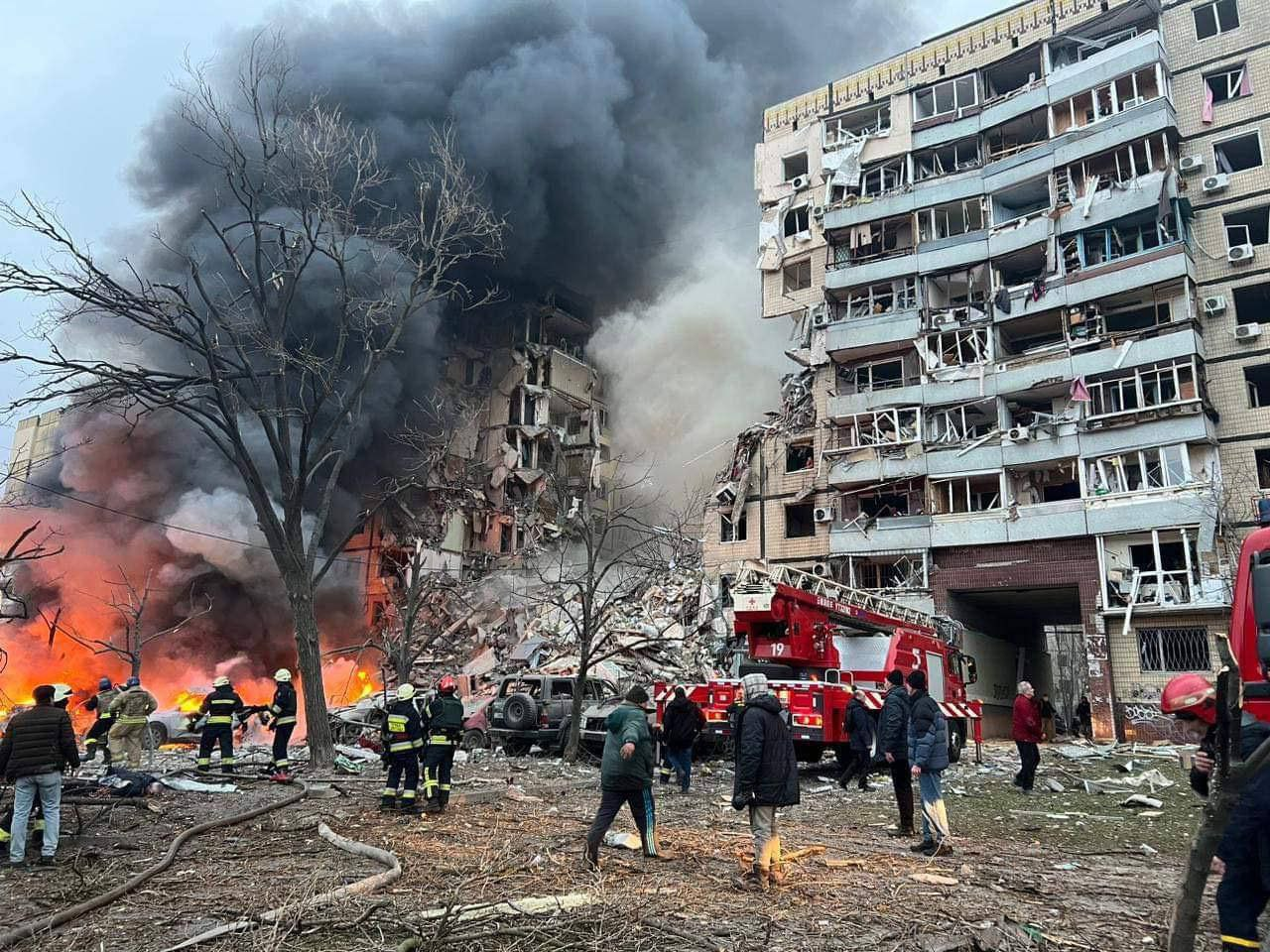
Aftermath of the Russian missile strike on an apartment block in Dnipro (14 January 2023), which killed 46 civilians

Shelling of the Kharkiv Regional Administration

During the Russo-Ukrainian War (2022–present), the Russian military has continuously carried out deliberate attacks against civilian targets and indiscriminate attacks in densely populated areas. The United Nations Human Rights Monitoring Mission in Ukraine says the Russian military exposed the civilian population to unnecessary and disproportionate harm by using cluster bombs and by firing other weapons with wide-area effects into civilian areas, such as missiles, heavy artillery shells, and multiple launch rockets. As of 2026, the attacks had resulted in between the UN-documented 17,000 and an estimated 40,000 dead civilians. On 22 April 2022, the UN reported that of the 2,343 civilian casualties it had been able to document, it could confirm 92.3% of these deaths were as a result of the actions of the Russian armed forces.

On 5 July 2022, the UN High Commissioner for Human Rights (OHCHR), Michelle Bachelet, reported that most civilian casualties documented by her office had been caused by the Russian army's use of explosive weapons with wide-area effects in populated areas, calling it "indisputable." By 30 June 2023, OHCHR assessed that 90.5% of all civilian deaths were caused by such indiscriminate attacks and that 84.2% of them were recorded in Ukrainian-held territory. El País estimated that by March 2023 Russian forces were firing at a rate of between 600,000 and 1.8 million shells per month. By February 2024, Russia had fired between 12 and 17 million artillery shells against Ukraine. By the end of 2023, Russian forces launched about 7,400 missiles and 3,900 Shahed drone strikes against Ukraine, according to Ukrainian military officials. Reports on the use of cluster bombs raised concerns about the high number of civilian casualties and the long-lasting danger of unexploded ordnance. According to the OHCHR, cluster bombs have been used by Russian armed forces and pro-Russian separatists in densely populated areas, resulting in civilian casualties.

The deadliest Russian attacks on civilians during the war have been the Mariupol theatre airstrike and the Bucha massacre, which are estimated to have killed hundreds. Other strikes on civilians with high casualties include the April 2022 Kramatorsk railway station attack (which killed 63); the 2026 Komyshuvakha strike (which killed 72); the 3 March 2022 Chernihiv bombing (which killed 47); the July 2022 Chasiv Yar missile strike (which killed 46), the Zaporizhzhia civilian convoy attack (which killed 32), the 2023 Dnipro residential building airstrike (which killed 46), the 2023 Hroza missile attack (which killed 59), and the 2025 Sumy airstrike (which killed 35 people).

In total, Russia has attacked more than 3,000 health care targets, more than 4000 schools and universities, more than 2.5 million housing units, more than 700 churches.

== Chernihiv Oblast ==
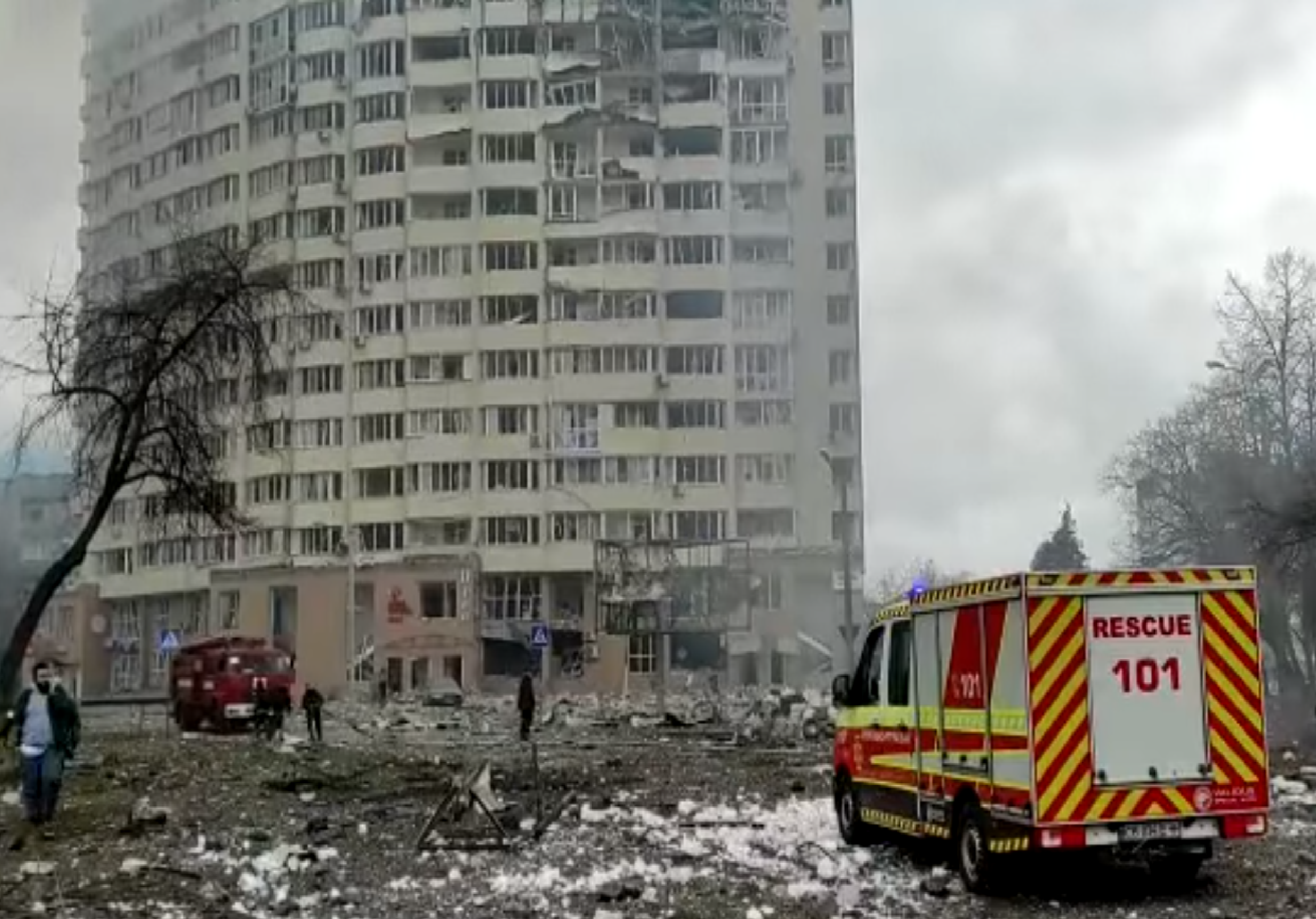
Aftermath of the 3 March Chernihiv bombing

On 3 March 2022, just after 12:00 (UTC+2), six Russian unguided aerial bombs were filmed falling in a residential area in Chernihiv. Analysis by Amnesty International found that (at least) eight bombs fell. Two schools (No. 18 and No. 21) and 8 private houses in the intersection between Viacheslava Chornovila and Kruhova streets (51.5001°N 31.2791°E) were destroyed; 7 more houses were also heavily damaged in the vicinity of Biloruskyi Lane. Local emergency services recorded 38 men and 9 women killed (47 in total) by the bombing and 18 people injured. As Amnesty International was unable to identify a legitimate military target nearby, it said the attack could be a war crime. Human Rights Watch (HRW) found no evidence of a "significant [military] target in or near the intersection when it was hit, ... pointing to a potentially deliberate or reckless, indiscriminate attack. HRW called for an International Criminal Court investigation and a United Nations commission of inquiry to decide if a war crime had occurred and to hold to account the people responsible. The HRW investigation included telephone interviews with three witnesses and two other Chernihiv residents and analysis of 22 videos and 12 photographs. The witnesses interviewed by HRW stated that they were unaware of military targets or operations in the neighbourhood. Matilda Bogner, head of the UN Human Rights Monitoring Mission in Ukraine, stated that the bombing "violated the principles of distinction, of proportionality, the rule on feasible precautions, and the prohibition of indiscriminate attacks." A bomb crater consistent with a 500 kg bomb was found. FAB-500 bombs were known to be used during the invasion.

On 16 March 2022, a Russian attack killed 14 civilians who were waiting in a line for bread in the city. The event was reported by Governor of Chernihiv Oblast Vyacheslav Chaus and the United States Embassy in Kyiv. The incident happened at around 10:00 UTC+3. Victims of the incident were killed following a blast shot from heavy artillery. These civilians were unarmed, and some of them survived the shelling; they were taken to medical facilities by the Chernihiv police. An American citizen was among the dead. Around four hours after the incident, the Chernihiv Regional Prosecutor's Office filed a legal case regarding the attack. The Chernihiv Oblast branch of the Security Service of Ukraine also started an investigation.

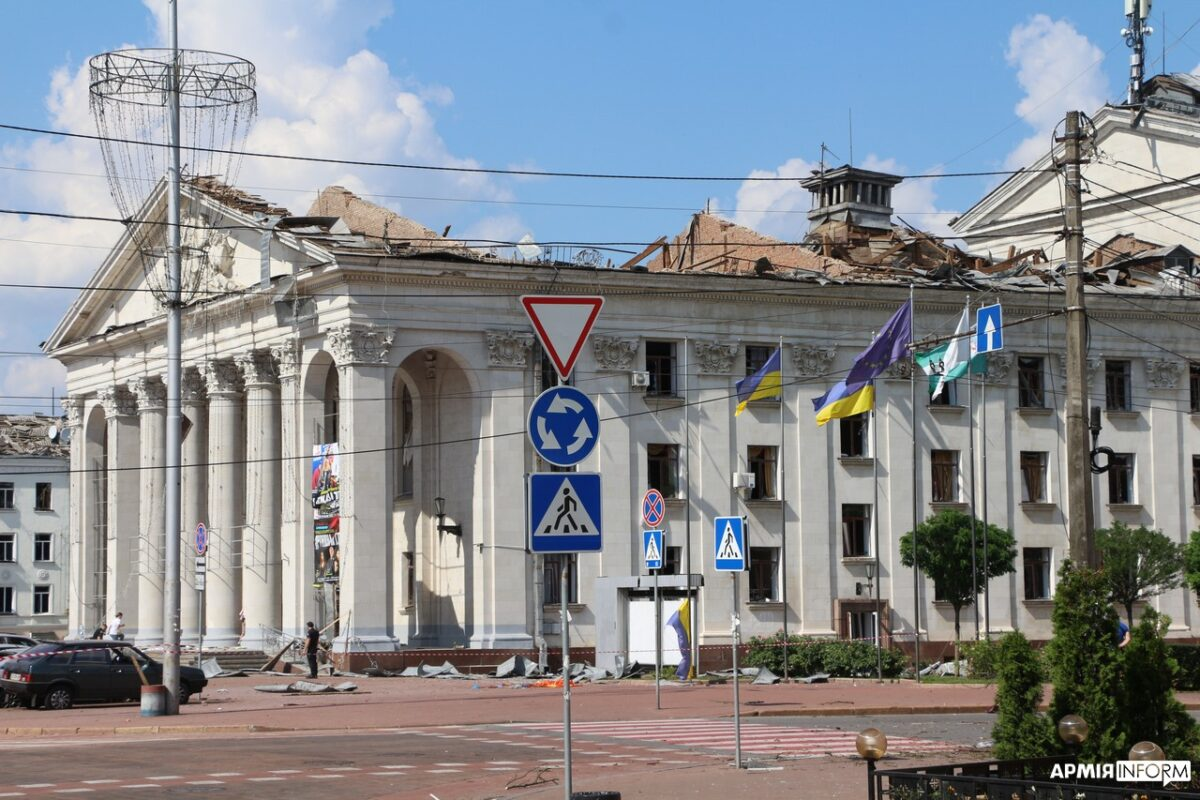
The Drama Theater building after shelling

On 19 August 2023 at about 11:30 Saturday morning, seven civilians were killed, dozens hospitalized, and over 150 injured after Russian Armed Forces launched a 9М727 Iskander cruise missile and hit the Taras Shevchenko Music and Drama Theater at Krasna Square, the city center. The detonator of the warhead of the missile was configured for air detonation, so all the dead and the vast majority of the injured were from outside the drama theater. According to the acting mayor of the city, the military exhibition held in the building was the likely target. Early reporting indicated five people killed and 42 injured, including 11 children presumably among the injured. The estimates went up to 90 injured, including 25 hospitalized, and six dead after a six-year-old child died in the hospital and then seven dead after another woman's body was found.

On 26 December 2025, senators from the US Democratic and Republican parties condemned Russian attacks on Ukrainian civilians gathering to celebrate Christmas, with a Russian drone strike on a multi-story building killing an 80-year-old woman and injuring 10 people, including three children.

On 2 March 2026, an 88-year-old woman was reported to have been killed by Russian drones in Snovsk. On 12 March, the city council of Mena said that a Russian attack damaging two residential buildings resulted in the death of a 15-year-old girl and her parents being injured.

On 17 July 2026, governor Chaus said that Russian drone attacks injured five civilians in the region. Ten days later, the local administration said that a Russian drone had struck an ATB supermarket, killing two people including a child, while injuring 20 people.

On 26 August 2026, the Bazhaiemo Zdorovia pharmacy chain said that one of its pharmacy assistants and her four-year-old daughter had been killed in a Russian attack on Chernihiv during the morning.

On 29 October 2026, Chaus said that two 15-year old girls were killed and at least 25 others, including four children, were wounded when a Russian missile struck the center of Chernihiv.

== Dnipropetrovsk Oblast ==
On 7 April 2022, there were three strikes on the oblast during the day. Russian forces struck Synelnykove and Kryvyi Rih raions. About four people died and seven were injured. Two civilians also went missing.

=== Dnipro strikes ===
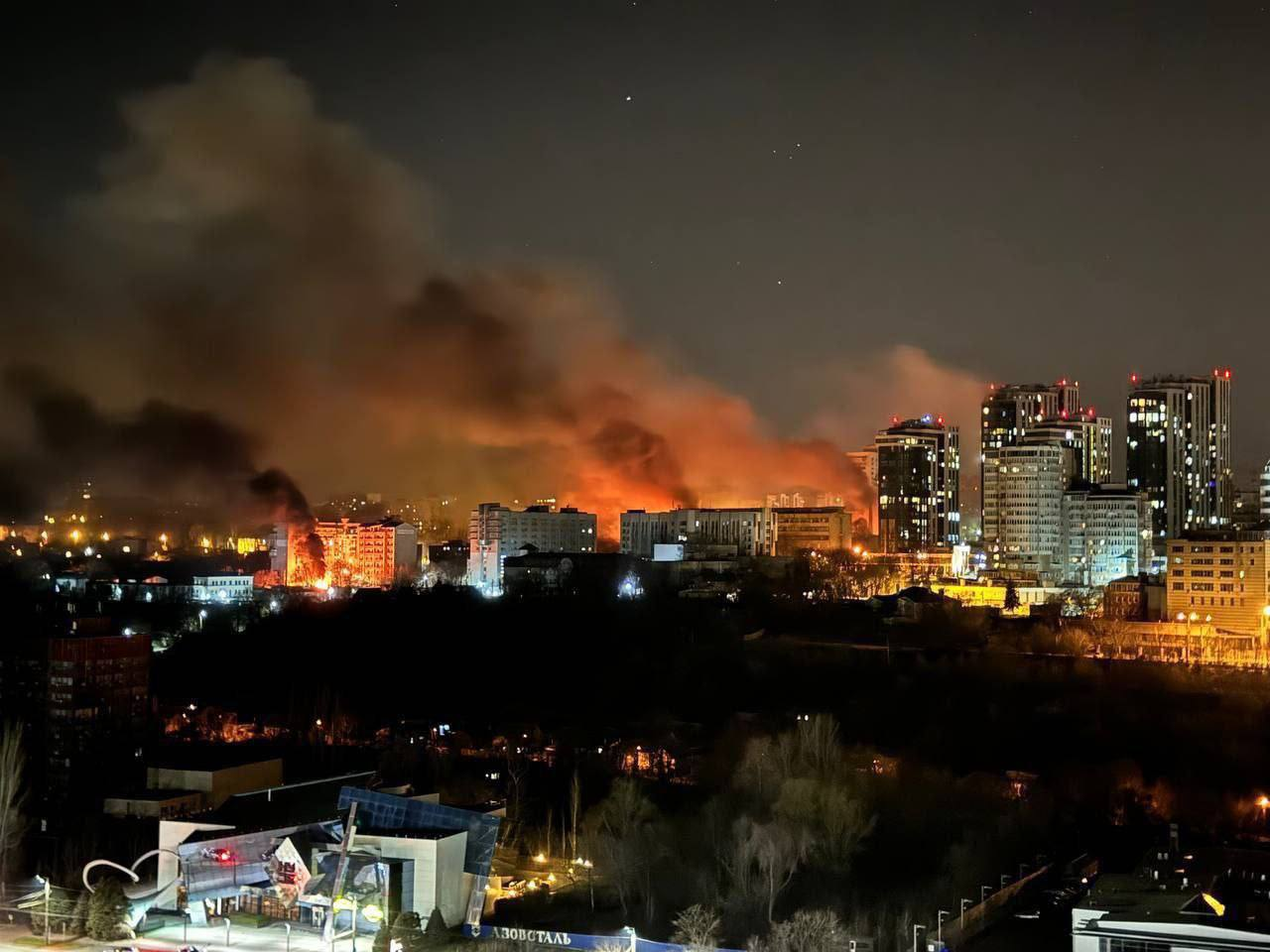
Dnipro during a Russian air attack on 26 March 2025

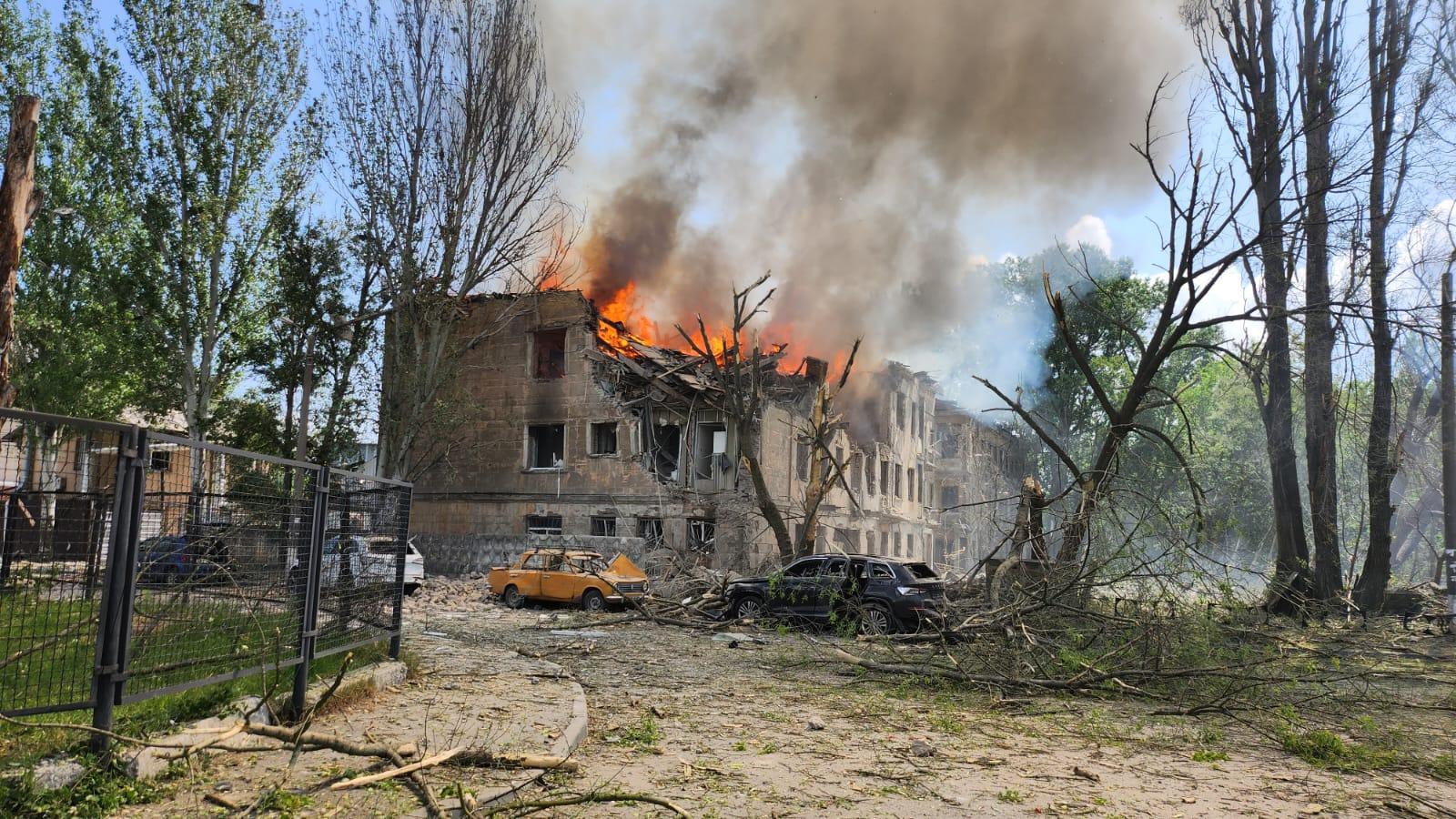
Hospital in Dnipro after Russian missile attack on 26 May 2023. A neighboring veterinary clinic was also destroyed.

On 11 March 2022, three missiles hit the city and killed one person, striking close to an apartment building and a kindergarten. On 28 June, Russian forces fired six 3M-14E Kalibr cruise missiles from the Black Sea to Dnipro at around 5:30 local time. One of them hit an Avtodiesel car repair shop, killing a man and a woman. Seven other people, including a six-year-old boy, were injured. Fragments of the Kalibr missile were found afterwards.

On the morning of 29 September 2022, missiles hit residential areas in Dnipro, and three people were killed. The central bus station was also hit. Dnipro was also hit during the 10 October 2022 Russian missile strikes. It was hit by at least five missiles. During the attack that took place during morning rush hour, three civilians were killed.

On 18 October 2022, Russian missiles hit energy infrastructure in Dnipro. One man was injured, and a large-scale fire broke out at an energy facility that was severely damaged; more than three dozen residential buildings were damaged, including schools and kindergartens. On 25 October 2022, two people were killed, including a pregnant woman, and four were injured due to a fire at a gas station after fragments of a Russian missile hit it.

On 26 November 2022, around noon, a Russian missile strike on Dnipro injured 13 people and partially destroyed seven private houses in Dnipro's Amur-Nyzhnodniprovskyi District. Dnipro mayor Borys Filatov reported that city communications and infrastructure were not damaged. Governor Valentyn Reznichenko stated that due to the attack, one woman was hospitalised in critical condition. The following day Reznichenko reported that a man was found dead under the rubble. Another Russian missile strike destroyed an enterprise on the night of 29 November 2022; no casualties were reported.

On 28 July 2025, a Russian missile strike on Kamianske damaged multiple buildings, including a maternity hospital. Two civilians were killed and five were wounded, including two women critically, one of them pregnant.

On 29 April 2025, regional governor Lysak said that Russia had launched a mass drone attack on Dnipro using Shahed drones, setting several homes on fire and killing one 53-year-old man.

On 24 March 2026, the head of the Dnipropetrovsk Oblast Military Administration, Oleksandr Hanzha, said that nine people had been injured by a Russian drone striking a 14-storey building in Dnipro, including an 18-month-old boy.

On 14 April 2026, Hanzha said that a Russian attack during the morning on the central Dnipropetrovsk region killed five people and wounded 27. On 23 April, Hanzha reported another attack, with Russian drones killing two people and wounding 10, with two young girls aged nine and 14 being among the wounded as the attack damaged infrastructure, including a 13-story residential building.

On 17 July 2026, Hanzha said that 73-year-old man had been injured in a Russian attack.

On 1 August 2026, the Dnipropetrovsk Oblast Prosecutor's Office said that two people were killed and 12 injured in Russian attacks, which included an FPV drone striking a passenger bus.

On 5 September 2026, Hanzha reported Russian attacks across six districts, resulting in one person being killed and five wounded.

==== Dnipro apartment block strike ====
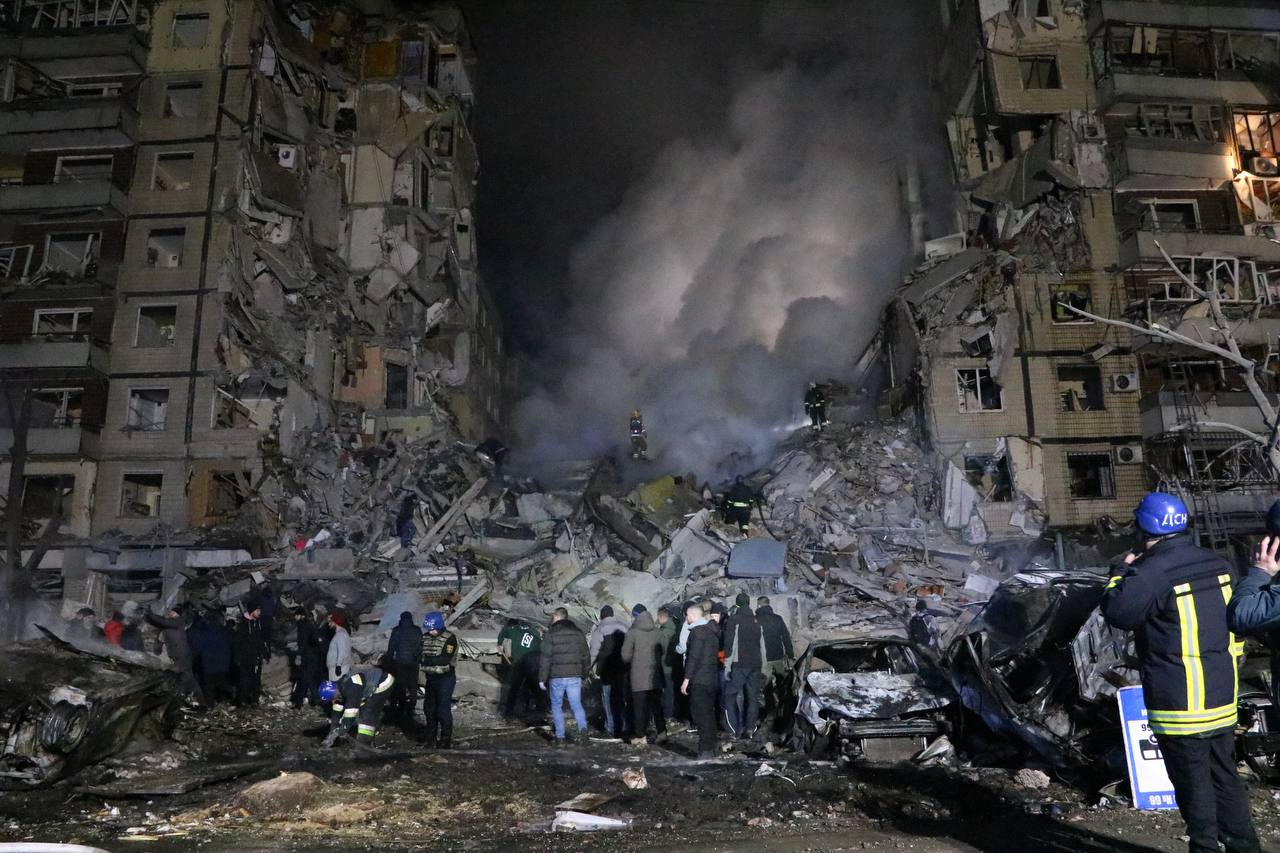
Aftermath of the missile strike on a Dnipro apartment block, January 2023

On 14 January 2023 at about 3:30 p.m., a Russian Kh-22 type missile hit a nine-story residential building in Dnipro on Naberezhna Peremohy St, Sobornyi District in the right-bank part of the city, destroying one entrance and 236 apartments. On 19 January, the official casualty rate was stated as 46 people killed, 80 injured (12 in critical condition), and 11 people reported missing. 14 children were reported among the injured, and 39 inhabitants were rescued. The destruction left about 400 people homeless. This strike became the most destructive Russian attack on a residential building in Ukraine in the last six months. A three-day period of mourning was declared in Dnipro.

==== February 2026 drone strike on bus carrying mineworkers ====
On 1 February 2026, a Russian drone struck a bus carrying mineworkers, killing at least a dozen people and injuring several others, according to Ukrainian emergency services. Ukrainian Energy Minister Denys Shmyhal called the attack a "cynical and targeted attack on energy sector workers." DTEK, the company that owns the bus, accused Russia of also carrying out a "large-scale terrorist attack" on its mines.

==== June 2026 bombardment ====
On 27 June 2026, Dnipropetrovsk's regional head Oleksandr Ganja said two districts in the region had been attack ″more than 30 times with drones and aerial bombs″, killing one person.

==== August 2026 attack killing three-month-old ====
On 15 August 2026, Hanzha said that Russian attack drones struck a residential building in Marhanets, killing a three-month-old boy and injuring 11 people, seven being hospitalized in severe condition. Among the injured were also two children, a five-year-old boy and 12-year-old girl.

==== October 2026 drone attack on crowded railway station platform ====
On 29 October 2026, regional officials reported that a Russian drone had struck a crowded railway station platform in Dnipro, killing 14 people and injuring 14 more, including an 11-year-old boy.

=== Kryvyi Rih missile strikes ===
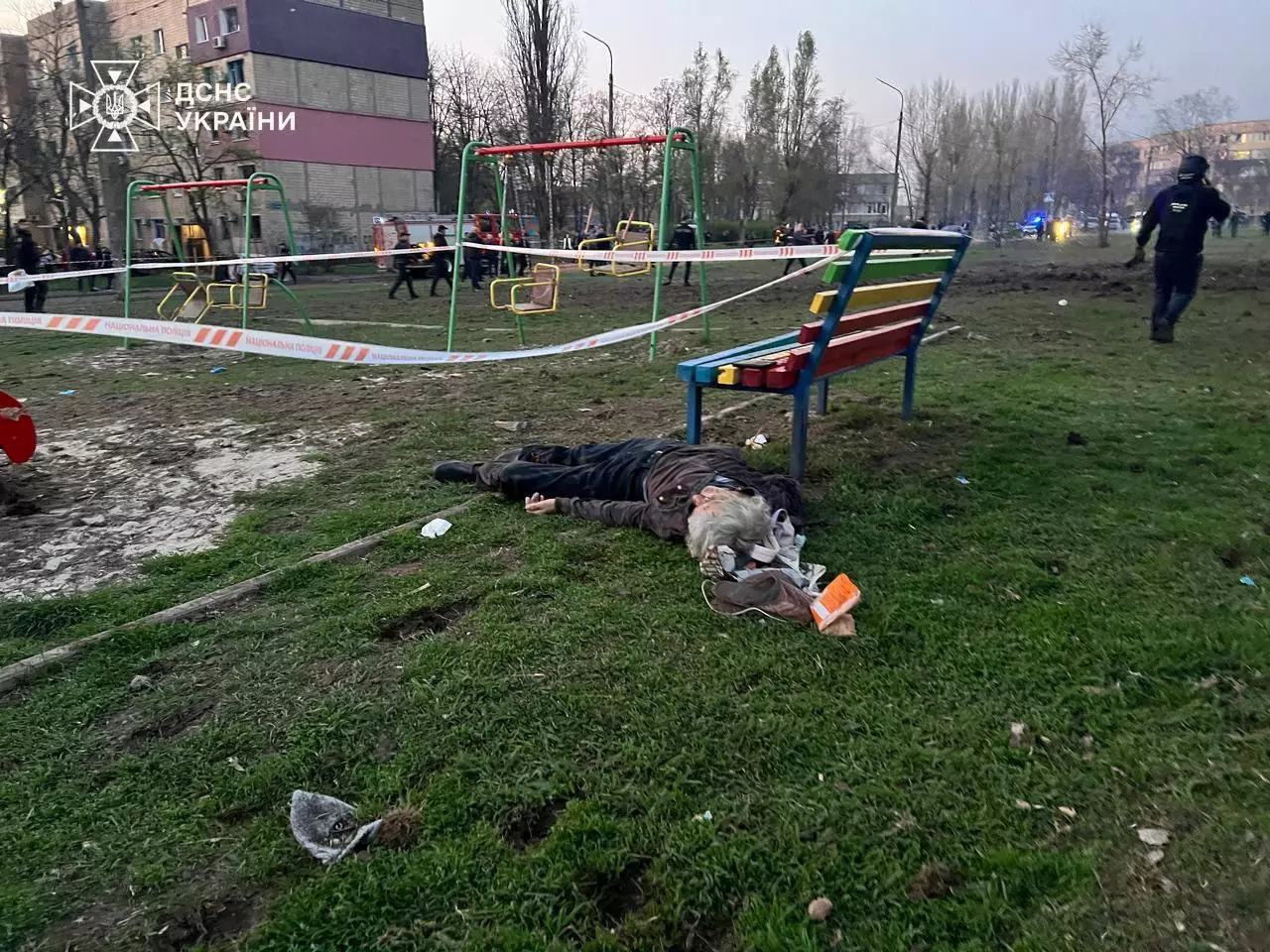
Aftermath of Russian missile attack on Kryvyi Rih on 4 April 2025, which killed 20 people, including nine children

Russian missiles struck residential buildings in the southern central city of Kryvyi Rih, Ukrainian President Volodymyr Zelenskyy's hometown, several times. On 13 June 2023, Russian cruise missiles struck an apartment block and civilian warehouses in Kryvyi Rih, killing thirteen people. On 31 July 2023, a Russian missile struck an apartment block in Kryvyi Rih, killing at least six civilians, including a 10-year-old girl and her mother.

On 28 August 2024, local authorities said that Kryvyi Rih was struck by a Russian missile, which hit civilian infrastructure. Eight people were reported to have been wounded by the attack. As it was struck, Kryvyi Rih was observing an official day of mourning for an attack the previous day that had killed four civilians in a hotel.

On 28 October 2024, a Russian missile struck a residential building in Kryvyi Rih, killing one person and wounding at least 11.

On 6 December 2024, two people were killed by a Russian missile strike on an administrative building. Emergency services added that residential houses had also been damaged and 19 people, including a child, had been injured in the attack.

On 12 March 2025, Dnipropetrovsk regional governor Serhiy Lysak said that a Russian missile attack killed a woman and injured at least nine others, the attack also damaging several buildings, including an educational facility and high-rise apartments.

On 2 April 2025, Ukrainska Pravda reported that Russia had struck Kryvyi Rih with a ballistic missile. The attack damaged multi-story residential buildings, a gym, and an administrative building. According to the local military administration, four people were killed and 14 were injured, including two children.

On 4 April 2025, Russia struck a dense residential area with a missile, spraying shrapnel which also hit a playground. The attack killed 20 people, 11 adults and nine children, and dozens of people were injured. According to Reuters, the strike, described as one of the deadliest attacks on civilians in months, jeopardised the US's push for a ceasefire in the war. The United Nations called the strike Russia's deadliest attack on Ukrainian children in the three years since the invasion started.

In January 2026, the head of the Kryvyi Rih Defense Council, Oleksandr Vilkul, said that a combined Russian missile and drone attack had struck a residential area, injuring 17 people, including three children and eight women.

On 30 July 2026, Ukrainian officials said that a Russian missile attack destroyed a residential house in Radushne, killing five members of the same family, both parents and three of their children, while two children survived and were pulled from the rubble. A total of two homes were reported destroyed in the attack, with eight people also being injured, including an 84-year-old woman.

==== August 2026 Kryvyi Rih shopping center double-tap strike ====
On 21 August 2026, Ukrainian officials said that a Russian double-tap drone strike on a shopping center killed 16 people while injuring 130, including 23 children. Officials said that a second drone deliberately hit as emergency workers responded to the scene, with Zelenskyy calling the attack a ″terrorist act″.

==== October 2026 strike ====
On 26 October 2026, Hanzha said that a Russian drone strike on Pavlohrad had killed one person and injured 10, three of the injuries being serious.

=== Chaplyne railway station strike ===
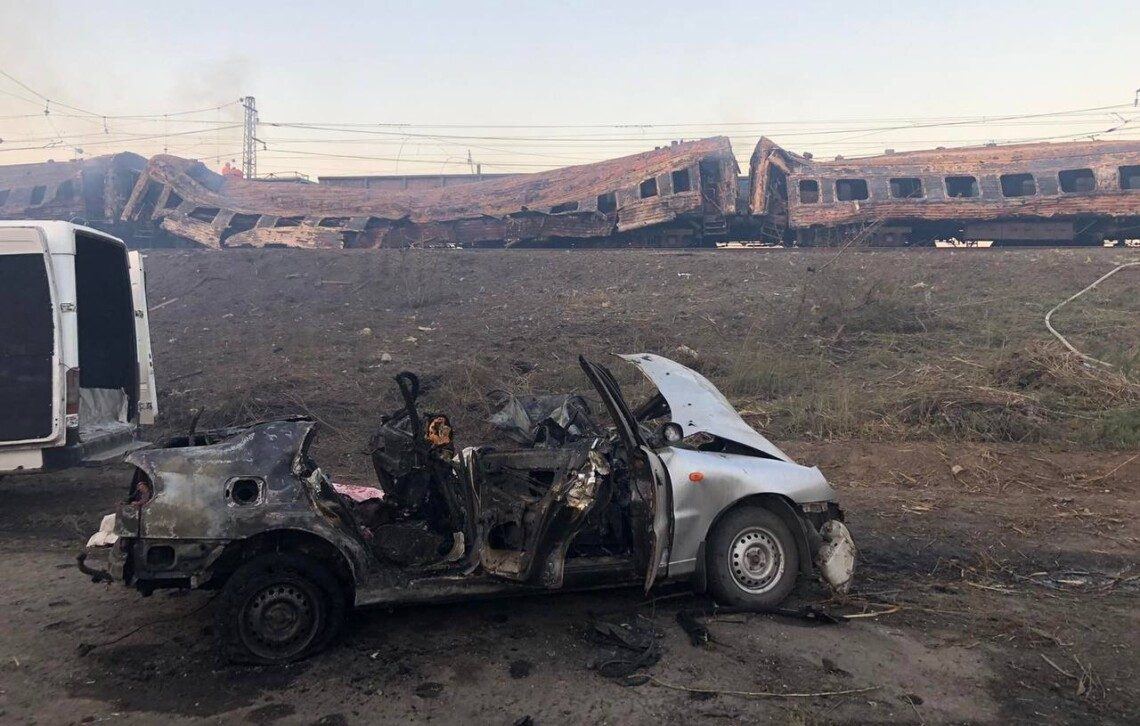
Aftermath of the Chaplyne railway station strike

On 24 August 2022, the Independence Day of Ukraine, Russian forces struck Chaplyne, damaging a railway station, a utility building, and a residential neighborhood. Several passenger rail cars were set on fire and destroyed. Ukrainian sources described multiple rockets or missiles being used in several attacks. At least 25 people (including 2 children) died and about 31 were injured. The Russian defense ministry claimed it had targeted a military train using a single Iskander missile and that the attack had killed 200 Ukrainian soldiers. According to an Associated Press reporter on site, there was no visible indication that Ukrainian soldiers were among the victims. International legal experts said that the attack might qualify as a war crime if civilians were the target.

=== Attacks on civilian transport ===
On 16 September 2026, ABC News reported that a Russian drone striking a passenger bus had killed five people and wounded at least seven in Nikopol.

== Donetsk Oblast ==
There were at least 7,395 civilian casualties (of which 3,511 were killed) in the government-controlled territory of Donetsk and Luhansk oblasts and 2,035 civilian casualties (of which 467 were killed) in the territory controlled by the Russian forces and affiliated groups between February and November 2022. The months-long siege of Mariupol caused a large number of civilian casualties, and a few other attacks with many civilian casualties occurred in the oblast. Donetsk itself experienced several attacks with civilian casualties, including the shelling of a market and the mayor's office. Pro-Russian officials blamed Ukraine for the attacks, while Ukraine blamed Russia or did not comment on the attacks.

On 8 August 2022, the UK Ministry of Defence issued a statement accusing Russia of using anti-personnel PFM-1 scatterable anti-personnel mines along the defensive lines in Donbas, adding that such mines are indiscriminate and pose a threat to civilians.

=== Vuhledar cluster bomb attack ===
On 24 February 2022, 10:30 (UTC), Vuhledar was attacked with a 9M79 Tochka missile, which landed next to a hospital and killed four civilians and injured ten. Amnesty International described it as "irrefutable evidence of violations of international humanitarian law and international human rights law" by Russian forces. Human Rights Watch (HRW) found that the Vuhledar hospital attack used a 9N123 cluster munition. The 9N123 contains fifty 9N24 individual submunitions, which each split into 316 bomblets. HRW based its analysis on contacts with the hospital and municipal administrations and multiple pieces of photographic evidence. HRW called for Russian forces to stop making "unlawful attacks with weapons that indiscriminately kill and maim". The press secretary of the Russian Federation, Dmitry Peskov, denied Russian involvement, saying that this type of ammunition is used by the Armed Forces of Ukraine.

=== Lyman cluster bomb attack ===
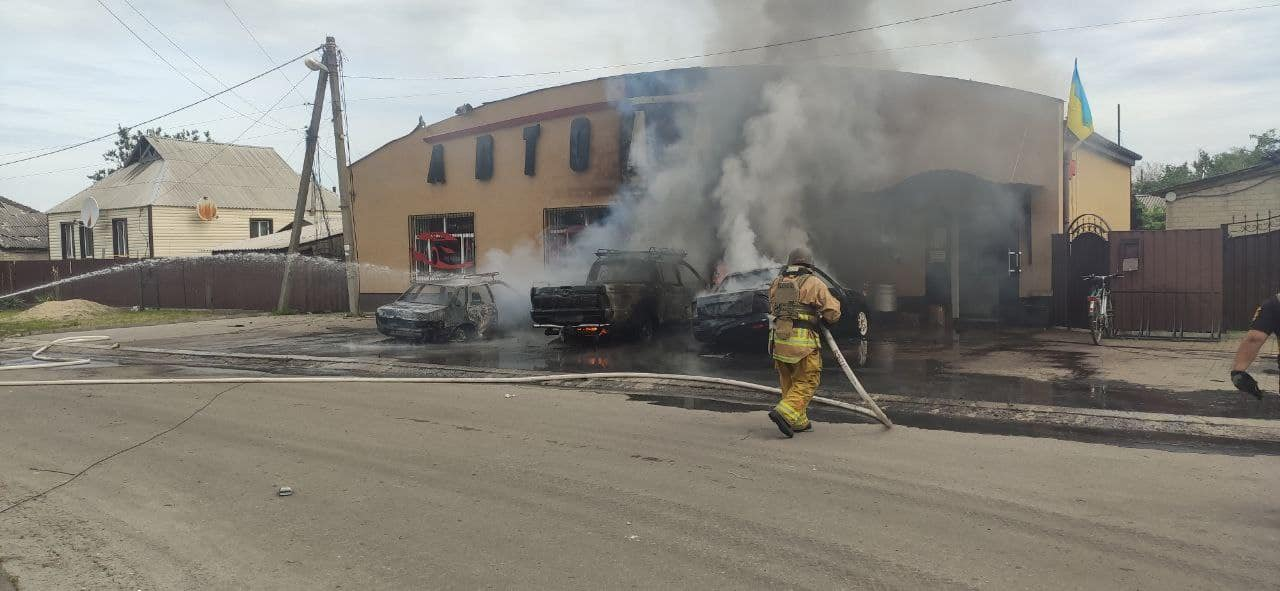
Damage from the cluster bombing in Lyman

On 8 July 2023, Russian cluster bombs launched by a BM-30 Smerch struck a residential area of Lyman in Donetsk Oblast. Nine civilians were killed and nineteen wounded. Witnesses said residents "had gathered to trade dairy products and fresh produce from their gardens, as they did most mornings." The use of cluster bombs in areas with civilians "makes an attack indiscriminate, in violation of international humanitarian law."

=== Siege of Mariupol ===
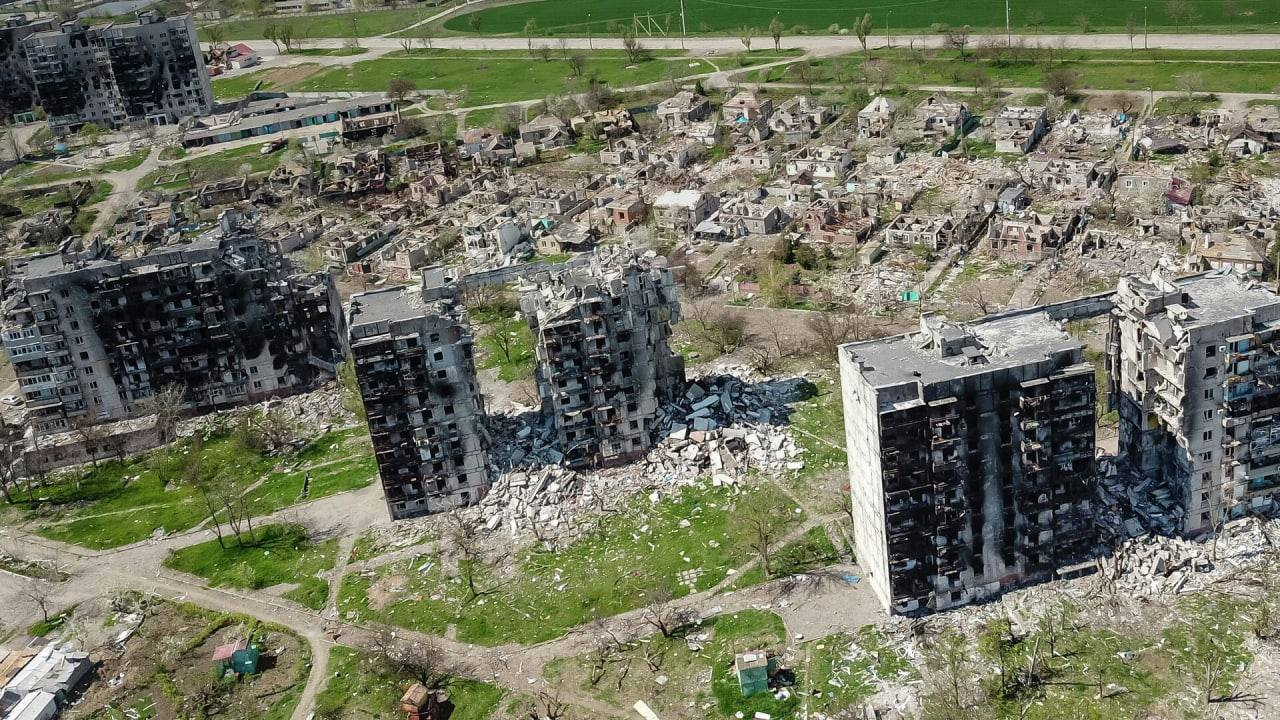
Destroyed residential buildings in Mariupol, 2022

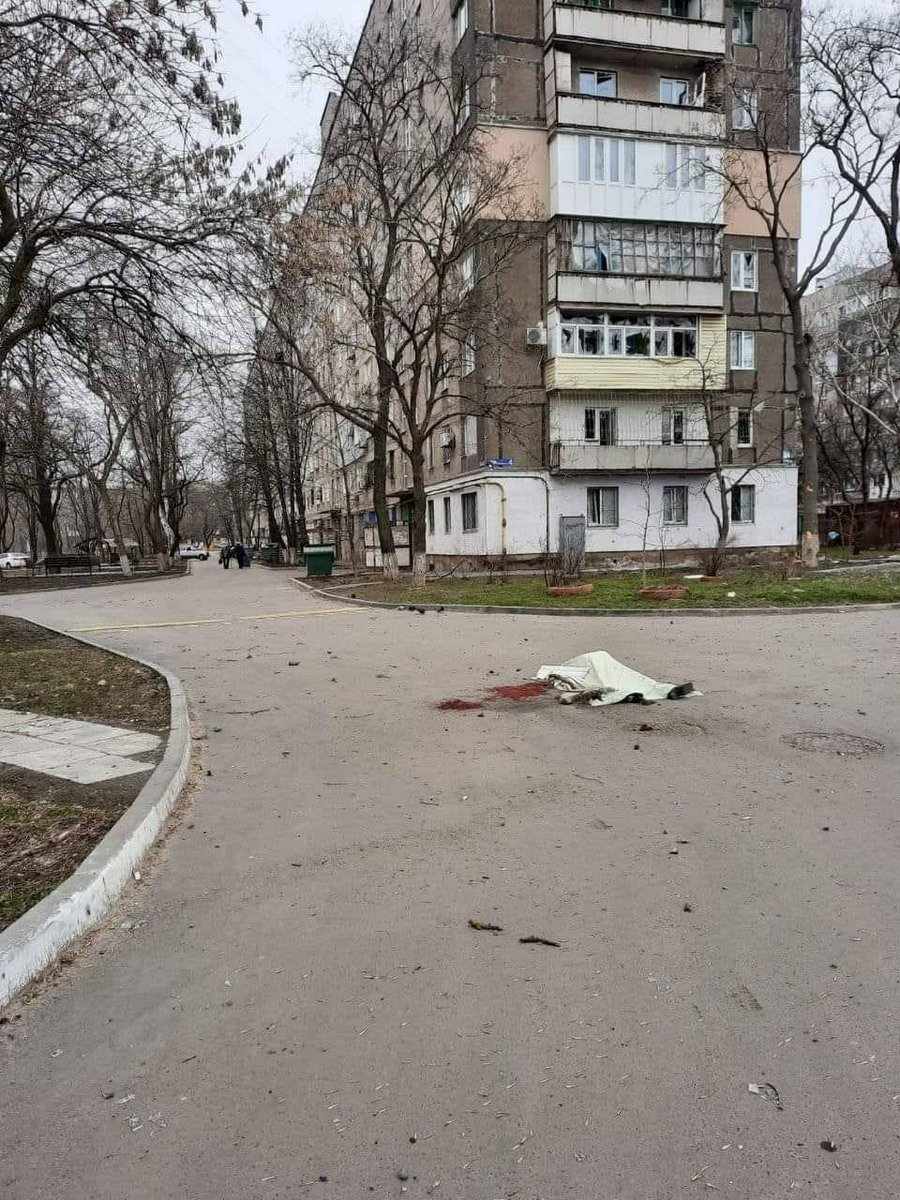
Ukrainian civilians killed by Russian shelling in Mariupol

Between 1 and 2 March 2022, Russian artillery reportedly shelled a densely populated neighbourhood in the city for nearly 15 hours, causing significant destruction. Deputy mayor Sergei Orlov reported that "at least hundreds of people [were] dead". On 16 March, the Institute for the Study of War (ISW) reported that Russian forces continued to commit war crimes in Mariupol, including "targeting civilian infrastructure". On 18 March, Lieutenant General James Hockenhull, Chief of Defence Intelligence for the United Kingdom (UK), described "continued targeting of civilians in Mariupol". As of 20 March, local authorities have estimated that at least 2,300 people were killed during the siege.

On 20 March 2022, Ukrainian authorities announced that Russian troops had bombed an art school in the city where hundreds (about 400) were sheltering. The Mariupol City Council made the announcement through the instant messaging service Telegram, highlighting that many of those sheltering in the school were women, children and elderly. However, Petro Andryushchenko, an advisor to the mayor of Mariupol, raised the concern that there was no exact number on how many people were using the school as a refuge.

By 18 April, Ukrainian officials estimated that at least 95% of Mariupol had been destroyed in the fighting, largely as a result of the Russian bombing campaigns. City officials reported that up to 21,000 civilians had been killed. On 16 June, the UN High Commissioner for Human Rights said that evidence strongly suggests the Russian armed forces committed serious violations of international humanitarian and human rights law in Mariupol, including the shelling and rocket attacks that destroyed much of the city. In a separate statement, Human Rights Watch said Russia's military tactics were indiscriminate and caused a disproportionate effect on the civilians in the city. It also warned that going forward, access to the city and preservation of evidence were likely to be issues, given Russia's occupation of the city, and it called for international accountability.

Independent media and the Ukrainian side accused the Russian military of bombing civilian shelters with cluster munitions during shelling of the city and attacks on Azovstal. According to the mayor of Mariupol, at the end of April, during the two-month siege of the city by Russian troops, more than 20 thousand people died—twice as many as during the 2-year occupation of the city during World War II. Oksana Pokalchuk, director of Amnesty International Ukraine, said they were able to prove the use of cluster munitions by Russia after interviewing a victim who provided them with a fragment of ammunition that was removed from his thigh.

==== Targeting of humanitarian corridors ====
During the shelling of Mariupol by Russian forces, a number of attempts to establish a humanitarian evacuation corridor to evacuate civilians from the city were made but failed when the corridor was targeted by Russian forces. On 5 March, a five-hour ceasefire was declared, but evacuations were quickly halted after shelling continued during the declared time. The next day, the International Committee of the Red Cross (ICRC) announced that a second attempt to establish an evacuation corridor had failed.

==== Mariupol hospital airstrike ====
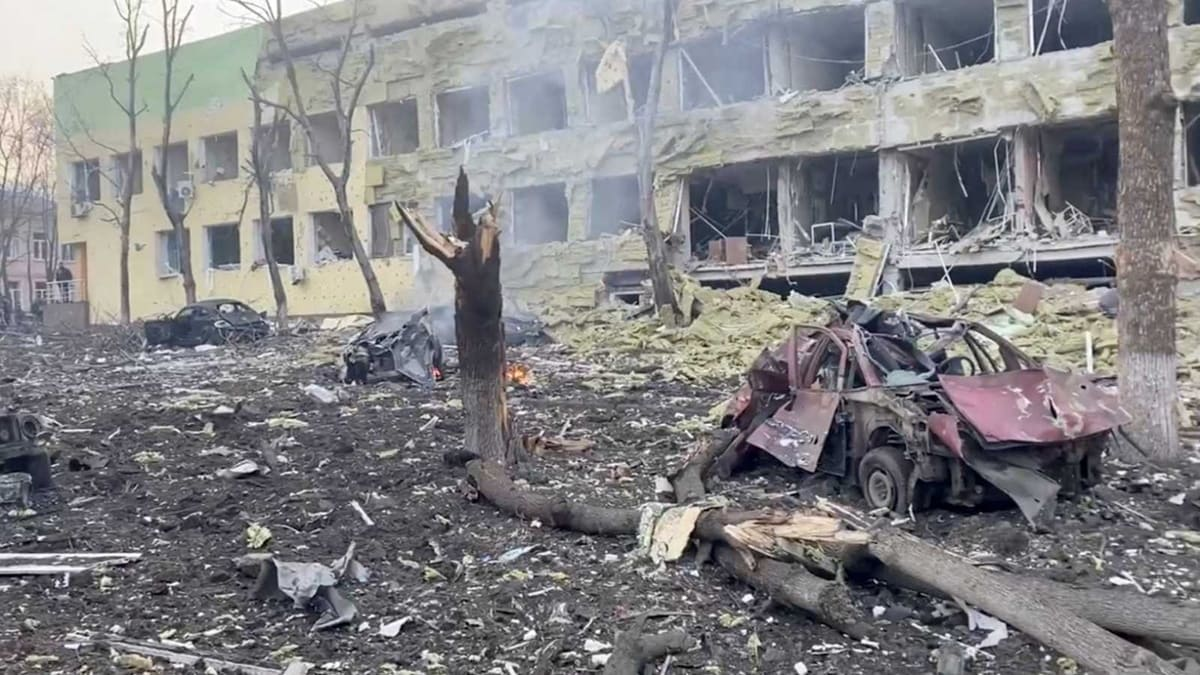
Aftermath of the Mariupol hospital airstrike

On 9 March 2022, Children's and Maternity Hospital No. 3, a hospital complex functioning both as a children's hospital and maternity ward, was bombed several times by Russian forces during a ceasefire, killing at least four people and injuring at least seventeen, also leading to at least one stillbirth Ukrainian authorities described the damage to the hospital as "colossal." Video footage following the attacks showed "much of the front of the building ... ripped away" and "mangled cars burning outside." Hospital wards were "reduced to a wreckage, walls [had] collapsed, rubble cover[ed] medical equipment, windows [were] blown out, and shattered glass [was] everywhere." On 10 March, local authorities stated that one girl and two other people had been killed in the bombing, one of whom was a woman at a late stage of pregnancy; neither she nor her unborn child survived. Ukrainian President Volodymyr Zelenskyy stated that people had "hidden" from the attack in time, minimising the number of casualties.

Deputy Mayor of Mariupol, Sergei Orlov, stated, "We don't understand how it is possible in modern life to bomb [a] children's hospital." The Mariupol City Council described the bombing by Russian aircraft as deliberate. Zelenskyy claimed that the attack constituted "proof that the genocide of Ukrainians [was] taking place." Sergei Orlov, deputy mayor of Mariupol, described the attack as both a war crime and genocide. British prime minister Boris Johnson described the attack as "depraved." Jen Psaki, press secretary of United States President Joe Biden, stated that "It is horrifying to see the ... barbaric use of military force to go after innocent civilians in a sovereign country." Josep Borrell, High Representative of the European Union for Foreign Affairs and Security Policy, described the bombing as a "heinous war crime". Cardinal Secretary of State of the Vatican City Pietro Parolin expressed dismay at the bombing, calling it an "unacceptable attack on civilians." António Guterres, Secretary-General of the United Nations, wrote that the attack was "horrific" and that "this senseless violence must stop."

On 10 March, the Russian Minister of Foreign Affairs and the Ministry of Defence publicly claimed that the bombing was justified. According to Ukrainska Pravda, foreign minister Sergey Lavrov confirmed that the bombing of the hospital was a deliberate action. He stated, "A few days ago, at a UN Security Council meeting, the Russian delegation presented factual information that this maternity hospital had long been taken over by the Azov Battalion and other radicals and that all the women in labour, all the nurses and in general all the staff had been told to leave it. It was a base of the ultra-radical Azov Battalion." On 10 March 2022, Twitter removed a tweet from the Russian embassy in the UK which claimed that the Mariupol hospital attack was "fake" and that Marianna Vyshegirskaya, one of the victims, was an "actress" by citing her blogging career, as a violation of Twitter rules. British politicians welcomed the move and accused the Russian embassy of disinformation. Meduza stated that the Russian representative to the United Nations, Vasily Nebenzya, had on 7 March referred to Maternity Hospital No. 1 (47.13892°N 37.60337°E) as a hospital that he claimed was used by Ukrainian armed forces as a firing point, not Maternity Hospital No. 3. Meduza described Lavrov as having confused Hospital No. 1, referred to by Nebenzya, with the hospital that was bombed, Hospital No. 3. On 22 March 2022, Russian journalist Alexander Nevzorov was charged under Russia's "fake news" law after he published information about the Russian shelling of a maternity hospital in Mariupol. Under a new law passed on 4 March, he could be sentenced to up to 15 years in prison.

==== Mariupol theatre airstrike ====
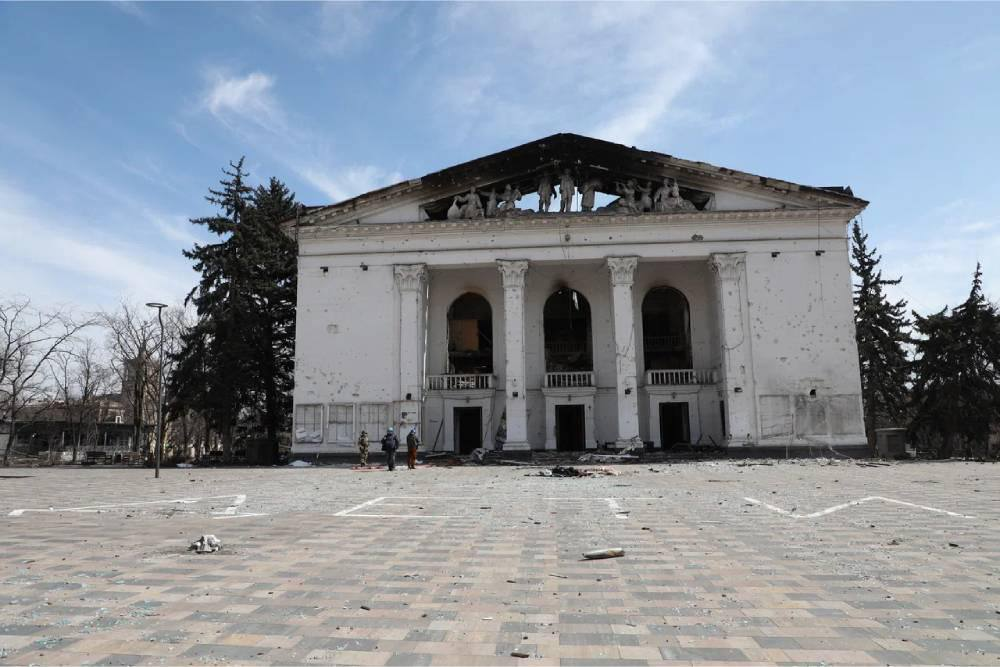
Mariupol theatre airstrike conducted by the Russian Armed Forces on 16 March 2022

On 16 March, Ukraine accused Russian forces of shelling civilian areas in Mariupol. Artillery hit numerous locations, including a swimming pool building and a vehicle convoy; shelling then struck the Donetsk Regional Drama Theatre that was being used as an air raid shelter. With a large number of civilians inside, the building was reduced to rubble. The bomb shelter in the basement of the theatre survived the bombing, but many people were still trapped underneath the burning rubble. A member of the Ukrainian parliament from Mariupol, Dmytro Gurin, said that the rescue efforts were hampered due to continued attacks on the area by Russian forces.

By 17 March, the number of casualties was unclear; some emerged alive. By 18 March, around 130 survivors had been rescued. The Mariupol City Council stated that according to initial information, no one had been killed, although one person was gravely wounded. On 25 March, the council estimated that about 300 people had been killed as a result of the airstrike. On 4 May, Associated Press published an investigation with evidence pointing to 600 dead in the airstrike. Many survivors estimated around 200 people—including rescuers—escaping through the main exit or one side entrance; the other side and the back were crushed. Estimates of civilian deaths vary, ranging from at least a dozen (Amnesty International) to 600 (Associated Press). At least eleven are confirmed by a Russian source.

Ukraine accused the Russian Armed Forces of deliberately bombing the theatre while it was sheltering civilians. Russia first claimed that the reason the theatre was bombed was because it was "being used as a base by the Ukrainian military", and then denied the allegations and instead accused the Azov Battalion of blowing up the building, Both Russian claims have been refuted by independent investigation. The theatre is among the many Ukrainian heritage and cultural sites destroyed during the invasion. The attack was classified as a war crime by the Organization for Security and Co-operation in Europe and Amnesty International.

=== Kramatorsk railway station attack ===
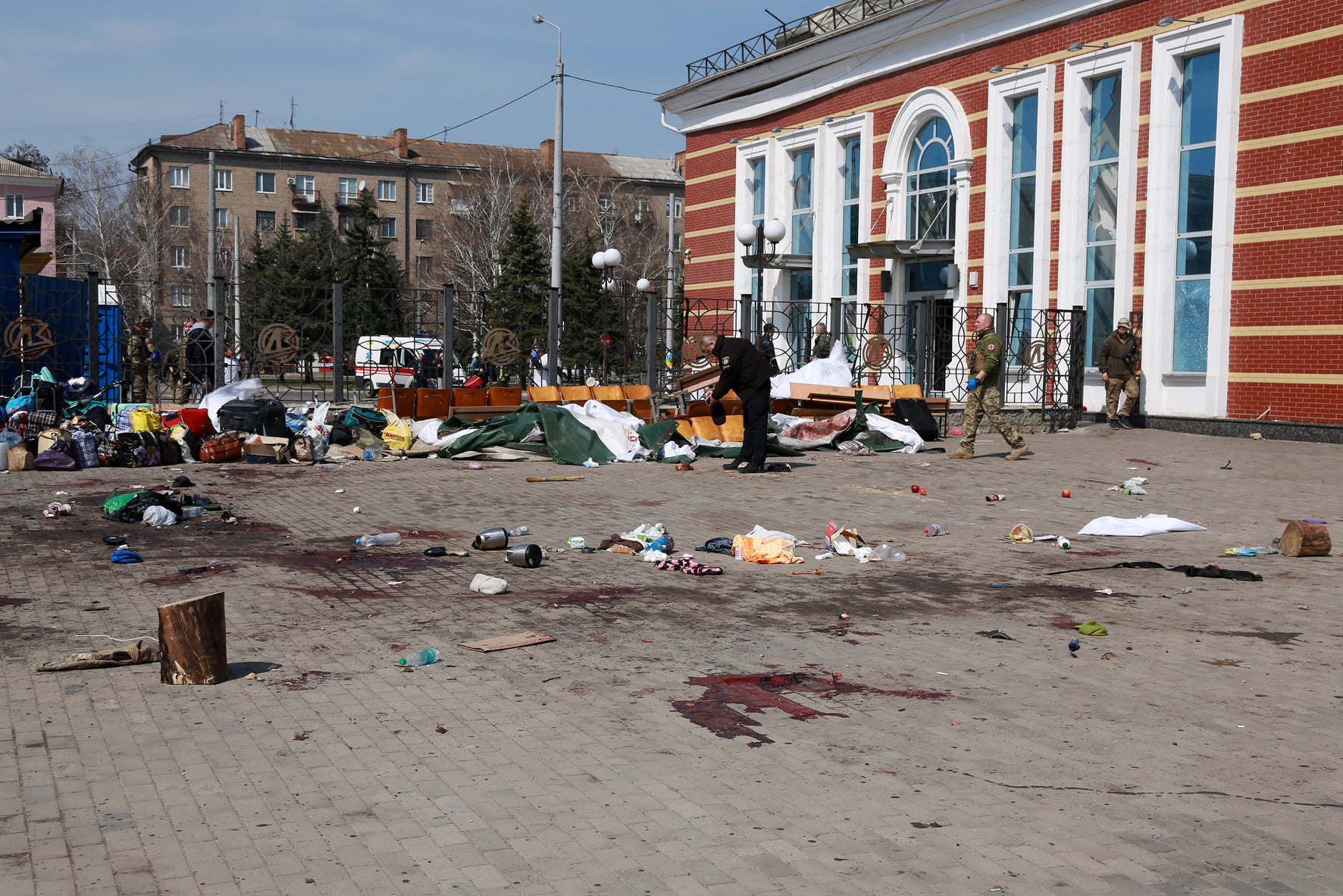
Aftermath of the Kramatorsk railway station attack, April 2022

On 8 April 2022, at 10:24 and 10:25, media affiliated with the Donetsk People's Republic published videos showing a pair of missiles being launched from Shakhtarsk, a city under separatist control. At approximately 10:30, two missiles hit near the railway station building in Kramatorsk, and the first reports were published in Ukrainian media at around 10:45. According to the Ukrainian government, between 1000 and 4000 civilians, mainly women and children, were present at the station awaiting evacuation from the region, which was being subjected to heavy Russian shelling. the attack left at least 60 dead and 110+ wounded. The missiles were initially misidentified as Iskander ballistic missiles. Pavlo Kyrylenko, governor of Donetsk oblast, later specified that they had rather been Tochka-U missiles armed with cluster munitions. The remnants of one of the missiles had the Russian words ЗА ДЕТЕЙ (za detey), meaning "[in revenge] for the children", painted in white on its outside. It also bore serial number Ш91579, which investigators said could potentially help trace it back to its original arsenal.

Initially, Russian state media and pro-Russian telegram channels claimed successful Russian airstrikes on a military transport target in Kramatorsk. However, after it became clear that the missiles had killed civilians, earlier reports were redacted; the Russian government also denied responsibility for the attack, and the Russian Ministry of Defence characterized it as a "Ukrainian hoax." The Russian Ministry of Defence later claimed that the missiles were launched by Ukrainian forces from the city of Dobropillia, southwest of Kramatorsk. Russian media also said that the serial number of the missile was in the same range as one used by Ukrainian forces; however, these claims were rapidly debunked. A fake video clip with a mock BBC logo, attributing blame to the Ukrainian forces, circulated through pro-Russian telegram channels and Russian state television since 10 April. However, the BBC said that it has not produced any such video. The Russian Ministry of Defense claimed that their forces no longer use Tochka-U missiles. However, Amnesty International had published videos about the use of Tochka-U missiles in other cities before Kramatorsk. investigators from the open-source Belarusian Hajun project had also published videos of several Russian trucks with Tochka missiles heading from Belarus to Ukraine with 'V' markings on 5 and 30 March. The Institute for the Study of War assessed that the Russian 8th Guards Combined Arms Army, which is active in the Donbas area, is equipped with Tochka-U missiles.

Michelle Bachelet, the United Nations High Commissioner for Human Rights; Dunja Mijatović; the Council of Europe Commissioner for Human Rights; Ukrainian President Volodymyr Zelenskyy; European Commission President Ursula von der Leyen; French Foreign Minister Jean-Yves Le Drian; British Defence Secretary Ben Wallace; United Nations Secretary-General António Guterres and Oleksandr Kamyshin, chairman of Ukrainian Railways, described the event as "war crimes" and "a crime against humanity" by Russian forces. The Security Service of Ukraine opened criminal proceedings under Article 438 of the Criminal Code. Royal United Services Institute analyst Justin Bronk said that Russia aimed to damage Ukrainian transport infrastructure to make it difficult for Ukrainian forces to move around Donbas. He also suggested that Russia opted for the Tochka-U missile type due to its use by the Ukrainian army, in order to "muddy the waters." The Pentagon highlighted Russian responsibility for the attack, as well as the strategic importance of the railway junction.

=== Kramatorsk restaurant strike ===
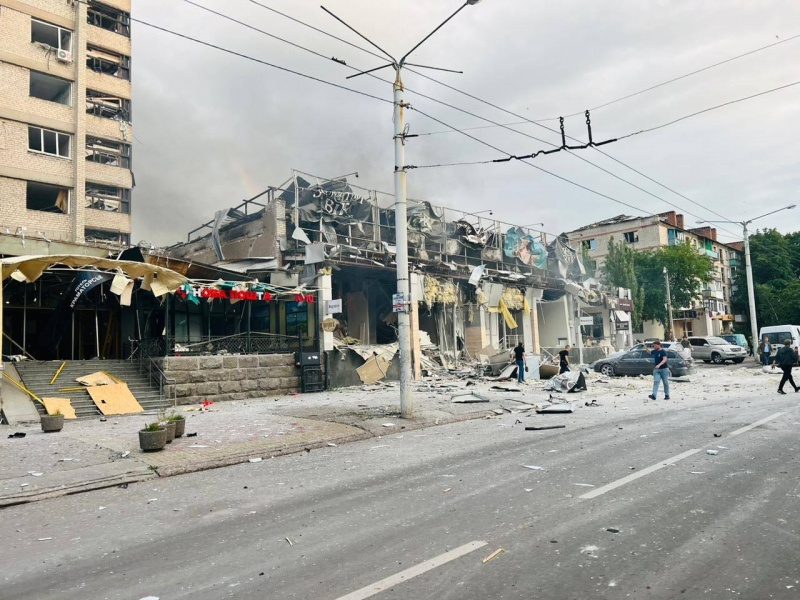
Aftermath of the Kramatorsk restaurant strike, June 2023

On 27 June 2023, Russian forces attacked a pizza restaurant in Kramatorsk with an Iskander missile, killing 13 people, including four children and Ukrainian writer Victoria Amelina. About sixty people were wounded.

Kramatorsk was about 18 miles (30 km) from the eastern frontline. The restaurant was popular with local civilians; war correspondents; humanitarian volunteers; as well as Ukrainian soldiers on leave to 'rest and recuperate' and meet their loved ones. Several journalists were having a meal when the missile struck, including three Colombians. Russia's Defense Ministry claimed the strike targeted a "temporary command post" of the Ukrainian army. Ukraine's prosecutor general said the missile has high precision, "which means Russia was deliberately targeting civilians." Ukraine's Security Service later arrested a local man who allegedly helped coordinate the strike with the Russian military.

=== July 2025 Kramatorsk residential building strike ===
On 22 July 2025, a Russian aerial bomb hit a residential apartment building in Kramatorsk, injuring at least eight civilians and killing a 10-year-old boy.

=== Chasiv Yar missile strike ===
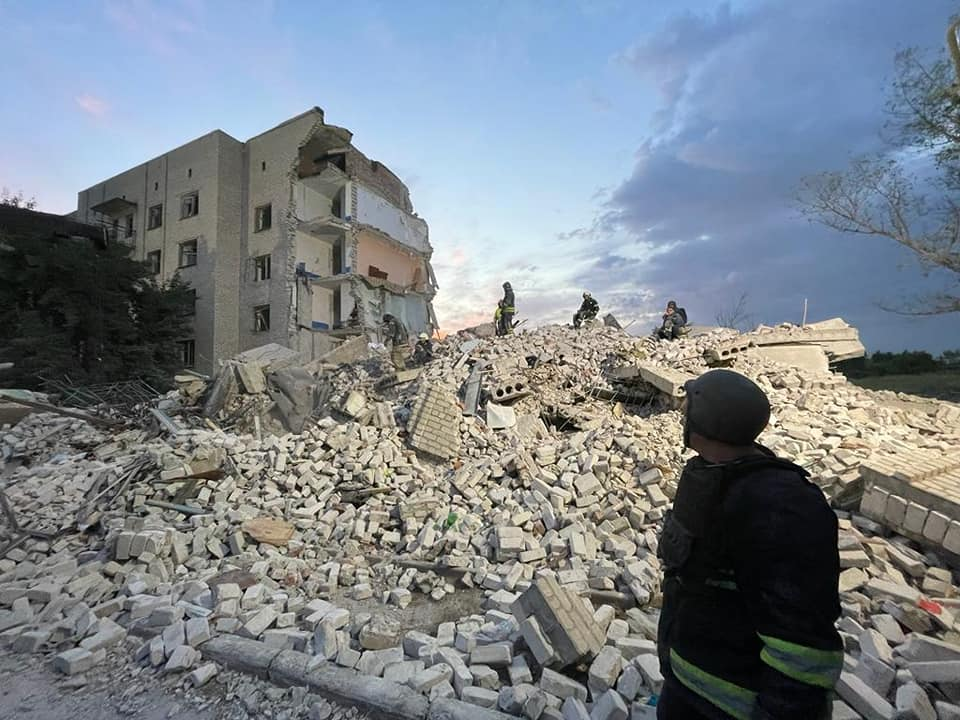
Aftermath of the Chasiv Yar rocket strike

On 9 July 2022, a missile strike on two residential buildings in Chasiv Yar was carried out by the Russian Armed Forces at 21:17 local time. At least 48 people were killed. Due to the impact, a five-story residential building partially collapsed. Two entrances were completely destroyed. The strike was alleged, including by Donetsk Oblast governor Pavlo Kyrylenko, to have been performed with "Uragan," a self-propelled 220 mm multiple rocket launcher designed in the Soviet Union. The Russian Defense Ministry claimed that they destroyed a "temporary deployment point" of a Ukrainian territorial defence unit. As of 10 July, 67 rescue workers of the State Emergency Service of Ukraine were trying to help the victims and more than 20 people were still feared to be trapped under the rubble. Rescue and search operations continued until the morning of 14 July 2022. Rescuers dismantled about 525 tons of destroyed elements of the building. 323 employees of the State Emergency Service and 9 units of equipment were involved. As of 13 July 48 dead were found under the rubble of the building, and nine wounded were rescued as of 12 July. A local resident told The New York Times that there were 10 elderly civilians in the buildings, but that members of the military had come to lodge there two days earlier. Two soldiers who probably took turns sleeping in the building after being on duty were among the dead. Andriy Yermak, the chief of staff to Ukraine's president, said that the strike was "another terrorist attack" and that Russia should be designated a "state sponsor of terrorism" as a result. Russian military spokesman Igor Konashenkov stated that Russia had killed "over 300 nationalists" in an attack on Chasiv Yar, but did not specify whether or not they were referring to the July airstrike or an earlier attack.

=== Donetsk City ===
On 27 July 2022, thousands of miniature plastic antipersonnel PFM-1 mines were dispersed over civilian areas of the Russian held city of Donetsk by a BM-27 Uragan multiple rocket launcher. This resulted in a number of people being injured, most prominently Semen Pegov, a Russian war blogger calling himself "War Gonzo." The Russian Foreign Ministry and local sources accused the Ukrainian army of being responsible for their deployment. The so-called "butterfly mines" are banned under the 1997 Ottawa Treaty (signed by Ukraine but not by Russia) due to the high danger they pose to civilians.

=== Sloviansk missile strike ===
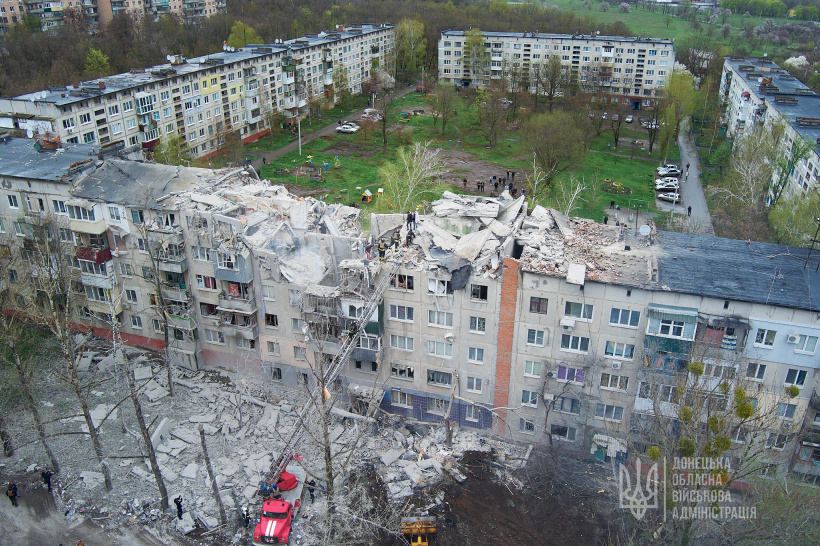
Damage from the April 2023 Sloviansk missile strike

On 14 April 2023, on Orthodox Christian Good Friday, Russian forces launched eight S-300 missiles at Sloviansk. One struck a five-story residential building, killing 15 civilians, including a child, and wounding 24.

=== Kostiantynivka shopping centre missile attack ===
On 9 August 2024, a Kostiantynivka shopping centre was struck by a Russian air-to-surface missile in the middle of the day. Ukrainian authorities reported at least 14 deaths and 43 injuries.

=== Dobropillia airstrikes ===
On 8 March 2025, the Ukrainian Interior Ministry and Donetsk Oblast Governor Vadym Filashkin said that Russian missile and drone attacks on Dobropillia had killed 11 people and injured 47, with children being among five of the dead and seven of the injured. The attack took place shortly after US president Donald Trump halted intelligence sharing with Ukraine, causing concerns that Russian missiles could now strike cities without prior warning.

=== Yarova airstrike ===
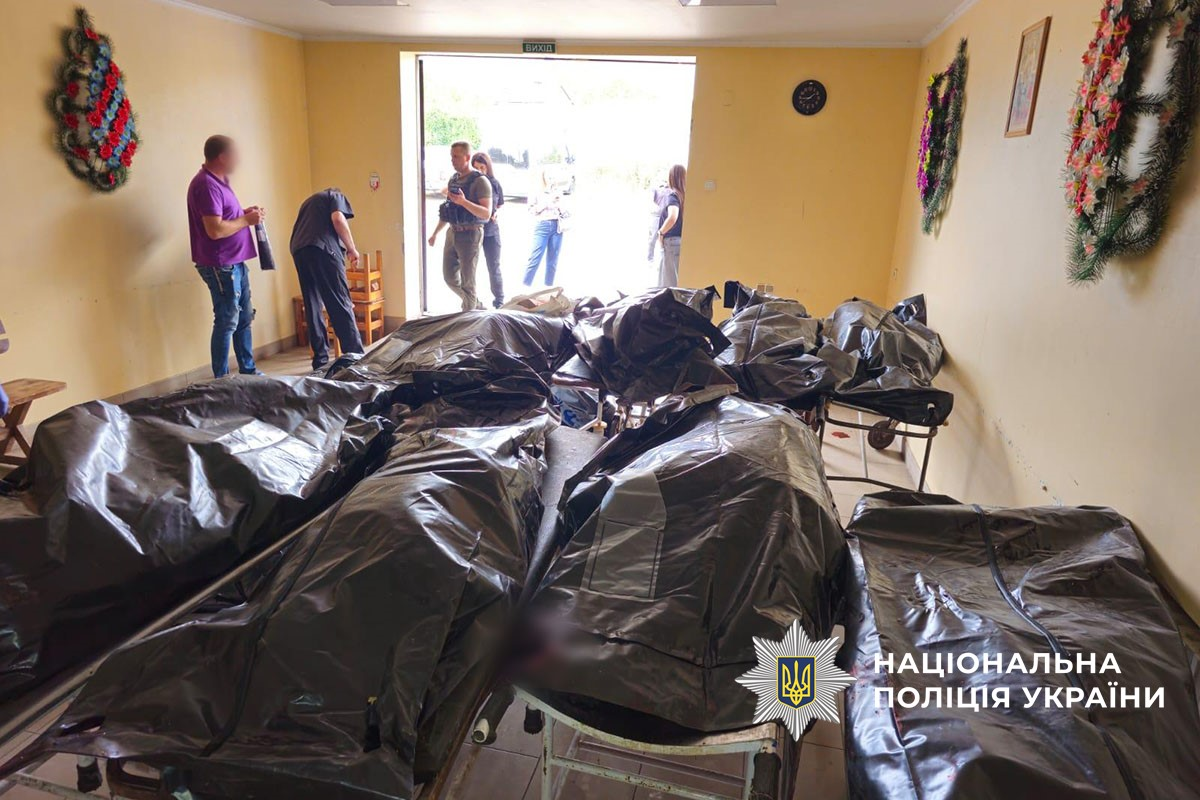
Victims of those killed in the Yarova airstrike

On 9 September 2025, officials said a Russian guided bomb struck the village of Yarova, killing 24 elderly people who were collecting their pensions in the village and wounding another 19 people.

=== 2025 Christmas attack ===
On 26 December 2025, senators from the US Democratic and Republican parties condemned Russian attacks on Ukrainian civilians gathering to celebrate Christmas, with a Russian strike in Donetsk killing a volunteer from Kharkiv.

=== Shelling of Druzhkivka ===
On 4 February 2026, Donetsk officials said that Russian forces shelled a Druzhkivka market during busy hours, killing seven people and wounding 15 others. Donetsk governor Filashkin called the attack, which took place as Ukrainian and Russian officials were taking part in US-brokered negotiations, a war crime and said that cluster munitions were used for the attack.

On 12 July 2026, the ″12 Vartovykh″ (12 Guards) charity said that a volunteer who had rescued hundreds of animals from dangerous areas was killed by a Russian guided aerial bomb in Druzhkivka.

=== July 2026 airstrikes on residential infrastructure ===
On 10 July 2026, regional officials said that Russia carried out seven airstrikes on Kramatorsk and Bilenke striking residential houses and apartments and killing four civilians, including two siblings aged 14 and 18, and injuring nine people. A war crime investigation was launched by the Donetsk Oblast Prosecutor's Office.

On 17 July, Filashkin said that one person was killed in Nadiia, while Russian attacks also injured 14 people across the Donetsk region, most of them in Kramatorsk.

=== August 2026 aerial bomb strike ===
On 31 August 2026, Vadym Liakh, the head of Sloviansk's city administration, said that four people had been injured when Russia struck a residential building with a FAB-500 aerial bomb. The Donetsk Oblast Prosecutor's Office said that the bomb was equipped with a guidance kit, with the strike damaging 34 apartment blocks and houses.

=== September 2026 Kramatorsk shelling ===
On 20 September 2026, Kramatorsk officials said one person had been killed by repeated Russian shelling.

=== October 2026 glide bomb attack on civilian buses ===
On 8 October 2026, Ukrainian authorities said that at least 30 people were killed and 18 wounded by Russian glide bombs striking civilian buses in Kramatorsk, which regional head Filashkin said were being targeted to kill as many civilians as possible. Another three people were reported to have been killed in Bilenke.

On 28 October, Ukrainska Pravda reported that a Canadian volunteer helping animals and people in Ukraine had been killed by a Russian drone strike in Kramatorsk while evacuating animals on 25 october.

== Bombardment of Izium ==
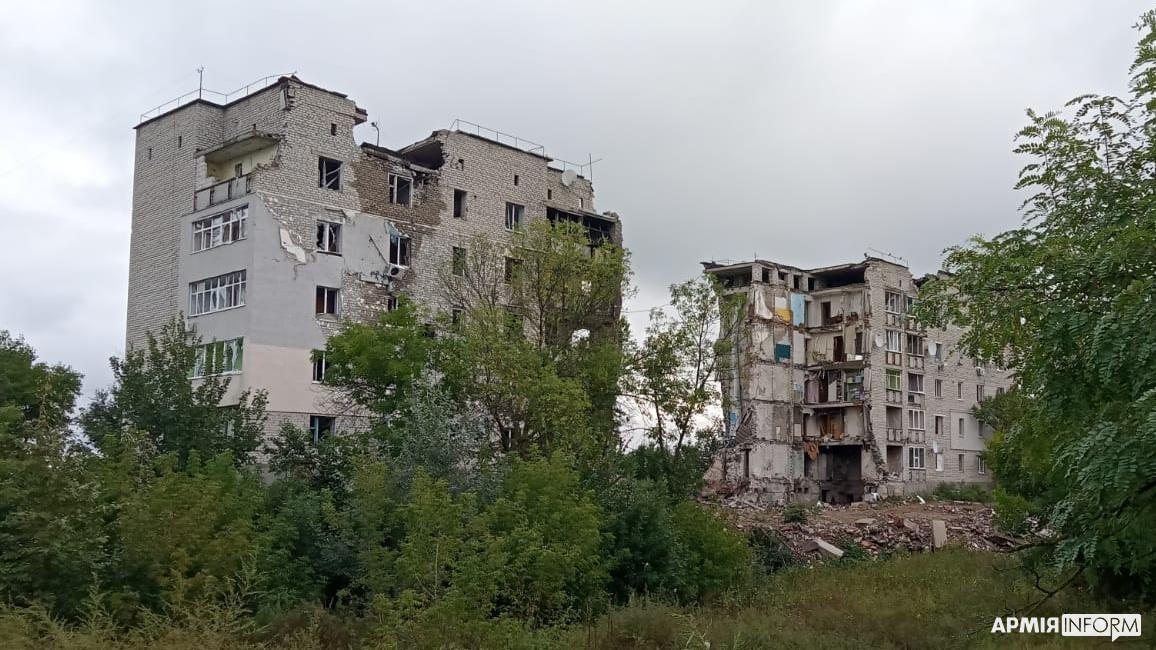
Destroyed apartment blocks in Izium

On 3 March 2022, Russian forces bombed the central hospital in Izium. Eight people died, and the hospital sustained "significant damage." On 8 March, the same recently refurbished hospital in the city was destroyed during shelling, this was followed on 11 March by an attack to a psychiatric hospital. On 15 September 2022, after Ukrainian forces had retaken Izium, several mass graves were discovered of more than 440 bodies buried in a forest northeast of the city. Among the dead, some had reportedly died as a result of shelling and airstrikes. Forensic investigations and questioning of witnesses were ongoing as of 16 September 2022.

== Kharkiv Oblast ==
=== Bombardment of Kharkiv ===
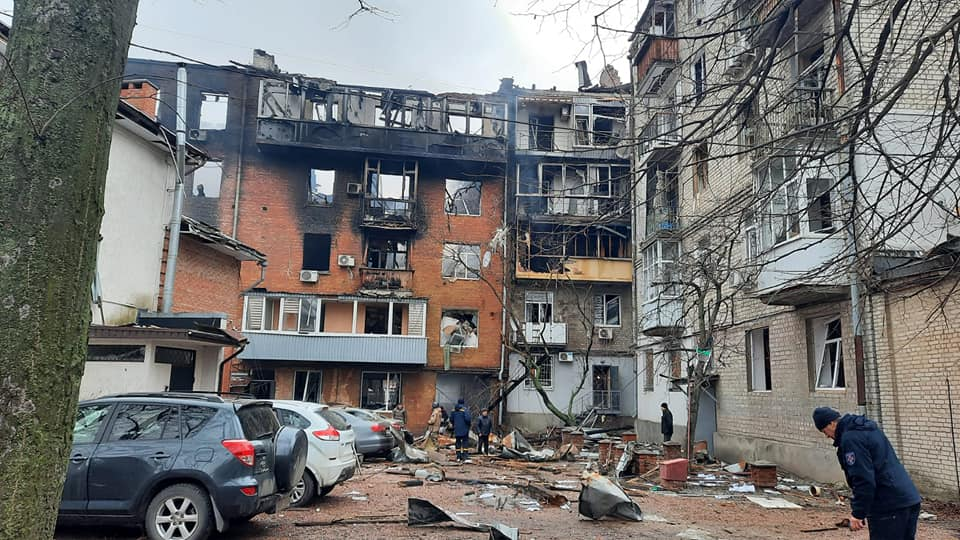
Residential buildings in Kharkiv Oblast shelled by Russian forces

During and after the Battle of Kharkiv, extensive parts of residential areas have been destroyed by Russian shelling.

According to an HRW report published on 4 March, on 28 February, at around 10:00 AM, Russian forces fired cluster munitions with Grad rockets into at least three different residential areas in Kharkiv, killing at least nine civilians and injuring another 37. The city's mayor, Ihor Terekhov, said that four people were killed when they left a shelter to get water, and a family of two parents and three children were burned alive in their car. The locations hit were residential buildings and a playground, dispersed between the Industrialnyi and Shevchenkivskyi Districts. Explosions in the city were recorded as late as 2:23 PM.

On 1 March, a shell damaged a boarding school for blind children. As of 4 March, 122 civilians, including five children, had been killed in the Kharkiv Oblast, according to the Kharkiv Regional Police. Out of an initial population of 1.8 million, only 500,000 people remained in Kharkiv by 7 March. On 18 March, the number of civilians reportedly killed in Kharkiv exceeded 450 as a consequence of the use of cluster munitions and explosive weapons in heavily populated areas of the city. On 24 March, a cluster munition attack killed eight people, and fifteen were injured while queuing for humanitarian aid together with hundreds of civilians near the Akademika Pavlova metro station. On 24 March 2022, a Russian missile strike hit a shopping mall parking lot near the Akademika Pavlova metro station. At the time, hundreds of people were waiting outside a post office in the mall to obtain humanitarian aid. Six people were killed and at least 15 further were injured. Two further cluster bombings damaged the nearby Holy Trinity Church, where volunteers were preparing humanitarian aid.

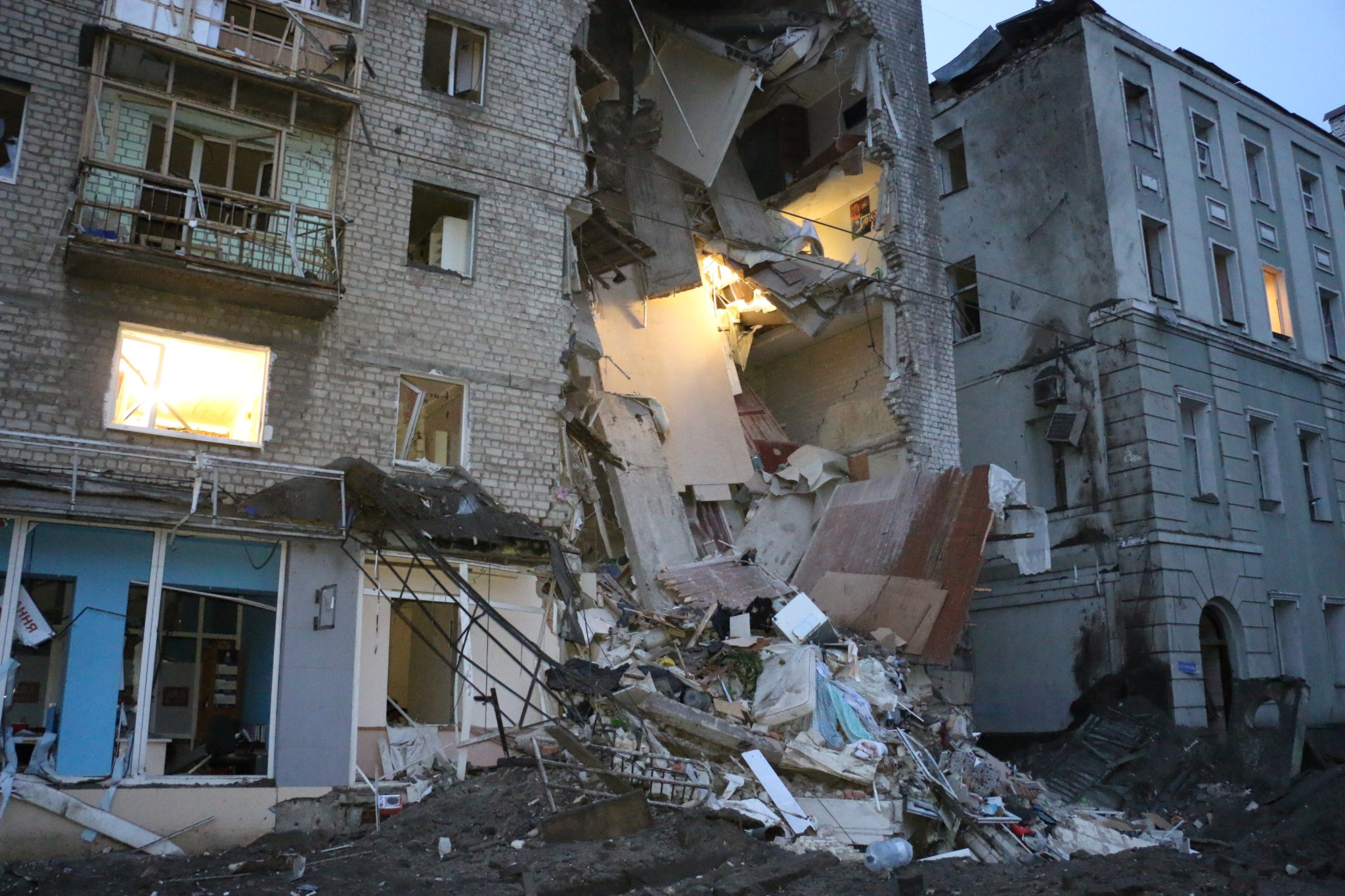
Residential building in the center of Kharkiv destroyed by a Russian missile strike

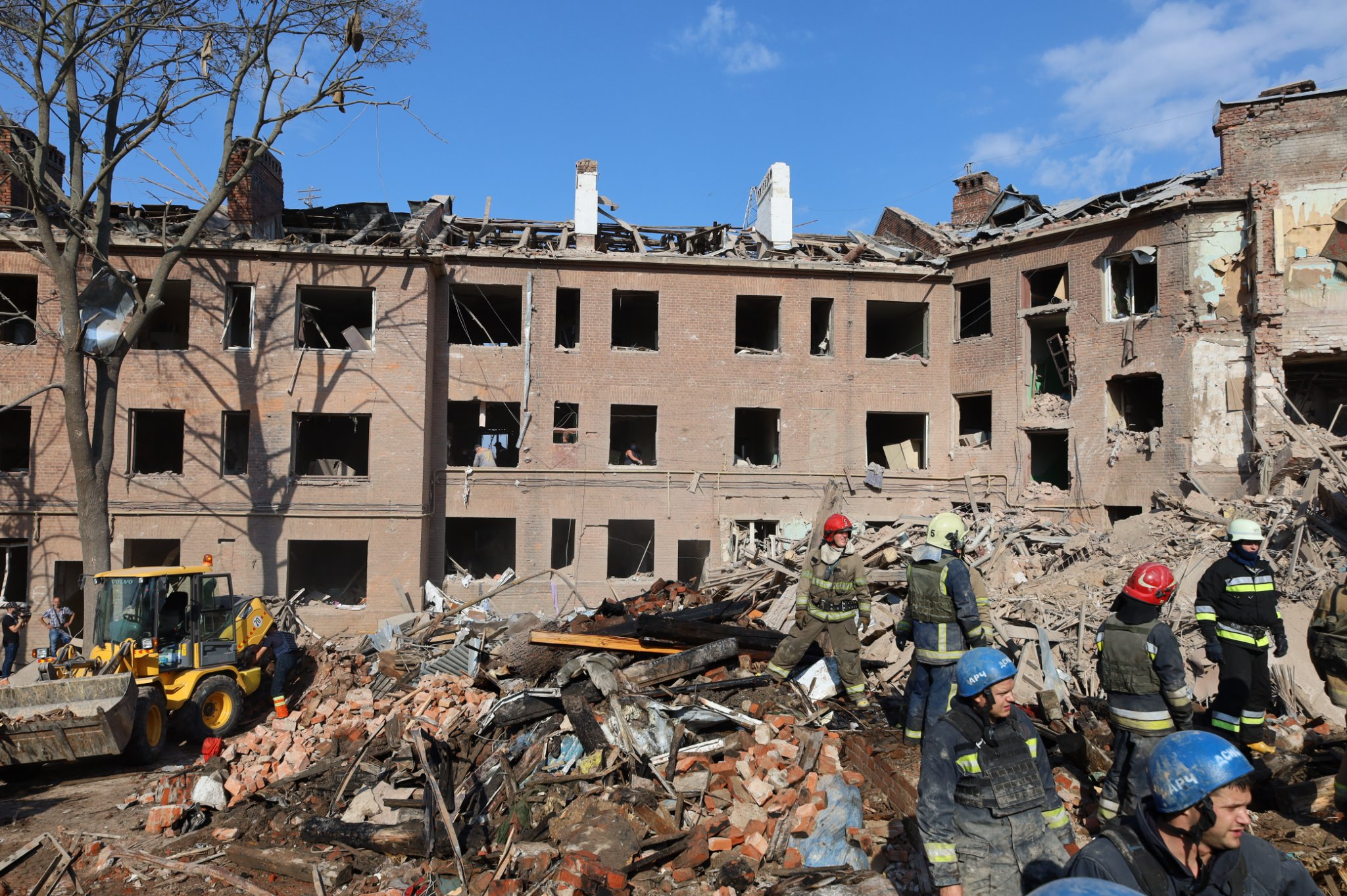
Aftermath of the Kharkiv dormitories missile strike, 17 August 2022

On 15 April 2022 in the afternoon, during the battle of Kharkiv, the Russian army fired 9N210/9N235 cluster bombs into the Industrialnyi District, striking a residential area and a playground on Myru Street. Nine civilians died and 35 were injured, including children. The local hospital received wounded people with pieces of steel rod and shrapnel in their limbs. Overall, the cluster bombs detonated over an area of 700 square metres.

Human Rights Watch investigated the attack and concluded that the Russian forces used Smerch cluster munition rockets, which disperse dozens of submunitions or bomblets in the air. As there were no military targets within 400 metres (1,300 ft) of these strikes and due to the indiscriminate use of these weapons against densely populated areas, HRW described these strikes as possible war crimes. On 13 May, CNN reported that newly collected evidence identified Colonel General Alexander Zhuravlyov commanding the 79th Rocket Artillery Brigade, ordered the use 17 cluster bombs, the 300mm Smerch Cluster Rocket, to be used against civilian targets in Kharkiv on 27–28 February.

On 13 June Amnesty International published a report on what it called the "relentless campaign of indiscriminate bombardments against Kharkiv" causing "wholesale destruction" in the city from 24 February until late April. The human rights organisation's researchers found fragments of seven cluster munition strikes in different neighbourhoods of Kharkiv and gathered evidence of the use of scatterable land mines and Grad rockets. Amnesty International documented a total of 28 indiscriminate strikes in populated areas of Kharkiv which they claim may constitute war crimes and which caused hundreds of civilian casualties and injured many more.

On 11 July 2022, a Russian wave of shelling killed six people and injured 31 in the Ukrainian city of Kharkiv. The mayor, Ihor Terekhov, said that the areas shelled were residential areas with "no military significance," including several civilian houses, stores, a tire repair store, and a school. Reuters confirmed that at least one residential structure had been hit. Authorities said that six civilians had died, including a 17-year-old teenager and his father. Oleh Synyehubov said that the Russians had used "artillery, multiple rocket launchers, and tank attacks" on Kharkiv.

On 17 August 2022, at 4:30 am, several rockets fired from Belgorod hit the Slobidskyi and Saltivskyi districts of Kharkiv. In the Slobidskyi District, a four-story hostel of a tram depot was hit together with an adjacent repair workshop and a neighboring non-residential building. The second missile attack was carried out at 21:30 and destroyed a three-story hostel in the Saltivskyi District, where people with hearing impairments lived. The missile attack caused a fire, and the building was completely destroyed. In the Slobidskyi District, two people were initially killed, with the bodies of six people subsequently being excavated from under the ruins; 18 were also injured, including two children. Ten units of fire and rescue equipment worked at the scene of the shelling along with forty rescuers of the State Emergency Service. In the Saltivskyi district, at least 19 people were killed and 22 injured, including an 11-year-old child, in total, 27 (including 1 child) were killed, and 44 (including 3 children) were injured. On 19 August, mourning was declared in Kharkiv.

The Russian Defense Ministry confirmed the missile attack on Kharkiv in its briefing. According to their version, "a high-precision ground-based weapon hit a temporary base for foreign mercenaries," and as a result, "more than 90 militants were destroyed." President of Ukraine Volodymyr Zelenskyy said, "When you hear about Kharkiv Saltivka, it's pain again. Pain for all Ukraine. Pain for Kharkiv," he wrote. "Rocket attack... On the hostel... The building is completely destroyed." The president described the killing of residents as "a vile and cynical blow to civilians, which has no justification and demonstrates the impotence of the aggressor." According to the head of the military administration of the Kharkiv Oblast, Oleh Synyehubov, "The Russians brutally and purposefully attacked civilians. And now in their so-called "media," they are spreading another fake about "military facilities." There are no military installations. Exclusively civilian facilities, including pensioners and children. This is real terrorism, which only fiends are capable of!"

On 6 April 2024, Ukrainian authorities said that Russian missile attacks had killed seven people and wounded a dozen in Kharkiv, with the strikes damaging administrative buildings, dormitories, shops, high-rise buildings, and a kindergarten. The Kharkiv police said that Russia attacked the city with two S-300 missiles and then engaged with drones during the rescue operations.

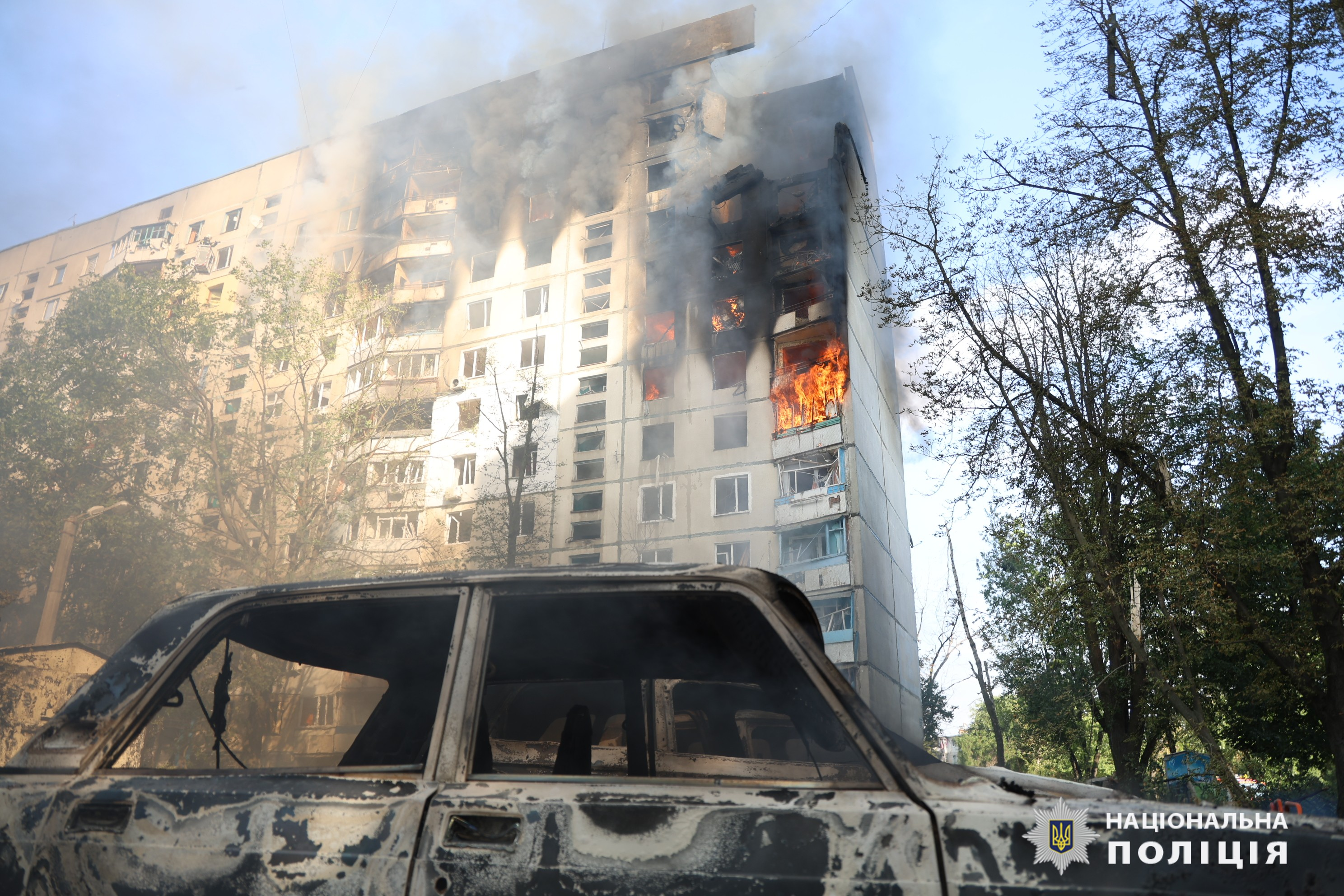
Damage from the 30 August 2024 glide bomb attack on Kharkiv, which killed six people

On 30 August 2024, at least five people, including a 14-year-old girl, were killed in Kharkiv by a reported Russian glide bomb attack that struck a 12-story apartment building and the playground in front of it. Dozens of people were also wounded in the attack.

On 28 October 2024, a Russian guided bomb attack on Kharkiv shattered much of the Derzhprom, a building placed on the "tentative" list of UNESCO World Heritage sites. Six people were injured in the attack, with another 13 being wounded in an earlier overnight bomb attack.

On 31 October 2024, three people were killed, two of them children, and 35 people were injured in a Russian attack on an apartment block in Kharkiv. According to Oleh Syniehubov, Kharkiv's governor, Russia used a highly explosive FAB-500 bomb to strike the block.

On 29 April 2025, regional officials said that dozens of people had been injured after Russian drone strikes on Kharkiv, including two children and a pregnant woman.

On 2 May 2025, Russia launched a mass drone strike on Kharkiv, striking 12 locations across four of the city's central districts, with officials saying that the attack wounded 46 people and damaged civilian infrastructure, including a high-rise apartment block.

On 10–11 June 2025, Russian drone strikes killed three people and injured 60, nine children aged between two and 15 being among the injured, caused by 17 drones striking two residential areas, according to officials.

On 24 July 2025, regional officials said that two people were killed and at least 33 wounded when Russian glide bombs struck a residential neighbourhood. Regional governor Syniehubov said a month-old infant and a 10-year-old child were among the wounded.

On 28 July 2025, a Russian strike on a queue for humanitarian aid in the north-eastern Kharkiv region killed five people.

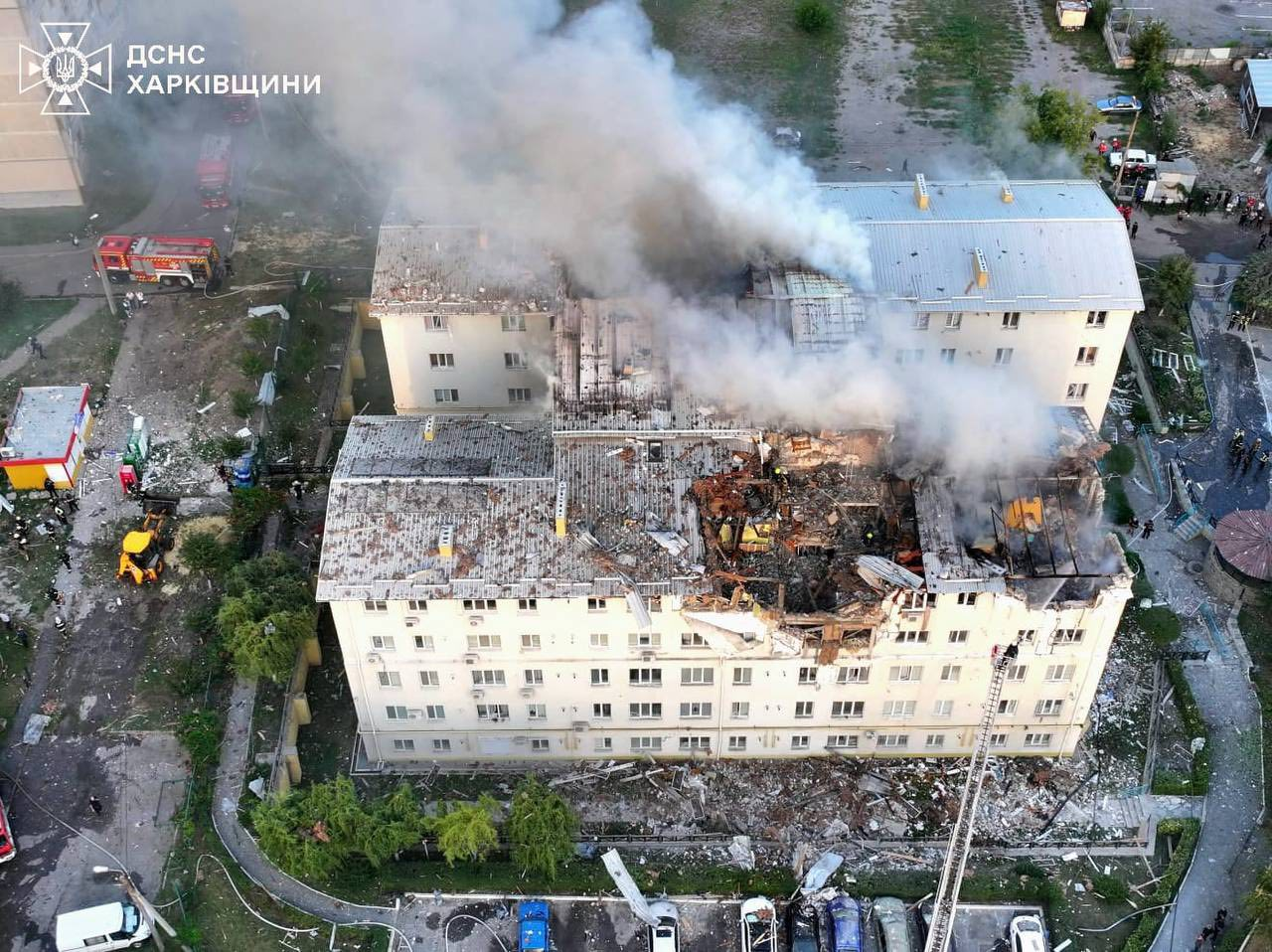
Destruction from the Russian drone strike on Kharkiv, 18 August 2025, which killed a whole family

On 18 August 2025, there were multiple Russian strikes on Kharkiv. The local mayor said that a ballistic missile had wounded 11 people, while hours later a Russian drone attack on a residential building killed seven people, an entire family including a toddler and her brother aged 16 being among the killed. Authorities also said that 23 people had been wounded in the drone attack, which reduced part of the building to rubble and caused fires across multiple floors. The attacks took place hours before Zelenskyy and several European officials were expected to have talks with U.S. President Trump, with Zelenskyy denouncing the attacks as "Moscow trying to pressure Ukraine and Europe" and "humiliate diplomatic efforts to end the war."

On 22 October 2025, officials said that Russia had struck a kindergarten in Kharkiv with children in attendance around 9 AM local time, setting it ablaze and killing one person while wounding seven others, six of them children. The attack caused the evacuation of dozens of children, reportedly causing acute stress reactions in many of them. The attack took place hours after Trump-Putin talks collapsed.

On 17 November 2025, a Russian missile strike on Kharkiv damaged residential blocks in the city center, killing three people and wounding 11 according to regional officials, with four minors being among the injured.

=== Hroza missile attack ===
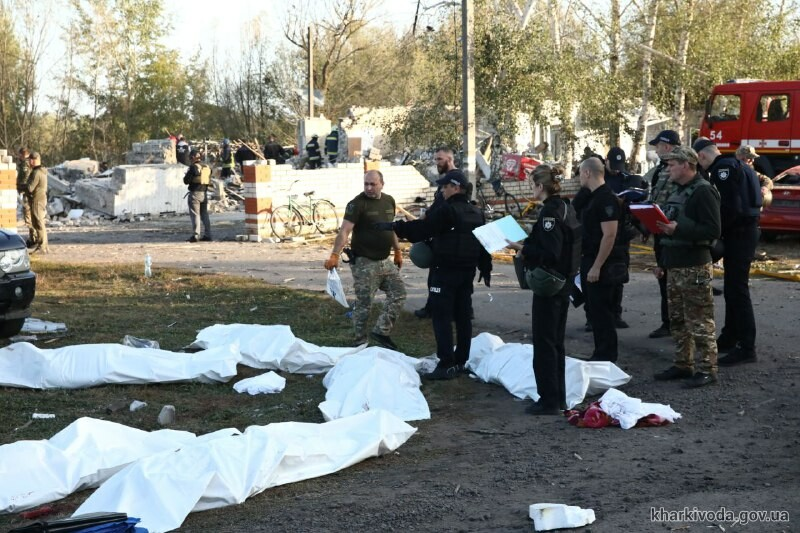
Bodies of Ukrainians killed in the Hroza missile attack

On 5 October 2023, Russian forces attacked the small village of Hroza with an Iskander missile, killing 59 people and wounding many more. It targeted a café that was hosting a memorial gathering for a local Ukrainian soldier. The strike killed a fifth of the village's inhabitants, including the fallen soldier's widow and son, and is one of the deadliest attacks on civilians during the war. Ukrainian authorities said the attack was clearly deliberate, and there was speculation that a spy gave Russian forces the location. Vasily Nebenzya, Russia's Permanent Representative to the UN, claimed that many of those attending the memorial were "Nazis."

=== November 2025 Kruhliakivka drone attack ===
On 4 November 2025, a pre-trial war-crimes investigation in Kharkiv was opened after a video recorded near Kruhliakivka appeared to show a Russian drone killing two civilians and their dog. According to the statement by Kharkiv's Regional Prosecutor's Office, the civilians were carrying a white flag as they were walking along the road when they were struck and killed by the drone.

=== November 2025 Berestyn missile attack ===
On 18 November 2025, regional officials said that a 17-year-old girl had been killed and nine others wounded in an overnight attack by Russian missiles on Berestyn.

=== January 2026 missile and drone strikes ===
On 2 January 2026, officials said that two people, preliminary information suggesting a mother and her three-year-old child, had been killed and around 28 people wounded after a Russian missile almost completely destroyed a residential apartment block.

On 13 January, officials said four people had been killed and six wounded in a Russian drone attack, which took place hours after the US had accused Russia of "dangerous and inexplicable escalation" of the war.

On 27 January, the Kharkiv Human Rights Protection Group said that a passenger train had been struck by Russian drones while travelling in Kharkiv Oblast, with one drone directly hitting a carriage and engulfing it in flames. At least five people were reported to have been killed in the attack, which Zelenskyy described as an "act of terrorism."

=== March 2026 missile and drone strikes ===
On 7 March 2026, regional officials said that ten people, including two children, had been killed after a Russian ballistic missile hit a five-story residential building; 15 people were also reported to have been injured, including three children. On 11 March, officials said that a Russian drone striking a civilian business resulted in two people being killed and five seriously injured.

=== May 2026 missile strike ===
On 4 May 2026, officials said that a Russian missile strike in the morning on Merefa killed seven people and wounded at least 36, including a two-year-old boy. Governor Syniehubov said that infrastructure was also damaged, including 10 houses and multiple shops, with Reuters footage showing a crater on the road. Regional prosecutors said that Russia appeared to have used an Iskander type of ballistic missile for the attack.

=== June 2026 missile and drone strikes ===
On 9 June 2026, a nighttime missile attack on Chuhuiv killed three people, including a 22-year old pregnant woman, also injuring six people and damaging civilian infrastructure according to regional prosecutors. In the city of Kharkiv, governor Syniehubov said that Russian drone attacks resulted 16 people seeking medical assistance.

=== July 2026 attacks ===
On 3 July 2026, regional head Syniehubov said that a Russian drone strike on a residential building in Lozova resulted in six people being injured, including three children. One of the children, a 10-year-old girl, died the next day in hospital after suffering severe burns.

On 17 July, Syniehubov said that Russian attacks had killed one person in Vysokyi, while injuring 14 people across the region.

=== August 2026 village attacks ===
On 18 August 2026, officials said a Russian ballistic missile strike killed ten civilians and wounded eight more in Pechenihy, completely destroying several homes.

=== Chuhuiv strike ===
On 5 September 2026, officials said that a Russian drone struck a residential house in Chuhuiv, killing three members of the same family, including an 11-year-old boy. A woman was also seriously wounded.

=== October 2026 strikes ===
Kharkiv officials reported several strikes on civilians in the beginning of October 2026, with Russia repeatedly striking Kharkiv with guided aerial bombs and drones. On 2 October, two women aged 66 and 80 were killed, while 42 people were injured, including three children. On 4 October, one person was reported to have been killed while eight were injured during strikes with jet-powered drones. On 5 October, guided aerial bomb strikes resulted in six people being killed and 59 wounded as dozens of civilian buildings were damaged. Among the wounded were three children, with one 11-year old girl being in serious condition.

On 19 October, officials said that six people were killed and 15 injured when a Russian drone struck a park in Nova Vodolaha where families were present, three of the killed victims being children. The Telegraph later reported that the Russian drone circled above the park before exploding and releasing shrapnel, and images showing a killed one-year old girl belted in a pram circulated widely. The attack followed accusations by Zelenskyy that the US was hampering Ukraine's air defence by introducing restrictions on drone interceptors and delaying intelligence warnings of ballistic missile strikes.

On 26 October, Terekhov said that Russian strikes damaging a high-rise apartment building and several homes resulted in two people being killed and four injured.

== Kherson Oblast ==
=== Shelling of Kherson ===
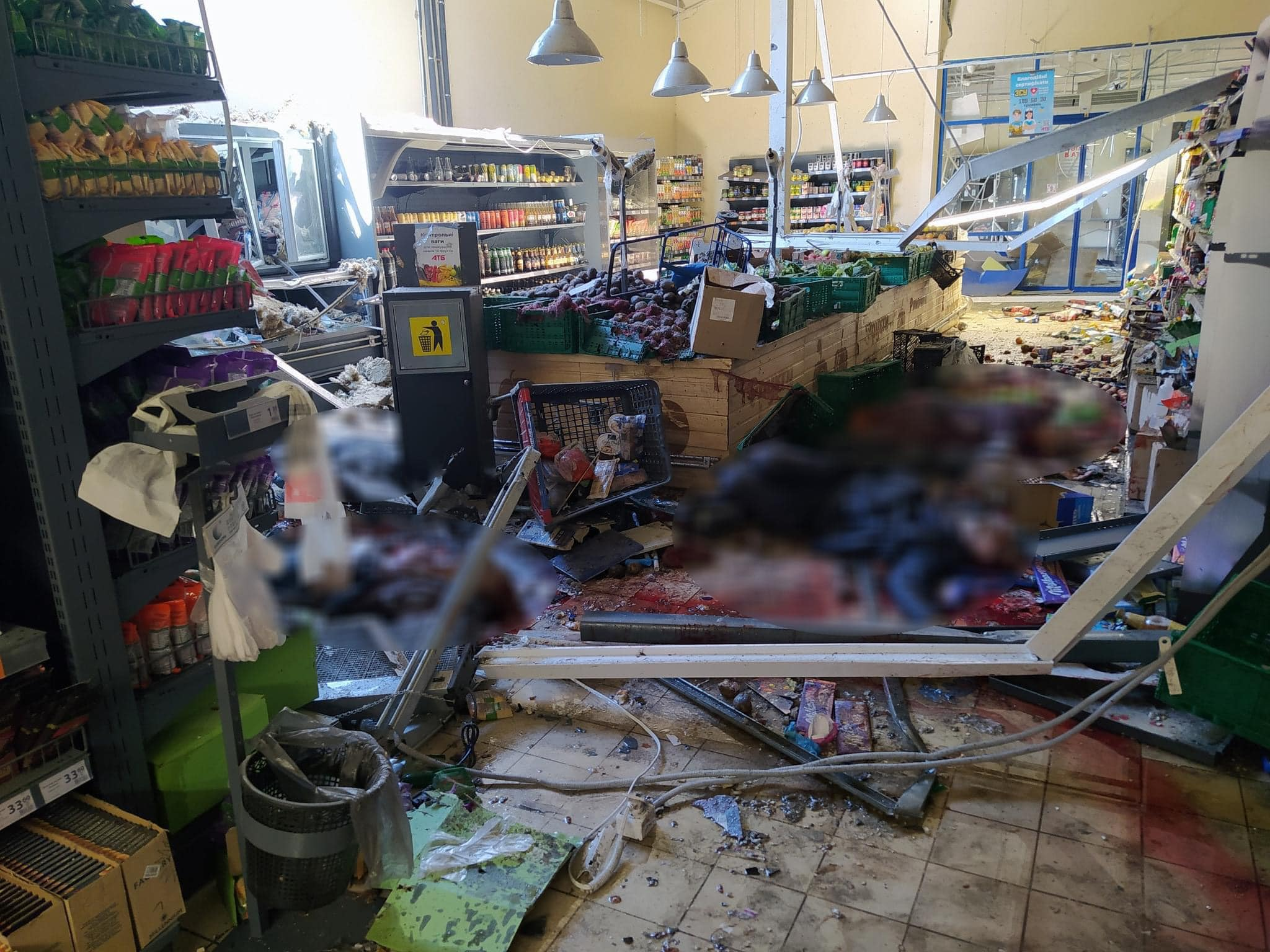
The dead in an ATB store on 3 May 2023

The city of Kherson was liberated from Russian occupation in November 2022. Russian troops continued to shell the city from the other side of the Dnipro River. On 3 May 2023, Russian artillery struck a supermarket, a train station, and residential buildings in Kherson, killing 23 people and wounding 46. Among those killed were three engineers repairing damage inflicted on the power grid in earlier Russian strikes.

On 3 December 2025, the rector of the Kherson National Technical University reported that a scientific staff member of the university, Tetiana Asauluk, had been killed by Russian shelling.

=== Deliberate drone attacks on Kherson civilians ===
In October 2024, Forbes reported that Russians were using drones to deliberately target civilians in Kherson and then "proudly" sharing the footage of the attacks on social media. Attacks being "shared and celebrated" including strikes on commuters, people at bus stops, and children playing in parks. This terror campaign has become known as the "Human Safari." One of the instances described as a "typical case" was a Ukrainian mother-of-two who was cycling home when a Russian drone spotted her and followed her until dropping a grenade, which injured her with shrapnel, leaving her unable to walk. Imagery of the attack was posted on a Russian Telegram channel with a winking face emoji and falsely describing her as a soldier.

In July 2025, local authorities said a one-year-old boy who was staying with his great-grandmother in Pravdyne had been struck by a Russian drone. The child died on the scene from injuries sustained from the explosion, and his grandmother was injured. The attack was part of a wider attack on Kherson, which wounded 17 people across the region.

Other than targeting individual civilians, Russian drones using a napalm-like mixture to start fires burning down entire neighbourhoods and scattering mines powerful enough to destroy a tire or blow a foot off have also been noted.

=== Gammalsvenskby white phosphorus attacks ===
The former village of Gammalsvenskby within Zmiivka has been the target of several Russian attacks making use of white phosphorus munitions to deliberately target civil infrastructure to cause as much devastation to the local civilian population as possible and have led to several civilian deaths. These attacks constitute direct terror bombings directly targeted at civilians, including the deliberate bombing of the local school, resulting in the death of one employee and leaving another severely wounded.

=== 2025 Christmas attack ===
On 26 December 2025, senators from the US Democratic and Republican parties condemned Russian attacks on Ukrainian civilians gathering to celebrate Christmas, with three people reported to be injured by shelling in central Kherson.

=== January 2026 shelling ===
According to Ukrainian officials, Russian shelling struck a bus in central Kherson on 30 January 2026, killing the driver and wounding five other civilians.

=== May 2026 playground strike ===
On 27 May 2026, local authorities said that Russian forces launched a multiple rocket launcher attack on Kherson, which struck a playground in the city and killed a father present with his two daughters ages three and six, who were both injured, the mother of the children as well as a 50-year-old man were also reported injured.

=== July 2026 attacks ===
On 17 July 2026, the Kherson military administration said that Russia had attacked 38 settlements, including the regional center, resulting in eight people being injured.

== Kyiv Oblast ==
=== Kyiv missile and drone strikes ===
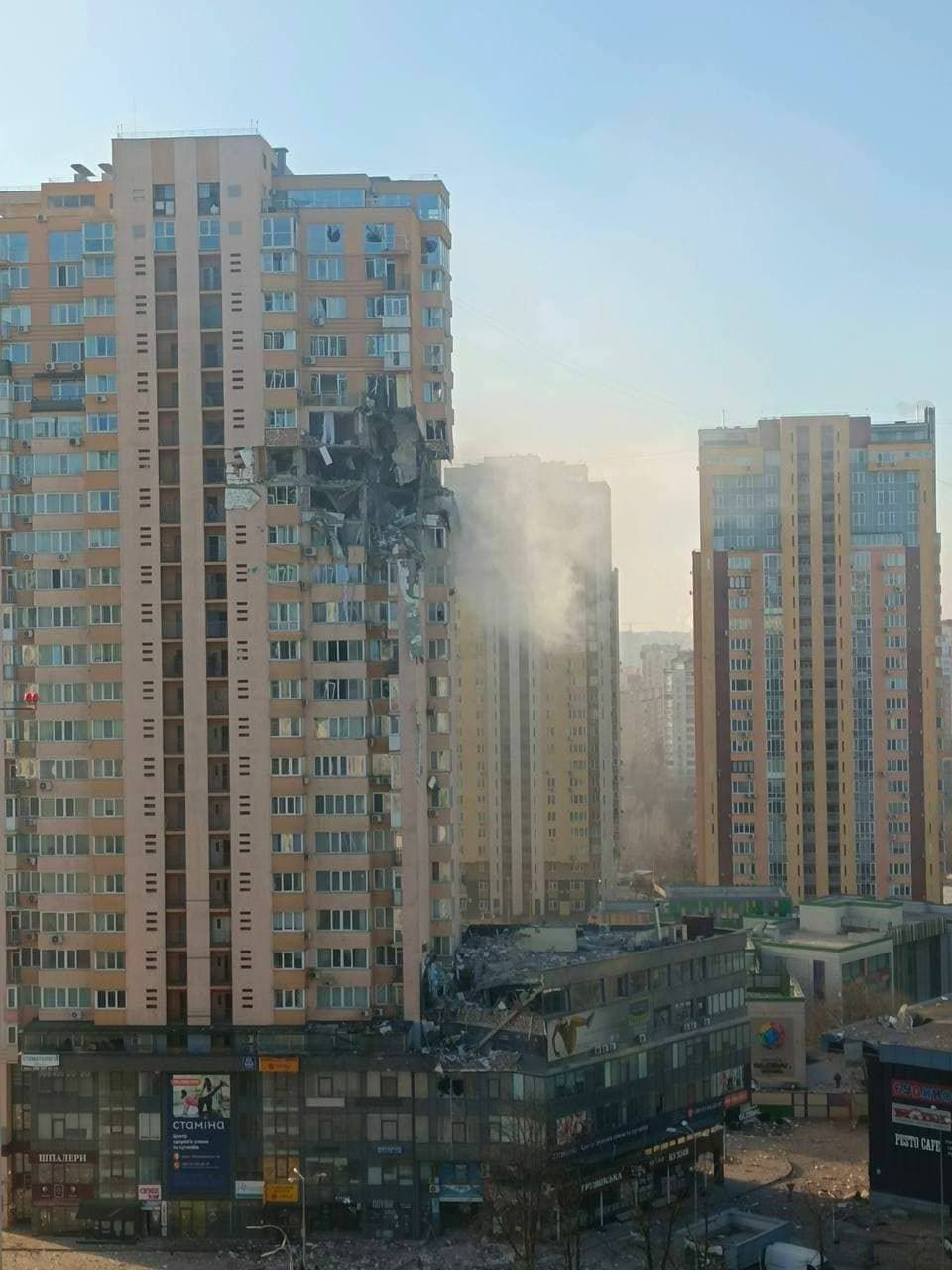
Residential building in Kyiv after being hit by a missile, 26 February 2022

Ukraine's capital, Kyiv, a city of some three million people, was among the first targets of Russian airstrikes. Kindergartens and orphanages were also shelled.

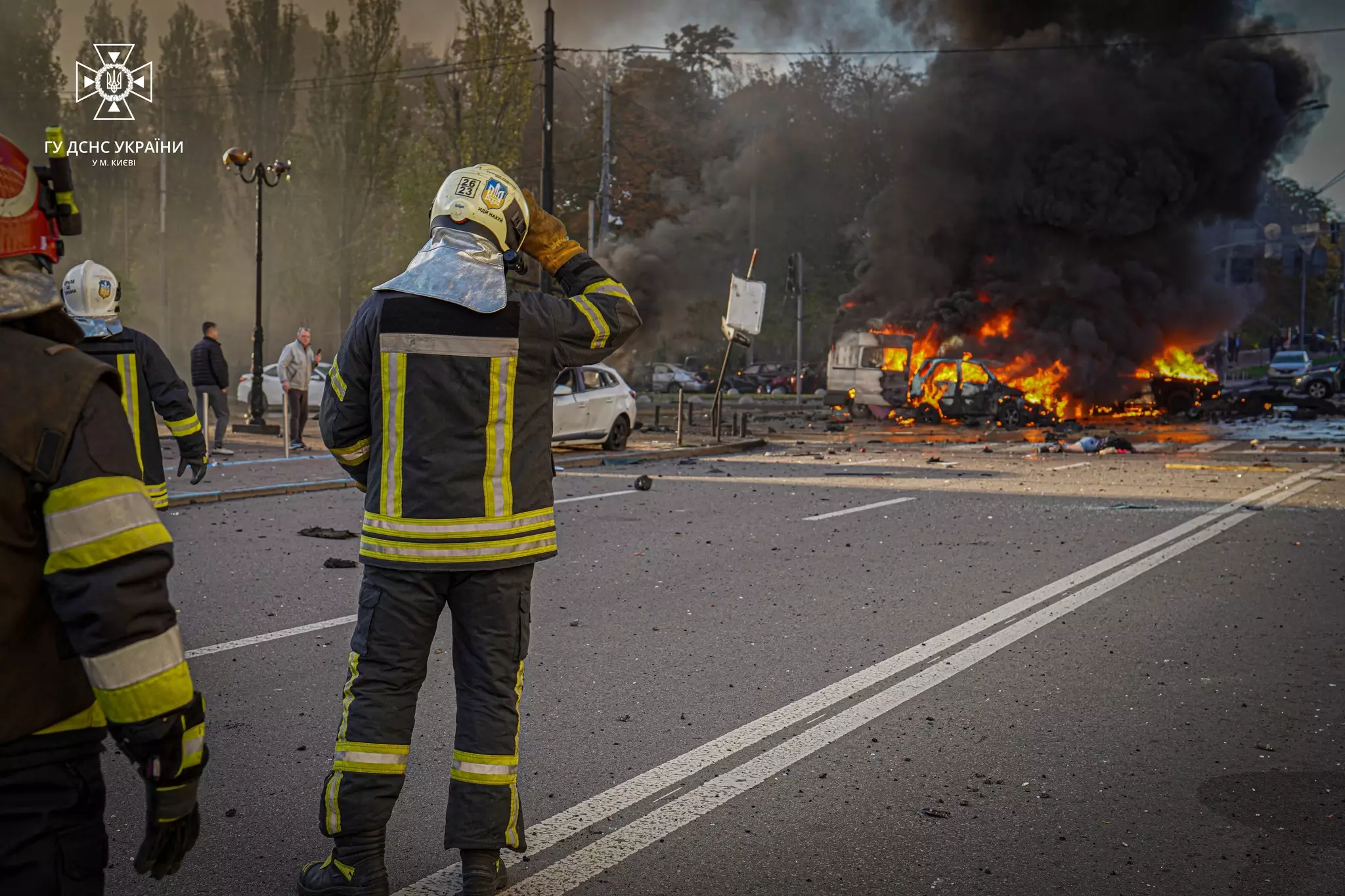
Dead civilian in Kyiv during the 10 October missile attack

On 10 October 2022, at 8:00 a.m. local time, several explosions rang out in the Shevchenkivskyi and Solomianskyi District of Kyiv. This was announced by the mayor of the capital, Vitali Klitschko. According to Anton Herashchenko, the adviser to the head of the Ministry of Internal Affairs, one of the rockets in Kyiv fell near the monument to Mykhailo Hrushevsky on Volodymyrskaya street. A missile struck the Kyiv Glass Bridge at 8:18 local time. The blast wave damaged the building and the roof of the central station Kyiv-Passenger. The Russian Armed Forces damaged Ukrainian cultural and educational buildings, including the Taras Shevchenko National University of Kyiv, the Khanenko Museum, and the Taras Shevchenko National Museum.

According to Rostyslav Smirnov, adviser to the Minister of Internal Affairs of Ukraine, at least eight people were killed and 24 were injured as a result of several hits in different places in Kyiv. Areas struck by missiles included nearby a children's playground. A fire broke out in six cars, and more than 15 cars were damaged. The Kyiv Metro's red line and the Teatralna–Golden Gate interchange node subway trains stopped running, and the underground tunnels became shelters for citizens. Smoke also rose over the CHP-6.

==== March 2025 drone attack ====
On 22 March 2025, Ukrainian officials said that a large-scale Russian drone attack on Kyiv killed three people, including a five-year-old child and her father, and injured eight people. According to the Ukrainian Air Force, Russia had launched 147 drones targeting several parts of the country. Debris from destroyed drones caused damage throughout the city, causing fires in high-rise apartment buildings. The attack happened less than a week after Russia announced a "partial 30-day ceasefire" amid a US push for a peace deal.

==== April 2025 joint missile and drone barrage ====
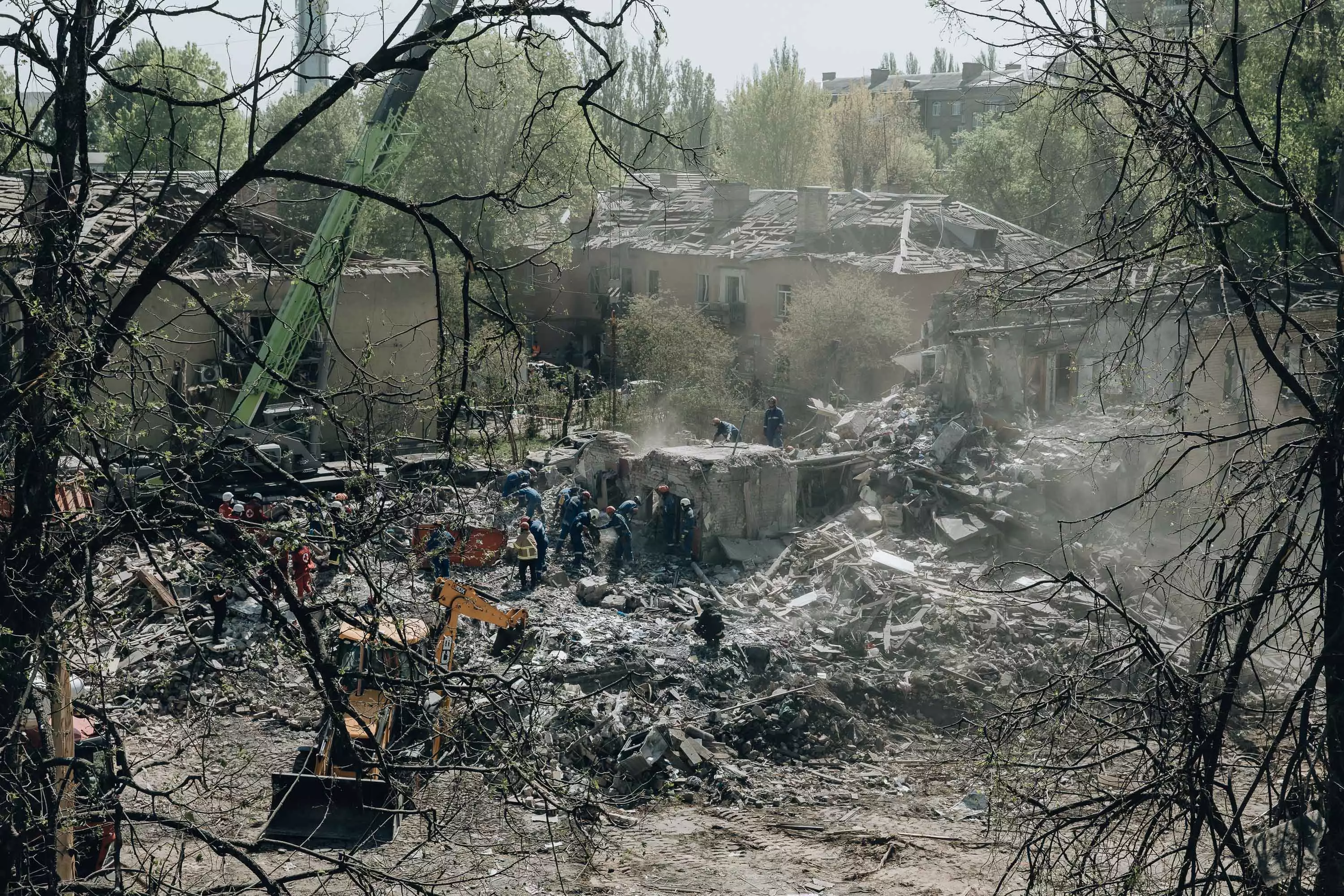
Destroyed apartment building in Kyiv, 24 April 2025. The Russian airstrikes killed 12 people.

On 24 April 2025, Russia struck Kyiv for an hour with both missiles and drones, killing at least 12 people and wounding approximately 90 people. The strikes began around 1 AM and hit at least five neighborhoods, causing major damage to residential buildings. The Associated Press described the attack as the deadliest attack on Kyiv since July, and it drew criticism of Putin by US President Trump, who the AP described as "reluctant to criticize the Kremlin." Following the attack, also carried out amid US-led peace efforts, Trump said the attack was "bad timing" and told Putin to "stop."

==== May 2025 air attack ====
In May 2025, Russia launched a three-day-long wave of drone and missile attacks on Ukraine, with the primary target being Kyiv. The attack started on 24 May and involved hundreds of drones and dozens of missiles and was described by Reuters as the war's largest air attack on Ukraine up until that point. According to officials, no deaths were reported in Kyiv, but at least 15 people were injured in the city, and apartment buildings were damaged. At least 12 people were killed in the attack, including four people in the region around Kyiv and three children in Zhytomyr. The attack started hours after Russia and Ukraine began a significant prisoner exchange, seen as a first step to a ceasefire between the countries.

==== June 2025 strikes ====
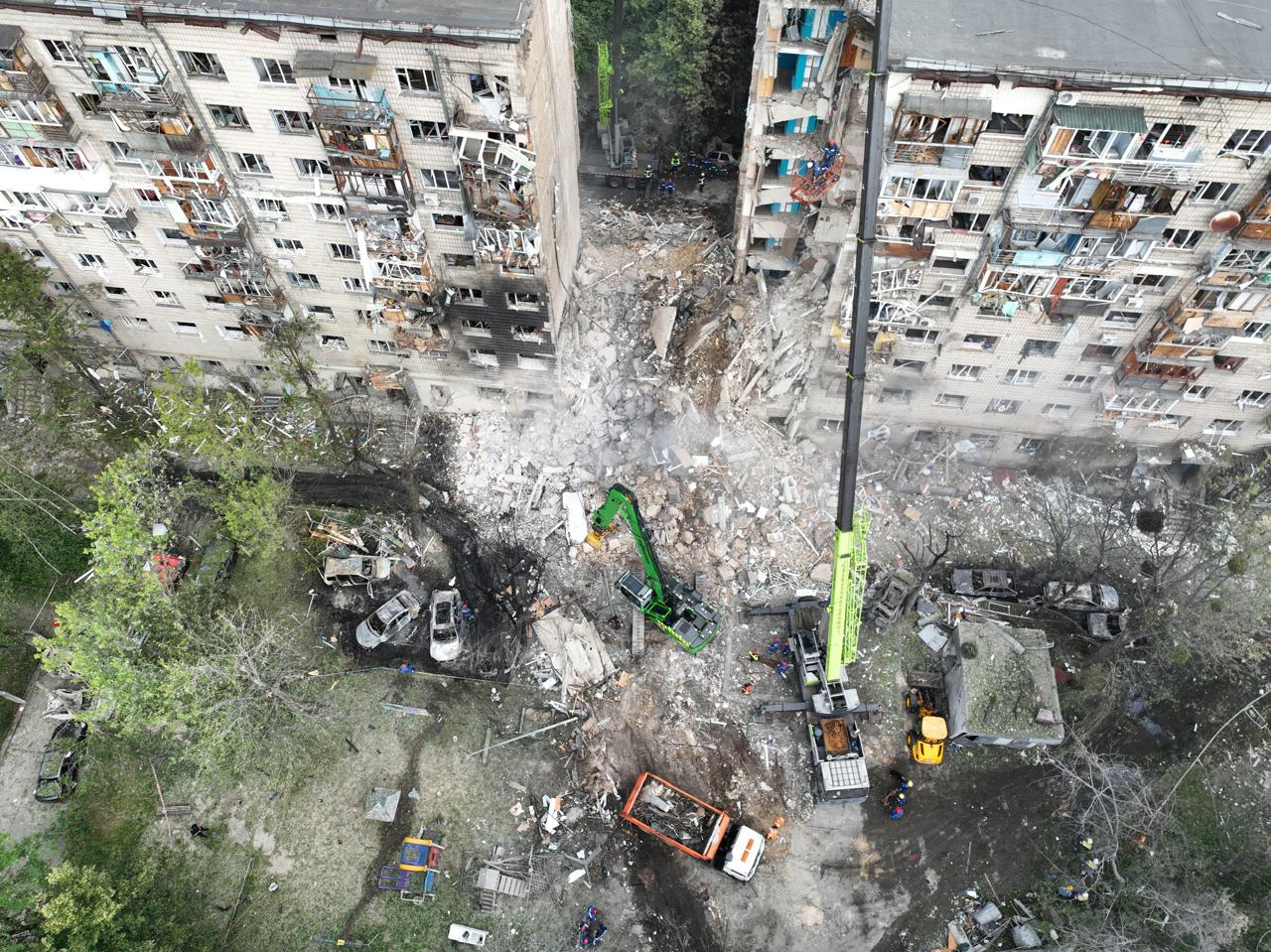
Destroyed apartment building in Kyiv on 17 June 2025. The Russian airstrike killed 28 people.

On 10 June 2025, officials said that Russia launched one of its largest strikes on Kyiv, causing widespread damage in seven out of ten of the city's districts and injuring four people. A week later, Russia again launched a sustained missile and drone bombardment on the city early on 17 June; the attack caused the demolishing of a nine-story apartment building, killing 28 people and injuring over 100.

==== July 2025 strikes ====
On 10 July 2025, Interior Minister Ihor Klymenko confirmed that two women had been killed in Kyiv following Russian drone strikes hitting eight districts in the city. The mayor, Klitschko, said that a primary healthcare center in the Podilskyi District was almost completely destroyed in the attack.

On 31 July, at least 28 people were killed by a barrage of Russian missiles and drones striking several districts across Kyiv. Ukrainian officials said that three children, the youngest three years old, were among the dead. 159 people were also reported to have been wounded in the attack, which collapsed an apartment block. Several other buildings were damaged, including a hospital ward for children in Shevchenkivskyi, which was damaged by a shockwave.

==== August 2025 strikes on civilians, EU mission and British Council ====
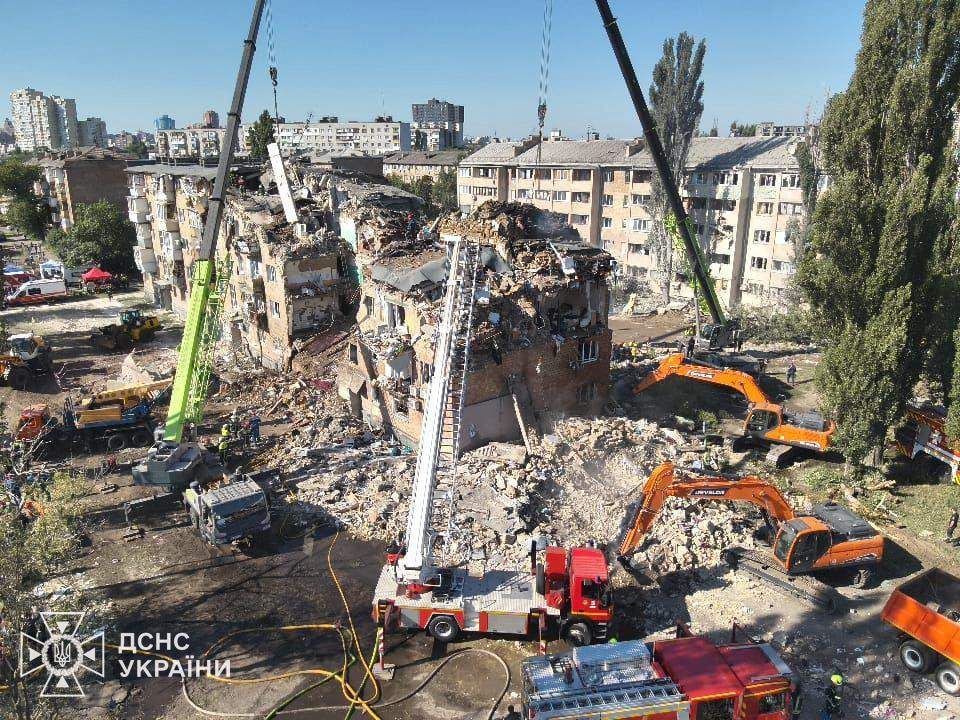
Destroyed apartment building after Russian airstrikes on 28 August 2025, which killed 25 people

On 28 August 2025, the Russian Armed Forces launched nearly 600 drones and more than 30 ballistic and cruise missiles at Kyiv, Ukraine, striking multiple residential areas, killing 23 people, including four children, and wounding dozens more. A five-story residential building was destroyed, and the EU mission and nearby British Council were damaged. Officials said three of the children killed were aged two, 14, and 17. Several other youngsters were wounded.

==== October 2025 drone and missile attacks ====
On 10 October 2025, Ukrainian authorities said that Russia targeted civilian and energy infrastructure in Kyiv with drones and missiles, wounding 20 people, damaging residential buildings, and causing blackouts.

On 26 October, three people were killed and 29 wounded after Russian drones struck residential buildings in the city. State Emergency Services said that a 19-year-old woman along with her mother were among the dead, while seven children were among the injured, with victims having to be rescued out of the upper floors of a nine-story apartment block after a fire broke out in the building.

==== November 2025 attack ====
In November 2025, state emergency services said that two people had been killed and 38 wounded in a Russian overnight attack, which also cut power to half the city, leaving at least 500,000 people without electricity.

==== January 2026 strikes ====
On 5 January 2026, authorities said Russia had struck a private medical facility in Kyiv, killing one patient and wounding three others, as well as causing night-time evacuations in freezing temperatures. The same air attack also killed a man in his 70s in Fastiv.

On 8 January, four people were killed and 25 injured in Kyiv as Russia launched a massive overnight strike across the country, including a oreshnik ballistic missile, which, according to Ukrainian authorities, had struck Lviv.

==== April 2026 strikes ====
On 3 April 2026, Mykola Kalashnyk, the head of the regional military administration, said that one person had been killed and at least eight wounded in Russian strikes on Bucha, Fastiv, and Obukhiv. A veterinary clinic close to Kyiv was also struck, killing around 20 animals. On 16 April, Klitschko said that a Russian drone and missile attack resulted in the deaths of two people in Kyiv, a 12-year-old boy and a 35-year-old woman, with at least 10 people being wounded.

==== May 2026 strikes ====
Russia launched heavy attacks on Ukraine in May 2026. On 14 May, an apartment block was destroyed in Kyiv during heavy Russian bombardment that had been going on since the day before, resulting in the deaths of 24 people, including three children.

On 24 May, Ukrainian officials described a massive Russian attack on Kyiv and the surrounding region, including the use of a ″oreshnik″ hypersonic ballistic missile, which Zelenskyy said hit the city of Bila Tserkva. Officials reported that the attack resulted in four deaths and around 100 injuries, and Kyiv mayor Klitschko said that damage had been recorded in every district of the city, including starting a fire in a school.

==== June 2026 strikes ====
On 2 June 2026, a large-scale attack of drones and cruise missiles killed 22 (6 in Kyiv & 16 in Dnipro) and injured over 100 according to Ukrainian authorities. More than 600 drones and dozens of missiles hit key civilian infrastructure, including a medical facility and residential buildings, and damaged a kindergarten.

===== 14 June bombardment and damage of UNESCO monastery =====
On 14, local authorities said that a large Russian attack on Kyiv using drones and missiles resulted in the death of at least five people while injuring more than 30 people. During the attack, the 11th century UNESCO-listed Kyiv Pechersk Lavra, which in 2023 was added to the World Heritage in Danger list due to ″the threat of destruction the Russian offensive poses″, was engulfed in flames. Kyiv mayor Klitschko said that around 140,000 households were also left without electricity in the northern part of the city as a result of the attack.

==== July 2026 large-scale attacks on Kyiv ====
On 2 July 2026, several media outlets reported on a massive attack on Kyiv by Russia, with CNN saying that Russia targeted residential buildings with weapons including ballistic missiles, jet-powered drones and loitering munitions, killing at least 30 people. Timur Tkachenko, head of Kyiv's military administration, also said 91 people were injured. As a result of the attack, Kyiv's metro authorities said that 52,500 people, including 4,500 children, spent the night sheltering in underground stations.

Days later, Russia launched another missile and drone attack on the city and surrounding region, killing at least 27 people, including an entire family that were pulled out of the rubble of a residential building, while injuring dozens more according to officials. According to Ukraine's Air Force, none of the ballistic missiles Russia launched were shot down by air defense, which Zelenskyy said was because of an ″insufficient supply of interceptor missiles″.

On 30 July, local authorities said the city was targeted with ballistic missiles, killing one person and wounding two, while the metro reported more than 56,000 people sheltering in subway stations overnight.

==== August 2026 continued ballistic missile strikes ====
On 1 August 2026, Zelenskyy said that at least nine people were killed and dozens injured in a Russian ballistic missile attack. According to the emergency services, two children were among the injured in the Darnytskyi District. The foreign ministry of Lithuania also said that a missile landed near the Lithuanian embassy, causing damage and scattering debris on its compound.

On 4 August, Ukrainian officials said that at least 17 people had been killed and dozens injured in another Russian ballistic missile attack on Kyiv and its suburbs, with Zelenskyy again highlighting Ukraine's lack of interceptor missiles to defend against Russian attacks.

On 21 August, officials said that 16 people had been killed and 33 injured in what The Guardian described as ″one of the most intense aerial attacks″ on Kyiv. Mayor Klitschko said that damaged buildings included a children's medical centre, a school, and homes, while the Ukrainian Air Force said Russia used various hypersonic and ballistic missiles, including North Korean KN-23 ballistic missiles and drones.

On 29 August, Ukrainian officials said a Russian drone strike on a warehouse in the village Myla killed at least 37 people and injured over 40. The resulting explosions impacted residential buildings and a care home, and Zelenskyy announced that a criminal investigation into official negligence was underway as ammunition may have been stored in the warehouse, which would be against Ukraine's regulations.

==== September 2026 drone swarms as Russian battlefield progress slows ====
On 1 September 2026, authorities reported that Russian attacks, ongoing for the sixth straight day, had killed 12 people and wounded ″many more″ in Kyiv and the surrounding region. Reuters said Russia had escalated its air attacks recently amidst slowing progress on the battlefield, sending swarms of drones into the region day and night.

On 9 September, Kyiv authorities said that a woman had been killed and nine people wounded as Russian drones repeatedly targeted the city during the day, striking several residential buildings.

On 20 September, regional authorities said that four people had been killed, including a mother and her two children who were three-years old, while another child was killed in a separate drone strike. One person was also reported injured.

On 23 September, Kyiv authorities reported that two people were killed and 22 injured in further Russian drone attacks, with one drone striking near the Kyiv National University of Construction and Architecture, though no students or staff were reported to have been hurt.

On 30 September, the Kyiv Post reported that three people had been killed, including a child, and eight wounded in continued Russian drone attacks on the city.

==== October 2026 drone and missile strikes ====
On 1 October 2026, Mayor Klitschko said a Russian drone had struck a school in the Solomianskyi district. At the time of the strike, the children and teachers in the school were in a shelter, avoiding casualties. Kyiv authorities further reported drone attacks on the same day resulting in fires breaking out in an apartment building and a warehouse, resulting in one person being injured.

On 8 October, officials said that a Russian missile attack killed 22 people, including five children, while injuring more than 50 people as 30 flats were destroyed. Several residential buildings and a youth center were damaged.

On 20 October, officials said that a Russian drone struck early morning commuter traffic in the Holosiivskyi District, killing at least three people and injuring four.

=== Bombing of Borodianka ===
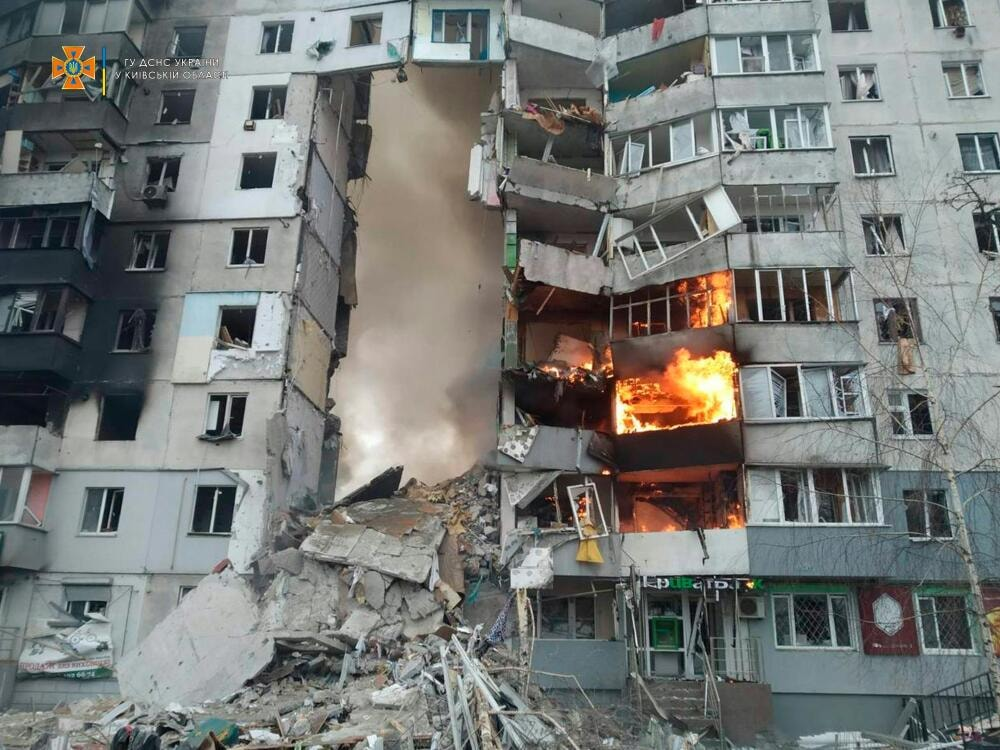
Destroyed residential buildings in Borodianka, March 2022

As Russian forces fought in and near Kyiv, Borodianka, which is on a strategically important road, was targeted by numerous Russian airstrikes. Most of the buildings in the town were destroyed, including almost all of its main street. Russian bombs struck the centers of buildings and caused them to collapse while the frames remained standing. Many civilians were also reportedly killed by cluster munitions during the attacks. Oleksiy Reznikov, minister of defense, said many residents were buried alive by airstrikes and lay dying for up to a week. Some residents hid in caves for 38 days.

Only a few hundred residents remained in Borodianka by the time the Russians withdrew, with roughly 90% of residents having fled, and an unknown number dead in the rubble. Borodianka's mayor estimated at least 200 dead. Agence France-Presse arrived in Borodianka on 5 April. The AFP did not see any bodies but reported widespread destruction and that some homes "simply no longer existed." The human death toll remained unclear: one resident reported that he knew of at least five civilians killed, but that others were beneath the rubble and that no one had yet attempted to extricate them. According to Europe 1, ten days after the Russian army had left, firefighters were still working to recover bodies from the rubble in order to bury them with dignity. Their work was complicated by the risk of other buildings collapsing. More bodies were discovered daily. Local morgues were overwhelmed, and corpses had to be transported 100 kilometres or more.

=== Irpin refugee column shelling ===
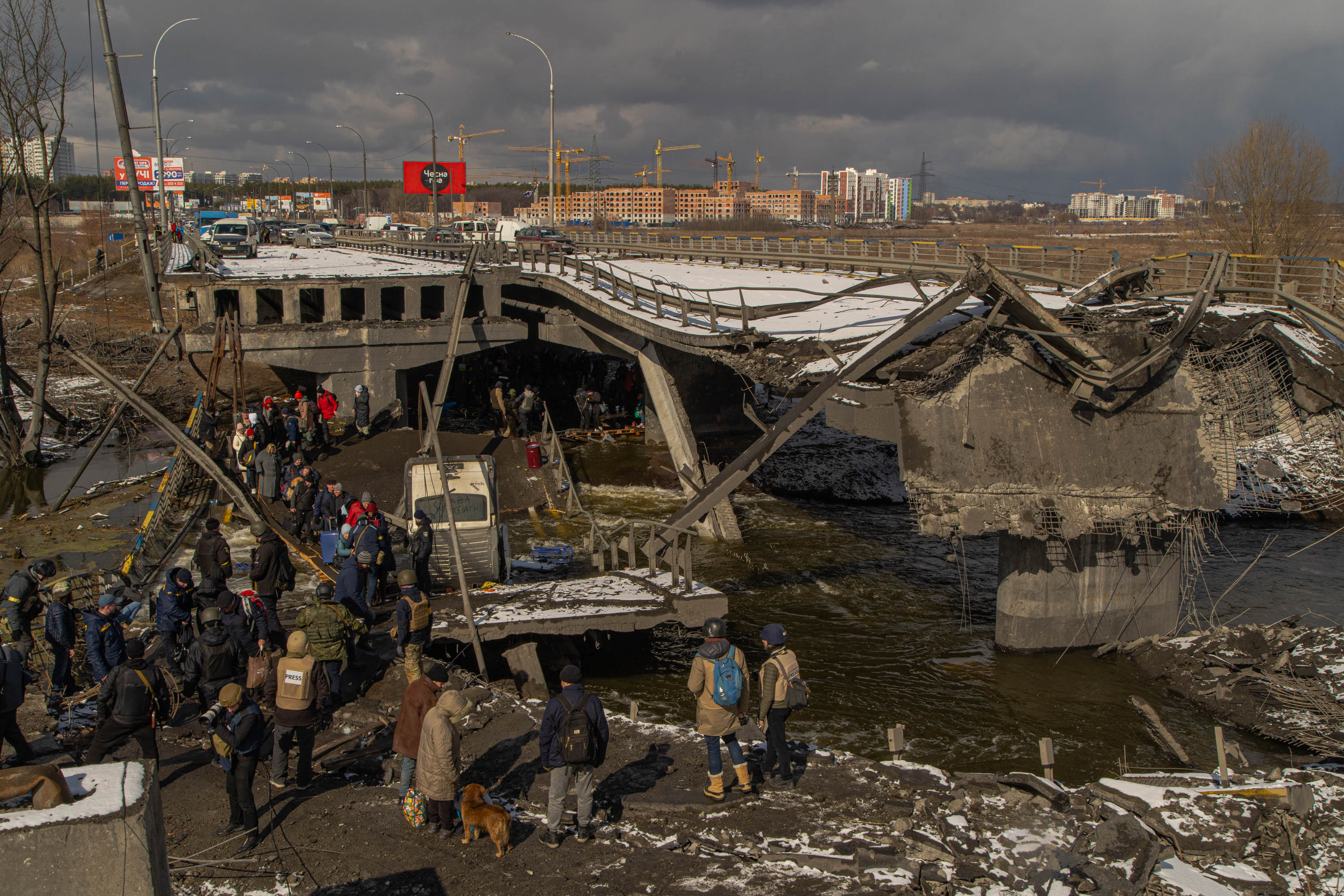
Civilians fleeing over the Irpin River bridge, March 2022

On 6 March 2022, from 9:30 a.m. until 2 p.m. local time, the Russian Armed Forces repeatedly shelled an intersection in Irpin that hundreds of civilians were using to escape to Kyiv while a Ukrainian artillery position was located nearby. They killed at least eight Ukrainian civilians (including 2 children). Human Rights Watch alleged the Russian army carried out an "unlawful, indiscriminate, and disproportionate attack." The incident was part of an assault on Irpin.

On that day, there were hundreds of civilians at the intersection on the P30 road, near the St. George's Ukrainian Orthodox Church, just south of a bridge that the Ukrainian army had destroyed to hinder the Russian invasion. The civilians were fleeing the Russian army's advance from Irpin towards Kyiv. In the intersection near the bridge were a dozen Ukrainian soldiers, some helping the civilians carry their luggage and children. The Ukrainian artillery was firing mortar rounds from a position about 180 metres (590 ft) away. No agreements had been reached between the parties about a temporary ceasefire or humanitarian corridor. Journalists of The New York Times and freelance journalists on the scene report that for several hours the Russian army bombarded the intersection that the civilians were using to flee. The Russians fired explosive projectiles into the area, with projectiles hitting the intersection or the surrounding area every 10 minutes, Among the victims were a group of four, including two children, who were killed by a mortar strike.

According to Human Rights Watch, it is possible that the projectiles were "observed" by the Russians, who would then know where they were landing and could easily have adjusted the aim away from the intersection. Instead, they engaged in prolonged shelling of the intersection being used by civilians, which indicates "potential recklessness or deliberateness" on their part. The repeated nature of the attacks suggests that Russian forces "violated their obligations under international humanitarian law not to conduct indiscriminate or disproportionate attacks that harm civilians and failed to take all feasible measures to avoid civilian casualties." The human rights organisation also stated that the Ukrainian forces "have an obligation to take all feasible precautions to avoid or minimize civilian harm," such as refraining from engaging in combat in populated areas.

=== Bucha massacre ===
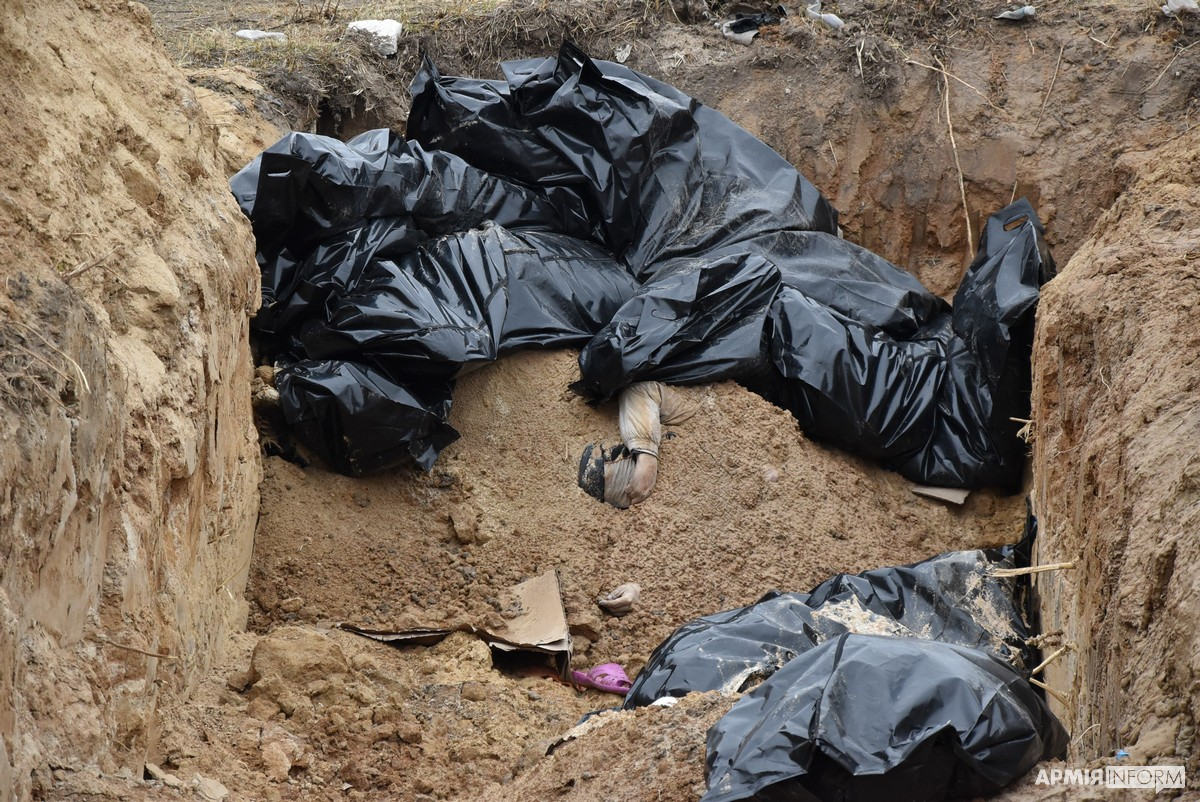
Victims of the Bucha massacre

Ukrainian forensic investigations on the Bucha massacre revealed that dozens of civilians had been killed by metal darts ("fléchettes") of a kind used by the Russian army. Bodies from the Bucha-Irpin region showed lesions from small nail-like objects contained in tank or field gun shells. According to witnesses, Russian artillery fired shells that spread fléchettes a few days before retreating from the area at the end of March. While fléchettes are not prohibited under international law, their use in residential areas may qualify as the war crime of indiscriminate attack. The spokesperson for the Ukrainian Ground Forces stated that Ukraine's military does not use shells with fléchettes.

According to Oleg Tkalenko, deputy chief prosecutor of the Kyiv Oblast, forensic experts found fragments of cluster munitions in bodies from mass graves in Bucha after the retreat of Russian troops. The exact number of civilians killed specifically due to the use of cluster munitions in the village was unknown, but at least 8 out of about 500 of those found were reportedly killed by their use. The Guardian later confirmed the use of RBK-500 cluster munitions with PTAB-submunitions and cluster missiles fired by the BM-30 Smerch in Bucha. The mayor of the city, Anatoly Fedoruk, stated that "Bucha was turned into a Chechen safari, where land mines were used against civilians." Cluster munition fragments were also found in the nearby city of Hostomel, many of them in animal carcasses.

== Khmelnytskyi Oblast ==
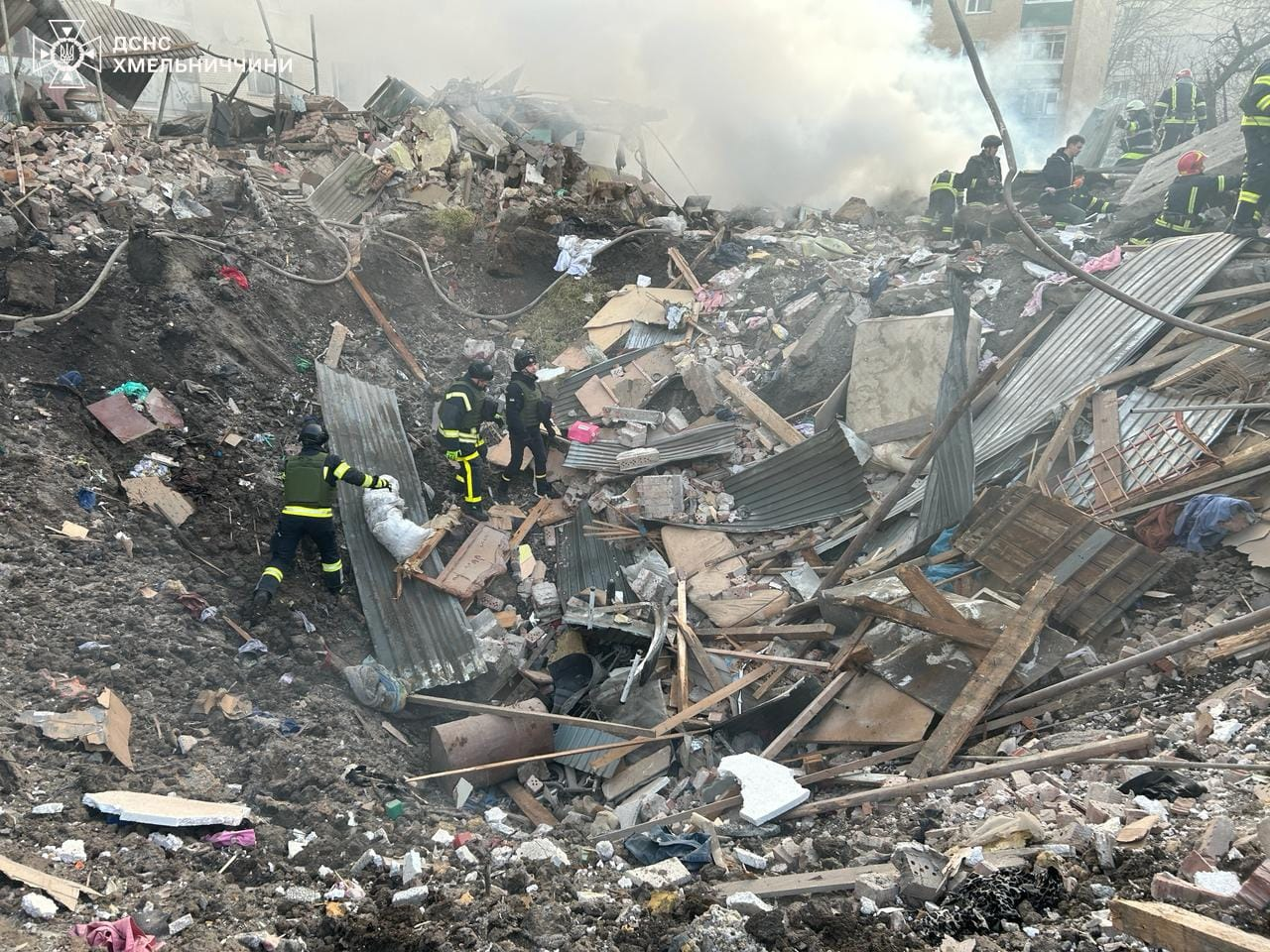
Destruction in Khmelnytskyi after Russian attack on 22 March 2024

On 9 July 2025, Ukrainian officials said one civilian in Khmelnytskyi suffered fatal injuries from the falling debris of a Shahed drone. Ukraine's Air Force said that it was part of an aerial assault consisting of 728 drones and 13 missiles, the largest drone attack launched in the war up to that date. It was launched hours after US President Trump pledged more military support for Ukraine and criticized Putin over peace talks.

== Luhansk Oblast ==
=== Bilohorivka school bombing ===
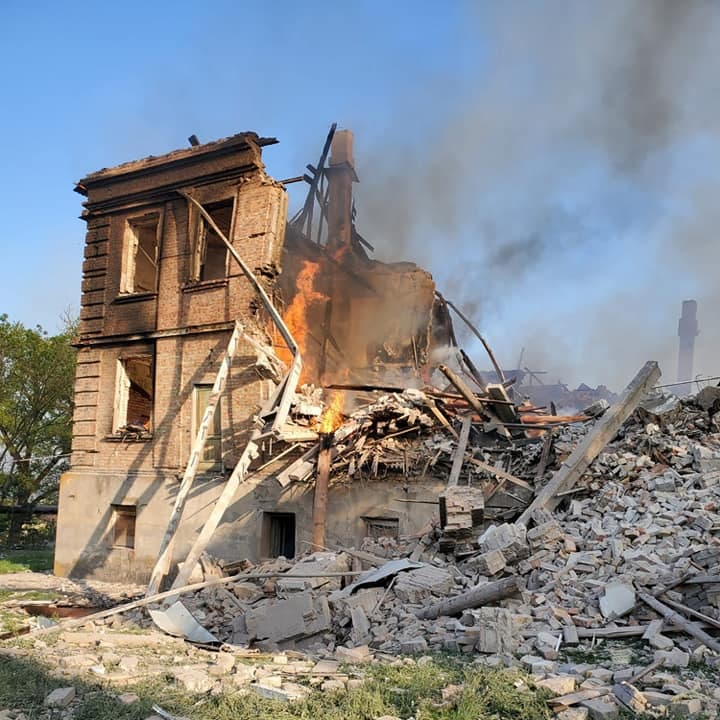
Aftermath of the Bilohorivka school bombing

On 7 May 2022, Russian forces bombed a school in Bilohorivka where about ninety people were seeking shelter from the ongoing fighting during the Battle of Sievierodonetsk. The building caught on fire and trapped large numbers of people inside. At least 30 people were rescued. Two people were confirmed to have been killed, but Governor of Luhansk Oblast Serhiy Haidai said that the 60 remaining people were believed to have been killed.

The attack was condemned by the Ukrainian Foreign Ministry and UN Secretary-General Antonio Guterres, who said he was "appalled" by the attack. He also reminded that "civilians and civilian infrastructure must always be spared in times of war." Liz Truss, the British foreign secretary, said that she was "horrified" and described the attack as constituting war crimes.

=== Stara Krasnianka care home attack ===
On 7 March 2022, the Ukrainian armed forces set up a firing position at a care house in the village of Stara Krasnianka, near Kreminna, Luhansk Oblast, due to the house's strategic location, with the evacuation reportedly impossible due to mining. On 9 March, the Ukrainian forces based at the care house engaged in a first exchange of fire with Russian-affiliated armed groups without casualties among the civilian residents. On 11 March 2022, pro-Russian separatist forces attacked the care house with heavy weapons while 71 patients with disabilities and 15 members of staff were still inside. A fire broke out and approximately fifty people died. A group of residents fled the house and ran into the forest until they were met five kilometers away by Russian-affiliated armed groups, who provided them with assistance. Ukraine officials accused the Russian forces of deliberately targeting a medical facility and forcefully deporting the survivors. On 29 June, a report of the OHCHR, which didn't find "that Russia committed any war crimes." It doesn't say that Ukraine used human shields but "only expressed concern about allegations of this occurring." The report found that Ukrainian forces occupied the building before the attack; thus, care home patients were not the intendend target.

== Bombing of Lviv ==
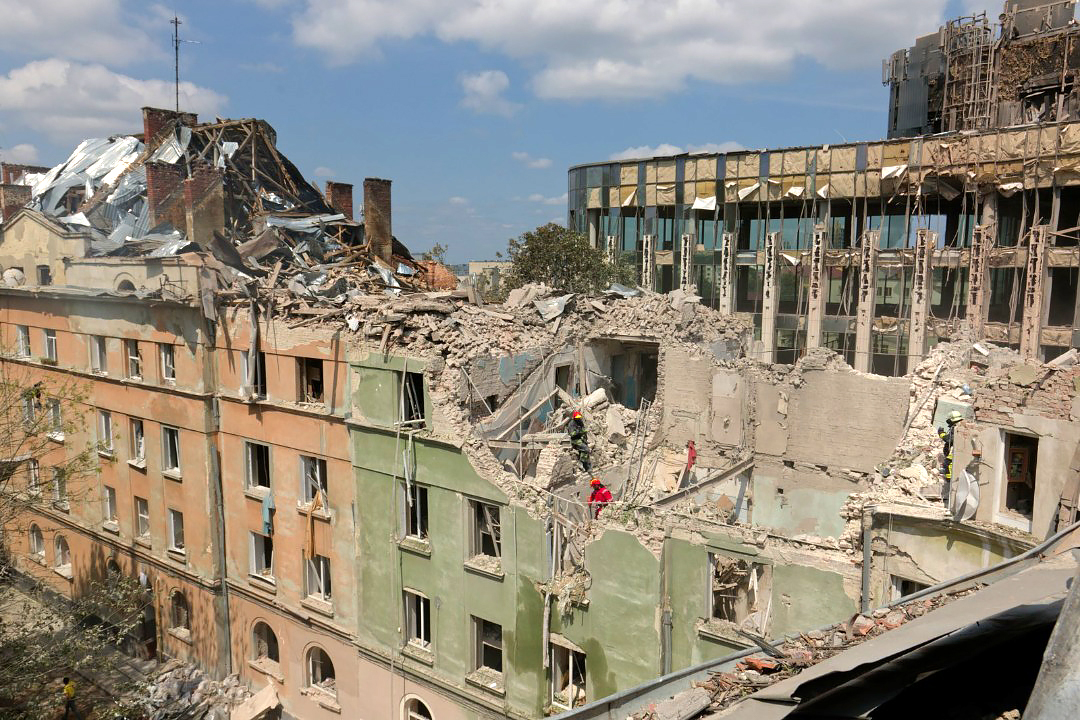
Aftermath of the Lviv missile strike, 6 July 2023

On 6 July 2023, Russian forces launched ten Kalibr cruise missiles at Lviv, in western Ukraine. One of the guided missiles hit an apartment block in a residential area, killing ten civilians, wounding almost fifty, and causing widespread damage. Most of the other missiles were shot down, but two struck Ukrainian military targets nearby. Human Rights Watch said the attack should be investigated as a war crime.

On 4 September 2024, Russian air attacks struck the historic centre of Lviv, a UNESCO World Heritage Site, killing civilians and damaging civilian infrastructure and buildings. Lviv mayor Andryi Sadovyi reported that seven people were killed, including four members of the same family, with a mother and her three children being killed in the attack, leaving only the father alive. 66 people required medical assistance, including 10 children. Local authorities said the attack damaged about 50 civilian objects, including homes, medical facilities and architectural landmarks.

On 21 August 2025, one person was killed and three were injured by Russian drone and missile strikes that damaged more than 20 civilian buildings, including a nursery and residential homes.

On 5 October 2025, officials said that the largest attack on the Lviv region since the beginning of the full-scale invasion had taken place overnight by Russian drones and missiles. According to Lviv's regional head Maksym Kozytskyi, it involved around 163 missiles and drones, targeting civilian infrastructure like residential buildings and hospitals. The attack killed a 15-year-old-girl, as well as three of her family members in the village of Lapaivka, injuring three more people.

On 24 March 2026, officials said that at least 13 people had been injured in a Russian daytime drone attack on the city, which damaged a residential building close to the 17th century St. Andrew's Church, a UNESCO World Heritage Site.

On 30 July 2026, the Lviv regional military administration said that a cruise missile attack had killed one person and wounded over 30, including children aged six, 13 and 15.

== Bombing of Mykolaiv ==
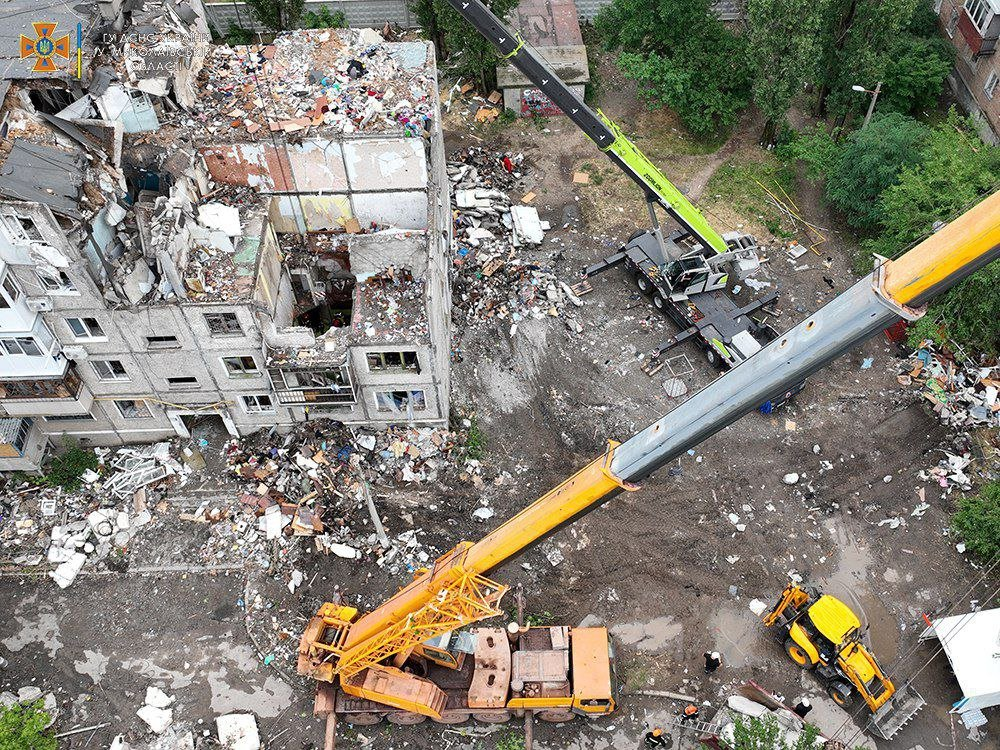
Aftermath of Russian rocket strike on Mykolaiv, 29 June 2022, which killed eight people

Cluster munitions were repeatedly used also on Mykolaiv during separate attacks on 7, 11 and 13 March 2022, causing civilian casualties and extensive destruction of non-military objects. In the 13 March attack nine civilians, including two children, were killed and 13 injured while waiting in line on the street at a cash machine. The explosions also damaged houses and civilian buildings. Human Rights Watch analysed the incident and found that the Russian forces used Smerch and Uragan cluster munition on densely populated areas. Due to the inherently indiscriminate nature of cluster munitions, Human Rights Watch described their use in Mykolaiv as a possible Russian war crime.

On 28 June 2022, Russian shelling damaged the Central City Stadium. On the following day, a Russian rocket strike hit a 5-story residential building, killing at least 8 people and injuring 6. On 15 July, the two largest universities of the city were struck by missiles: Admiral Makarov National University of Shipbuilding and the Mykolaiv National University. On 29 July, Russian forces bombed a bus stop. 5 were killed and 7 were injured.

== Odesa Oblast ==
=== Bombing of Odesa ===
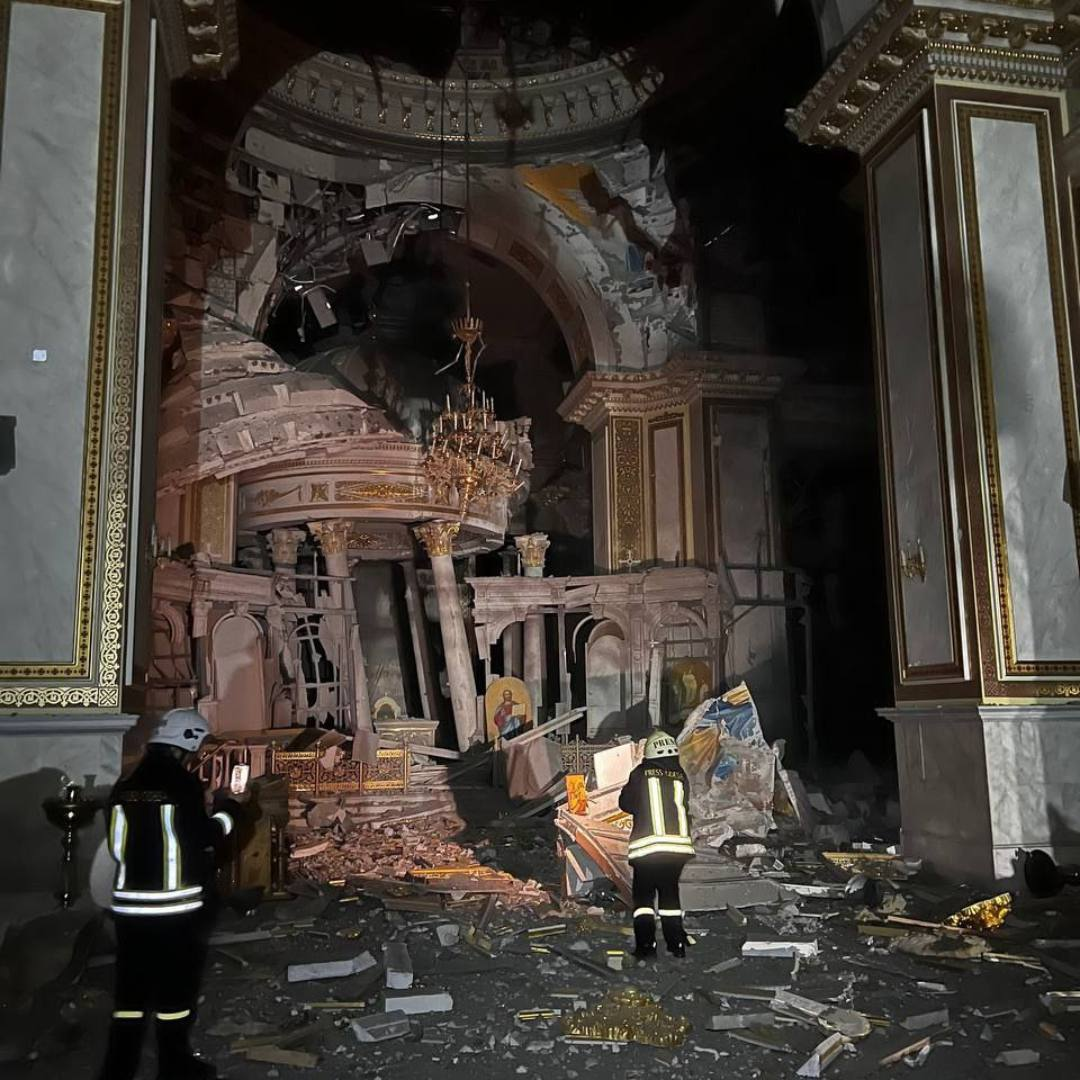
Damage to the Transfiguration Cathedral in Odesa from a Russian missile strike on 23 July 2023

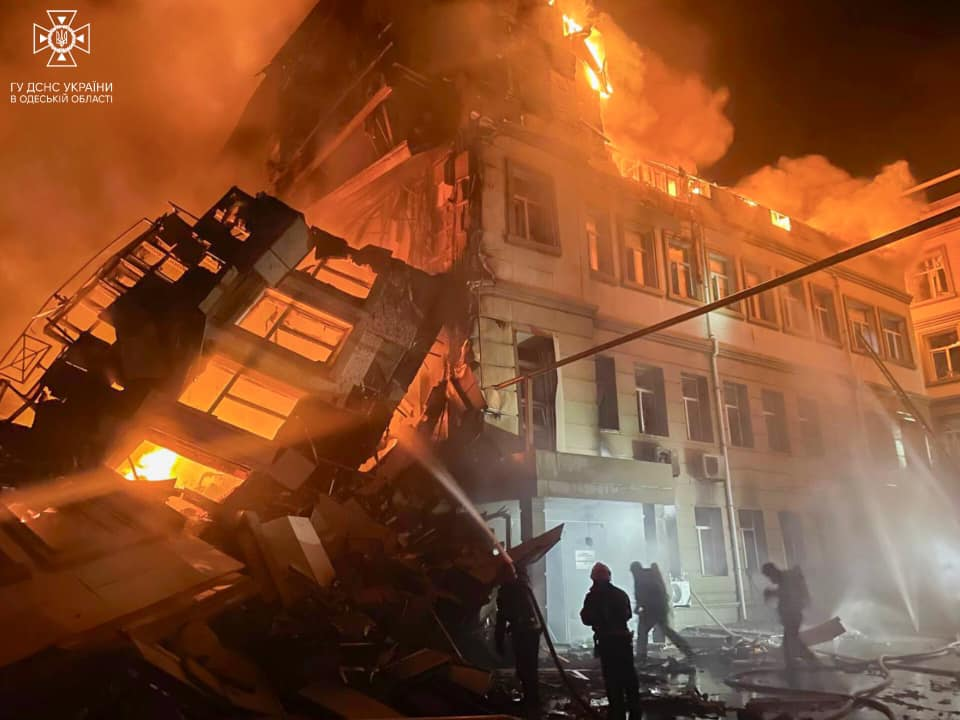
Damage in Odesa from a Russian airstrike on 20 July 2023

On 3 March 2022, the nearby villages of Zatoka and Bilenke were shelled, killing at least one civilian in Bilenke. On 23 April, a Russian missile strike hit two residential buildings. killing eight civilians and wounding 18 or 20, according to Ukraine. One missile that struck a residential building killed a three-month-old baby, the mother, and the baby's maternal grandmother. On 9 May, Russia fired three Kinzhal missiles to Odesa Oblast. At that time, President of the European Council Charles Michel and Prime Minister of Ukraine Denys Shmyhal were in Odesa and had to hide in a bomb shelter. In the evening of the same day, Russian troops fired rockets at three warehouses in Odesa and a shopping centre in the village of Fontanka near the city. One person was killed and two were injured in the warehouses. Three people were also injured in the mall.

On 18 November 2024, Russia struck residential buildings and civilian infrastructure in Odesa, resulting in 10 deaths and 39 injuries, including a child, according to the head of the Odesa Regional Military Administration.

On 10 June 2025, Russian drones struck medical facilities, including a maternity ward, as well as residential buildings, with officials saying the attacks resulted in two people dying and 13 being injured.

On 22 July 2025, Odesa was targeted by more than 10 drones according to the Southern Air Command. The attack resulted in damaged civilian infrastructure and one woman sustaining a head injury, with local emergency services saying she had been hospitalized.

=== Serhiivka missile strike ===
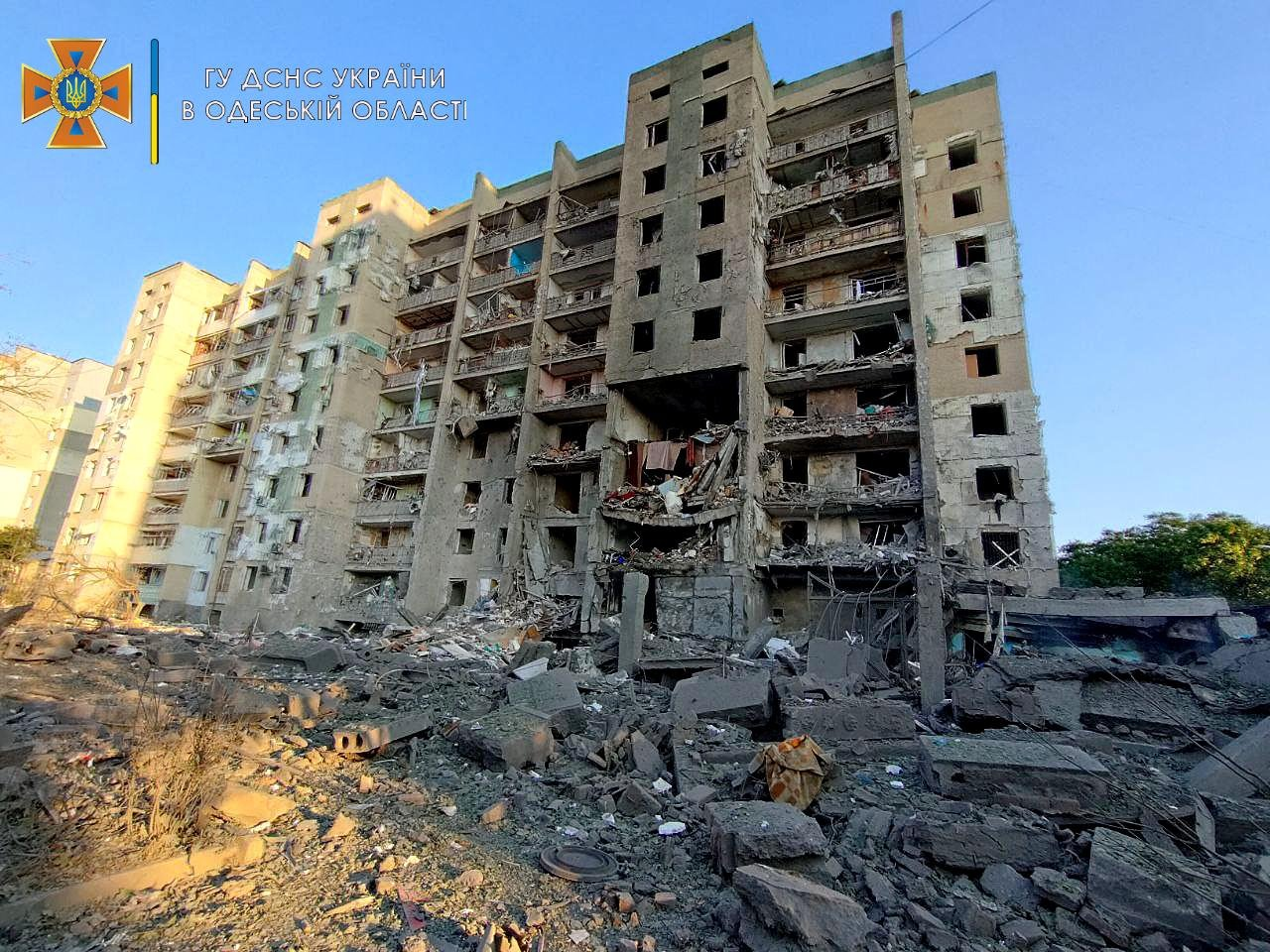
Aftermath of the Serhiivka missile strike, July 2022

According to preliminary information, on the morning of 1 July 2022 at 01:00 AM (UTC+3), three Tu-22M3 strategic bombers of the Russian Air Force flew from the Volgograd Oblast to Crimea and, after 1,200 kilometres (750 mi), fired three Kh-22s, supersonic anti-ship missiles designed for use against aircraft carriers, into a 9-storey apartment building and a recreational center in the settlement of Serhiivka, Bilhorod-Dnistrovskyi Raion, Odesa Oblast. A missile hit the apartment, and one section of the building was completely destroyed. The fire also spread from the apartment building to an attached store. At least 16 Ukrainian civilians were killed in the residential building. Two missiles hit the recreational center, killing at least 5 (including a 12-year-old boy). 38 more were also wounded, including 6 children.

2 July was declared a day of mourning in the region. Ukrainian President Zelenskyy accused Russia of having committed "an act of conscious, deliberately targeted Russian terror—and not some kind of mistake." He noted that as in the recent Kremenchuk shopping mall attack, the Russian army "used unnecessarily powerful weapons to strike a civilian object."

A spokesman for the Russian presidency, Dmitry Peskov, denied that Russia was attacking civilian objects in Ukraine and said that the targeted buildings were used for military purposes. Amnesty International visited the locations and studied satellite imagery, finding no evidence that the targeted buildings were used by the military. Official representative of Germany Steffen Hebestreit described the missile strike as an "inhumane and cynical" war crime.

=== December 2025 attacks ===
On 18 December 2025, the head of Odesa Oblast Military Administration, Oleh Kiper, said that a Russian drone struck a civilian car that was driving across a bridge in Odesa; the driver of the car was killed while her three children that were in the car were injured. Kiper called the attack a "cynical war crime." On 19 December, a Russian ballistic missile attack on port infrastructure killed at least eight people and wounded 27. The port was struck again the next day, and Ukrainian officials said that the bombardment was part of a Russian campaign against Odesa's civilian infrastructure amid freezing winter temperatures.

=== January 2026 attacks ===
On 27 January 2026, officials said that a Russian drone attack in Odesa had killed at least three people and wounded 23, with a pregnant woman and two children among the injured. The drones hit apartment blocks and also targeted the power grid with the coldest winter in years ongoing.

=== February 2026 attacks ===
On the eve of 23 February 2026, the fourth anniversary of the war, Russian forces launched a wave of missile and drone strikes across Ukraine, killing four people, including two civilians in Odesa. Governor Oleh Kiper announced via Telegram that the drone attack damaged production and warehouse facilities, administrative buildings, car dealership premises, and vehicles.

=== March 2026 attacks ===
On 28 March 2026, Odesa was targeted during a Russian drone barrage across the country, with regional officials reporting three deaths, one 76-year-old man later dying of his injuries in the hospital, and 14 injured, including a nine-year-old boy, and a maternity hospital being damaged.

=== April 2026 attacks ===
On 6 April 2026, regional governor Kiper said that a Russian drone attack striking residential buildings, energy infrastructure, and a kindergarten resulted in the deaths of three people, including a mother and her two-year-old daughter, also injuring 16 people, including a pregnant woman and two children.

On 13–14 April 2026, Izmail port in Southern Odesa was attacked by Russian drones, striking two foreign civilian vessels. According to Ukraine's Deputy Prime Minister Oleksiy Kuleba, a Panama-flagged vessel was damaged, along with local infrastructure and equipment. In a separate strike, the country's Ministry for Development of Communities and Territories reported that a Liberian-flagged civilian merchant vessel on its way to the port of Chornomorsk was hit, resulting in a fire. Named Lady Maris by the Ukrainian navy, the vessel was traveling through the maritime corridor to load corn. The fire was immediately extinguished by its crew, and the vessel reached a port safely. In other parts of the region, governor Oleh Kiper reported that there were also strikes where a car repair shop was destroyed, triggering a fire that consumed two passenger buses and seven cars. Meanwhile, six private buildings suffered damage to their roofs, and an ambulance was also harmed. Additionally, regional prosecutors later stated that a 51-year-old man was hospitalized due to the attack.

=== June 2026 attack on beach ===
On 23 June 2026, regional governor Kiper said that a 26-year-old woman had been killed by a Russian drone attack that also injured one more person. According to local Telegram channels, the woman was struck by shrapnel near the beach.

=== July 2026 strike ===
On 17 July 2026, Kiper said that two people had been killed and at least 10 injured in a Russian strike. One of the people killed was a Red Cross volunteer and first-aid instructor, who was heading to a shelter with her children when she was killed.

=== August 2026 strike ===
On 9 August 2026, the Ukrainian Minister of Internal Affairs Ivan Vyhivskyi said that a bus carrying 12 children had been damaged by a blast wave during repeated Russian daytime shelling. No serious injuries were reported.

=== September 2026 strike ===
The Kyiv Independent reported that on 29 September 2026, Russia struck civilian infrastructure, housing, a school and an animal shelter, resulting in six people being wounded.

=== November 2026 drone attack ===
On 13 November 2026, Ukrainian officials reported that two people were killed and seven wounded in Russian drone strikes on Odesa.

== Poltava Oblast ==
=== Kremenchuk shopping mall attack ===
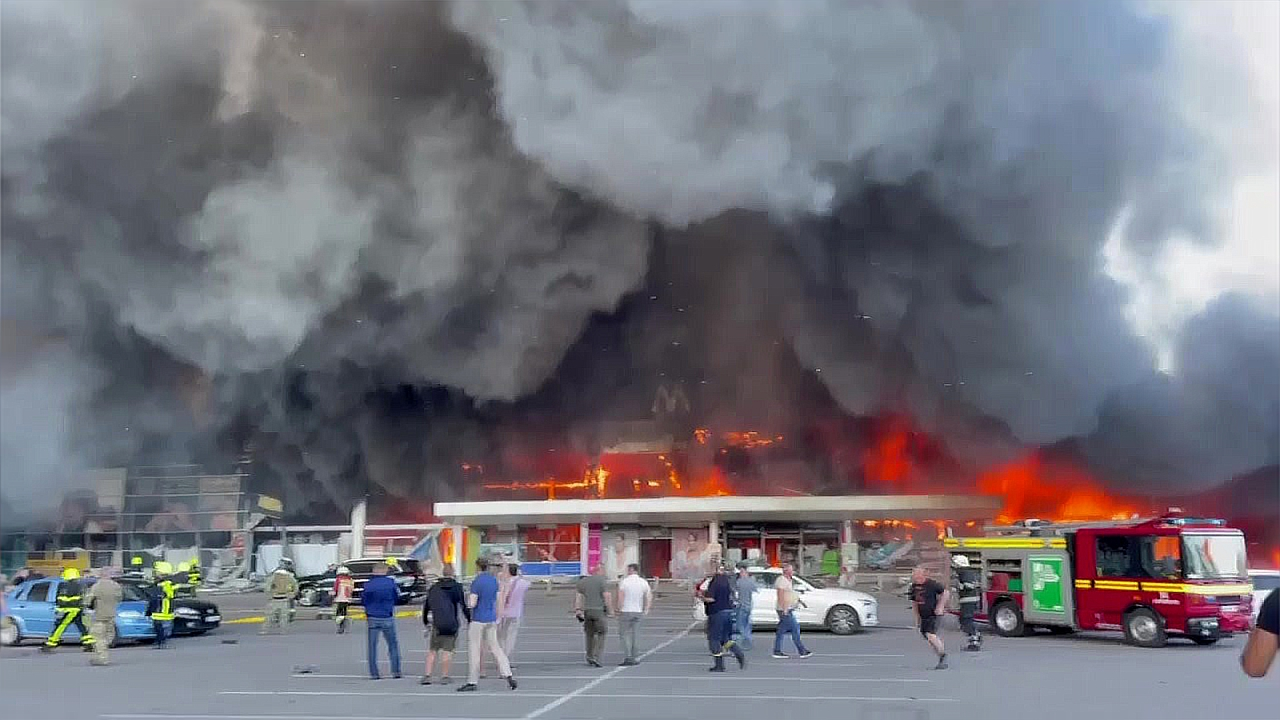
Shopping center in Kremenchuk after the shelling on 27 June 2022

On 27 June 2022, the Russian Armed Forces fired two Kh-22 anti-ship missiles into central Kremenchuk, Poltava Oblast, hitting the Amstor shopping mall. A fire broke out, and, according to Dmytro Lunin, Governor of Poltava Oblast, the attack killed at least 20 people and injured at least 56. 36 people were also initially reported missing. According to the Ukrainian Armed Forces, the attack was carried out by Russian Tu-22M3 strategic bombers that took off from the Shaykovka air base in the Kaluga Oblast. The missiles were launched over the territory of the Kursk Oblast. Ukrainian Interior Minister Denys Monastyrsky said that the missile hit the far end of the shopping mall. The area of the resulting fire was more than 10,000 square metres (110,000 sq ft), and up to 115 firefighters and 20 fire-fighting appliances were involved in extinguishing it.

On the day of the attack, Russian television did not report it until the Russian Ministry of Defense confirmed that it had happened. Pro-Russian Telegram channels have spread multiple conflicting theories about the missile strike, including the claim that the missile was aimed at a car factory near the mall; that the mall was being used as a military equipment warehouse or as a base of the Territorial Defense Forces; and that the missile strike is a Ukrainian provocation involving the use of "canned bodies." On the day after the attack, Russian authorities and state-controlled media issued a number of contradictory statements about the attack, including claims that the attack was "fake" and that the Ukrainian army had bombed the mall themselves. Russian Defense Ministry spokesman Igor Konashenkov said, "The detonation of the munitions for Western weaponry in storage led to a fire in a non-functioning shopping centre next to the factory." The claims that the shopping mall was "non-functional" have been debunked by several organizations. According to Ukrainian President Volodymyr Zelenskyy, there were more than 1,000 people inside the mall when the strike occurred. The non-profit online journalism collective Bellingcat used receipts from recent purchases at the mall to prove that the mall had been open prior to the attack. The BBC also published interviews with people who were working or shopping in the mall at the time. Per reports from independent military experts and researchers with Molfar, a global open-source intelligence community, the factory and mall were too far apart from one another to cause any fires or explosions.

The leaders of the G7 nations, US Secretary of State Antony Blinken British Prime Minister Boris Johnson, Ukrainian president Volodymyr Zelenskyy, Ukraine's Foreign Minister Dmytro Kuleba and Mayor Vitalii Maletskyi described the attack as "war crimes," "crimes against humanity," and "indiscriminate attacks", as well as claiming that the attack was intentional and that there were "no close military targets."

=== February 2025 Poltava missile strike ===
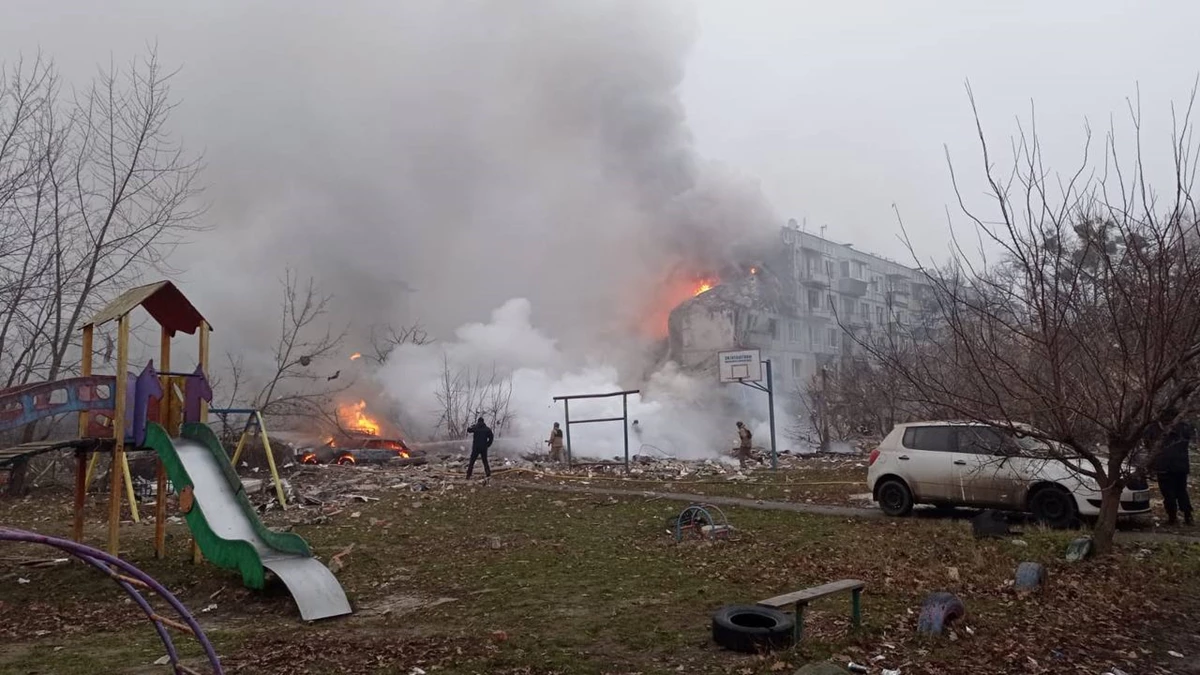
Aftermath of the 1 February 2025 Poltava missile strike

On 1 February 2025, Russia struck a residential building in Poltava, which emergency services said killed 14 people, including two children.

=== July 2026 drone strike ===
On 30 July 2026, Poltava's regional head Vitalii Diakivnych said that one person had been killed in a drone attack.

=== October 2026 ===
On 8 October 2026, the region reported that two people had been killed and dozens injured in Russian strikes that damaged more than 430 apartments and private houses in Kremenchuk.

On 29 October, Diakivnych reported further attacks on Kremenchuk with drones hitting residential buildings and a school, killing three people and injuring 28.

== Rivne missile strikes ==
On 14 March 2022, Russian troops carried out two airstrikes against the Rivnenska TV Tower, as a result of which 21 people were killed and 9 were injured. Rockets hit the television tower and administrative buildings nearby. On 25 June, a rocket attack was carried out on civilian infrastructure in the city of Sarny. At least four people were killed and seven others were injured. On the morning of 22 October 2022, Russian troops launched a missile attack on energy infrastructure; as a result of the attack, electric substations were damaged. There were no casualties.

== Sumy Oblast ==
=== Okhtyrka school bombing ===
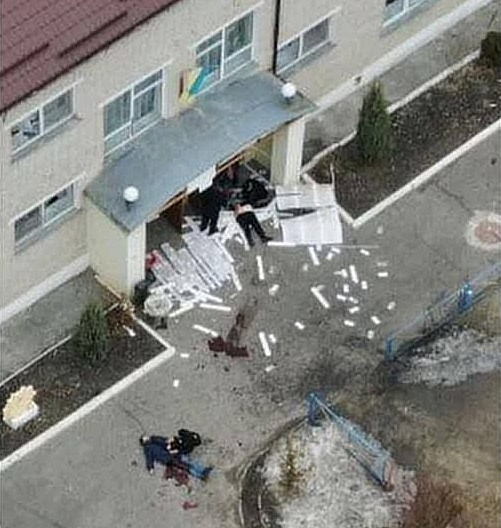
Civilians killed in a Russian cluster bombing of Okhtyrka, 25 February 2022

On 25 February 2022, Russian cluster bombs from a 220 mm BM-27 Uragan rocket hit a preschool in Okhtyrka used as a civilian bomb shelter, killing three people, including a child. UAV film showed four hits on the roof of the preschool, three on the ground next to the school, two injured or dead civilians, and pools of blood. Amnesty International analysed 65 photos and videos of the event and interviewed local residents. Bellingcat stated that remains of the 9M27K rocket were found 200 metres east of the kindergarten. Russian forces were located west of Okhtyrka. Amnesty described the rocket type as "unguided and notoriously inaccurate" and described the attack as potentially a war crime that should be investigated.

=== Sumy airstrikes and drone strikes ===
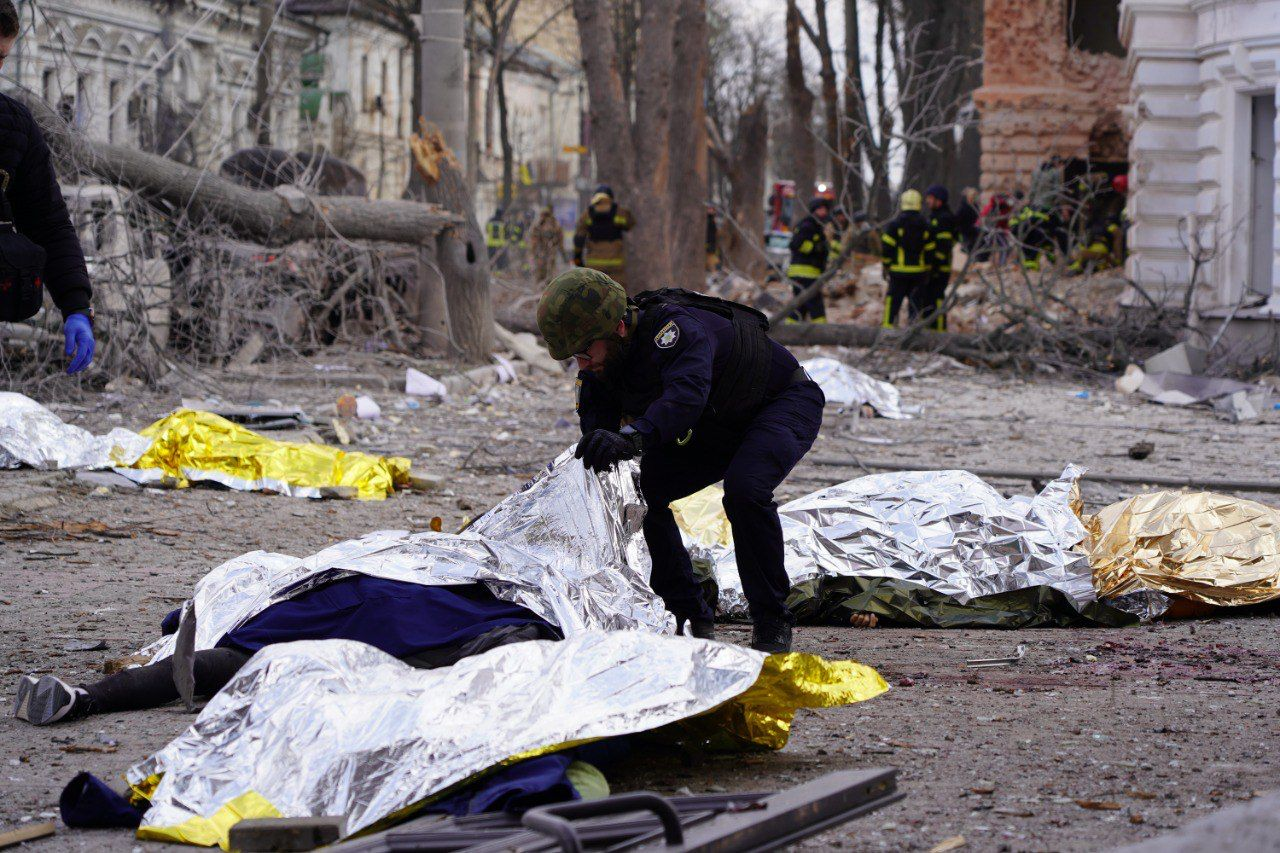
Aftermath of the Russian missile strike on Sumy, 13 April 2025, which killed 35 people

In the evening and throughout the night on 7 March 2022, Russian forces executed an airstrike on Sumy's residential neighbourhood. About 22 people were killed, including three children. Under the procedural guidance of the Sumy District Prosecutor's Office, criminal proceedings have been instituted for violating the laws and customs of war.

On 19 September 2024, a Russian guided aerial bomb struck a five-story nursing home for the elderly in Sumy, killing at least one and injuring 12, according to the Ukrainian Interior Ministry. The oblast had been hit regularly by Russian shelling and airstrikes since the beginning of the invasion in 2022, but Ukraine's offensive into the Kursk Oblast brought the front line closer and led to an increase in attacks by Russia. The energy infrastructure in particular had been badly damaged in Sumy, as part of a broader Russian campaign to degrade Ukraine's power plants and make it more difficult for utilities to provide basic services.

The United Nations Human Rights Monitoring Mission said in a September 2024 report that large-scale Russian attacks on Ukrainian energy infrastructure "have inflicted extensive harm and hardship on the country's civilian population, with potentially devastating consequences as winter approaches."

On 28 September 2024, Ukrainian officials reported that at least eight people had died following two consecutive Russian drone attacks on a medical centre in Sumy. Interior Minister Klymenko said that the first attack in the morning killed one person, and it was followed by another attack while patients and staff were evacuating. Regional prosecutors said there were 86 patients and 38 staff in the medical centre at the time of the attack. The method of hitting a target once and then striking the same target again as first responders arrive is known as a "double tap". Russia has been accused of carrying out strikes of this type during its invasion of Ukraine.

On 18 November 2024, a Russian strike devastated a residential building in Sumy, with 11 deaths, including two children, and 89 wounded reported by Ukraine's Emergencies Ministry. Interior Minister Ihor Klymenko also said the attack left Sumy's administrative center without power.

On 22 July 2025, Russian forces struck residential buildings in Sumy, injuring at least 12 people.

On 4 April 2026, the regional head Oleh Hryhorov said that one person had been killed after a Russian guided aerial bomb hit an apartment block.

On 27 June 2026, Hryhorov said that a 66-year-old man was killed as a result of a Russian drone attack on a house, while adding that further attacks in the region injured 10 people.

On 3 July 2026, regional officials and Ukraine's state emergency service said that a Russian guided bomb and drone attack on Sumy resulted in three people being killed, including a five-year-old child and her mother, while 27 people were reported injured, with children also among the injured.

On 17 July 2026, local authorities said that Russian attacks injured 10 people across three Sumy communities, including a four-year-old girl.

On 5 August 2026, Suspilne said that Russian guided bomb strikes had destroyed two houses on the night of 3–4 August, killing a 76-year-old woman in one house and two siblings aged five and ten in the other, where their mother managed to pull out the father from the rubble.

On 20 September 2026, Reuters reported a Russian strike close to an apartment building in Sumy, killing one person and wounding another.

Zelenskyy said that on 29 September, Russia struck Sumy with guided aerial bombs, with one bomb hitting a school with children inside. No injuries were reported, as both students and teachers were sheltering during the strike. Sumy authorities also said a separate strike hit a residential building, with two dead and nine wounded reported.

==== Palm Sunday missile strike on Sumy ====
On 13 April 2025, Russian missiles struck Sumy residents gathering for Sunday church services, killing at least 32 people, including two children, and wounding at least 99 people, including 11 children according to the Interior Ministry of Ukraine. Ukrainian officials said that the attack was carried out using two ballistic missiles, and cluster munitions were used in order to kill as many civilians as possible. According to Ukraine's Economy Minister Yulia Svyrydenko, the attack was carried out on one of the busiest church-going days of the year. CNN verified social media footage of the attack. The attack was the deadliest single attack on Ukrainian civilians since 2023, when 51 civilians were killed in strikes on Kupiansk. The attack was internationally condemned, with the Trump administration's special envoy to Ukraine and Russia, Keith Kellogg, commenting on the attack, saying it ″crosses any line of decency.″ The European Union's foreign policy chief, Kaja Kallas, also commented, calling the strike a "horrific example of Russia intensifying attacks while Ukraine has accepted an unconditional ceasefire," while French President Emmanuel Macron said "strong measures" are needed for a ceasefire. Military expert Joakim Paasikivi referred to the strikes as an "obvious war crime," noting the usage of ballistic missiles on the city center of Sumy and the amount of killed and wounded.

==== Killing of couple fleeing village ====
On 27 January 2025, a couple was killed by Russian forces as they were trying to evacuate from a Krasnopillia village in Sumy. According to regional head Oleh Hryhorov, the man was trying to pull his injured wife on a sled towards a safer area before a drone first struck and killed his injured wife and a second FPV killed the man.

==== Repeated drone strikes on shopping center ====
On 9 September 2026, Hryhorov said that a Russian drone struck a Sumy shopping center, killing two people and injuring 20 as a fire broke out and the building was badly damaged. The next day, the city administration said the building had been struck again by another Russian drone while it was closed for repairs. No casualties were reported in the second strike, though it caused another fire.

==== Strike on Indian-owned pharmaceutical facility ====
On 5 October 2026, Ukrainian authorities said that an Indian-owned pharmaceutical facility in Sumy had been hit by a Russian drone strike, killing one employee and severely injuring several others. The owner said it was directly targeted, adding that the strike would also impact those depending on its supply of essential medicines.

== Uman apartment block strike ==
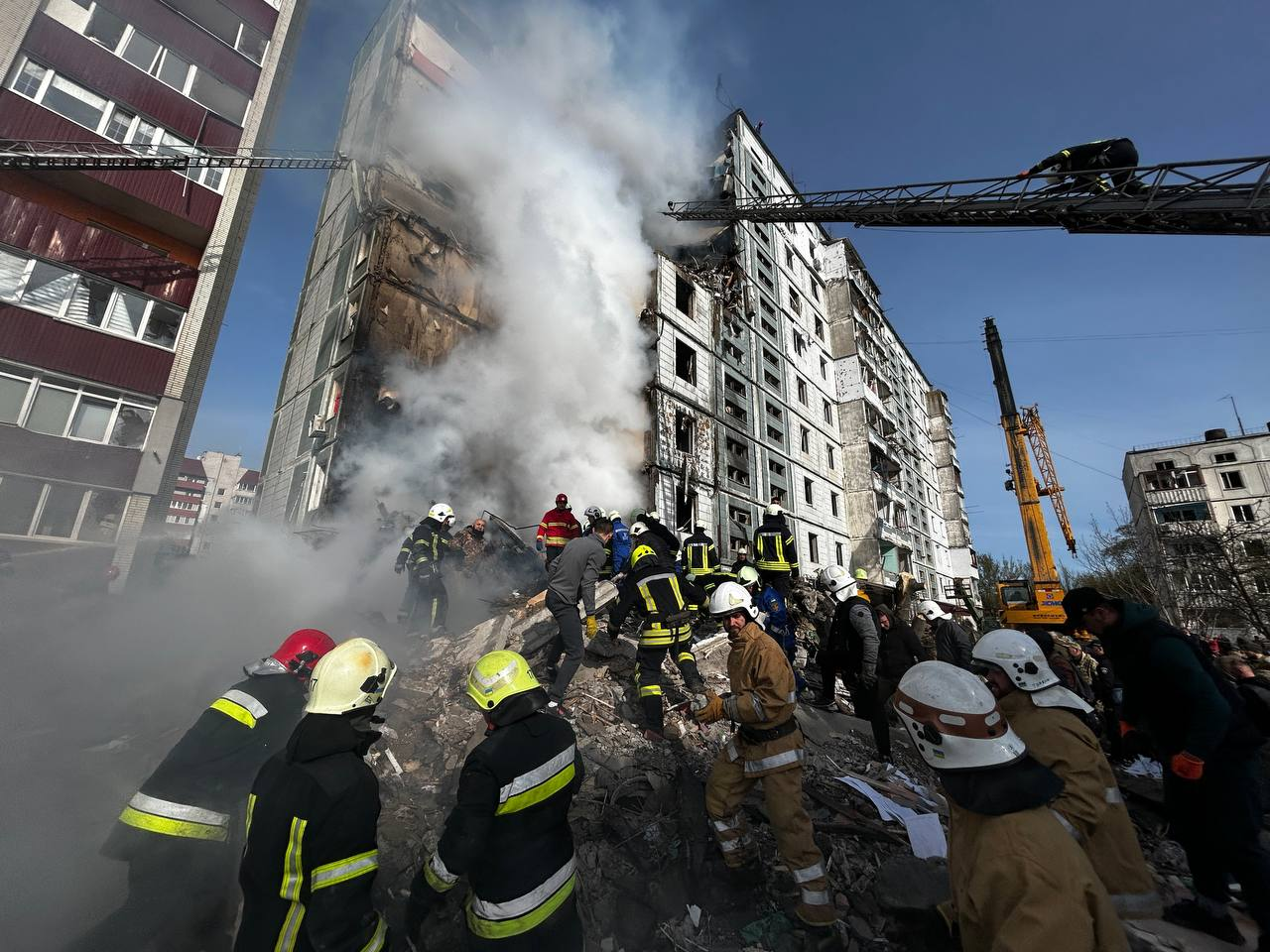
Aftermath of the Uman apartment block strike

On 28 April 2023, Russian forces launched 23 cruise missiles and two suicide drones at targets across Ukraine. Two missiles hit an apartment block in Uman, killing 23 people, including four children. Nine other residential buildings were damaged in the city. Shortly after, the Russian Defense Ministry posted a photo of a missile launch on its Telegram channel with the caption "Right on target." The message outraged Ukrainians, who saw it as gloating over the casualties. The Russian Defense Ministry said it had targeted Ukrainian army reserve units with the strikes. Power grid operator Ukrenergo said the missile barrage did not damage the country's energy infrastructure.

== Vinnytsia Oblast ==
=== Vinnytsia missile strike ===
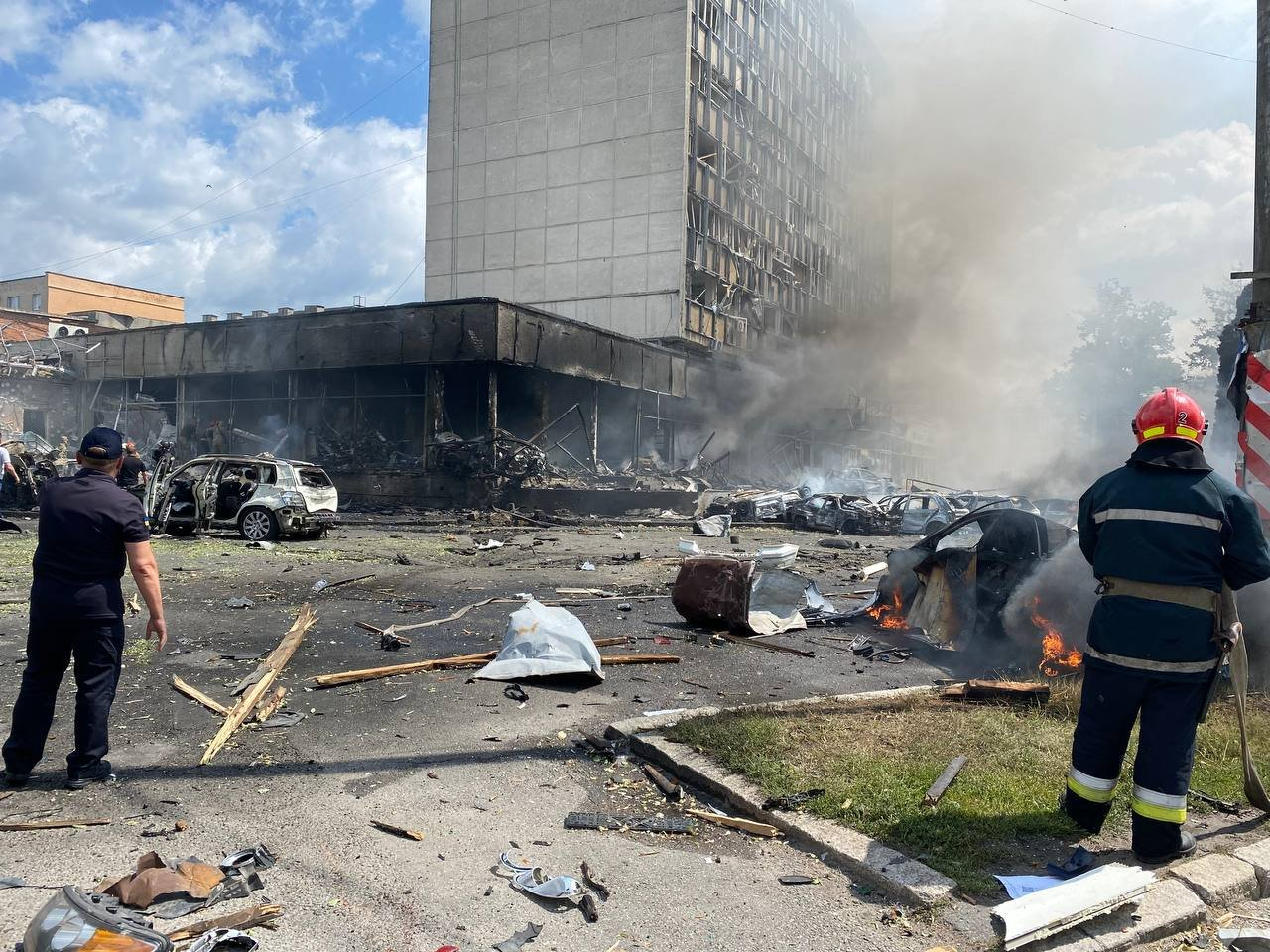
Aftermath of the Vinnytsia missile strike, 14 July 2022

At about 10:10 AM on 14 July 2022, an air raid alarm sounded in the city. At approximately 10:42, local residents reported three explosions in the city. Before that, local residents noticed a missile flying over Bershad city and Vinnytsia. According to Ukrainian authorities, the Russian Naval Forces fired five Kalibr cruise missiles from a submarine in the Black Sea. Ukraine claims that two of the missiles were shot down. One of the missiles reportedly hit the House of Officers, a Soviet-era concert hall. But, according to Ukrainian officials, two missiles also struck civilian buildings, including a medical center, offices, stores, and residential buildings in the center of the city. The attacks killed at least 28 people (including three children) and injured at least 202 others.

Local officials pointed out that Kalibr missiles are high-precision, which indicates that the Russians purposefully targeted civilians. The strike has been labeled as a war crime by officials from multiple countries. Ukrainian president Volodymyr Zelenskyy wrote on his Telegram channel: "Vinnytsia. Missile strikes in the city centre. There are wounded and killed, among them a little child. Every day, Russia destroys the civilian population, kills Ukrainian children, and directs rockets at civilian objects. Where there is nothing military. What is this if not an open terrorist attack? Inhuman. Country of killers. A country of terrorists". The strike has also been labeled as a war crime by Ukrainian Interior Minister Denys Monastyrsky.

The Ministry of Defense of Russia officially recognized the attack on Vinnytsia the next day, saying that they hit the garrison house of officers, where allegedly "...a meeting of the command of the Ukrainian Air Force with representatives of foreign arms suppliers was taking place..." According to them, most participants of the meeting were killed. Among the dead were allegedly three officers of the Air Force of Ukraine. The missile strike occurred during a conference in The Hague on holding Russia accountable for war crimes. The ambassador of Moldova to Ukraine, Valeriu Chiveri, condemned the attack on Vinnytsia, referring to attacks on civilian targets in Ukrainian cities away from the frontlines as crimes against humanity. He also mentioned the European Union's decision to grant candidate status to both Moldova and Ukraine and talked about the need for both countries to work together.

=== November 2026 killing of 13-year-old girl ===
In November 2026, the Koziatyn City Council said that a 13-year-old girl had been killed in a Russian drone attack on an educational instution in the city.

== Zaporizhzhia Oblast ==
=== Bombing of Zaporizhzhia ===
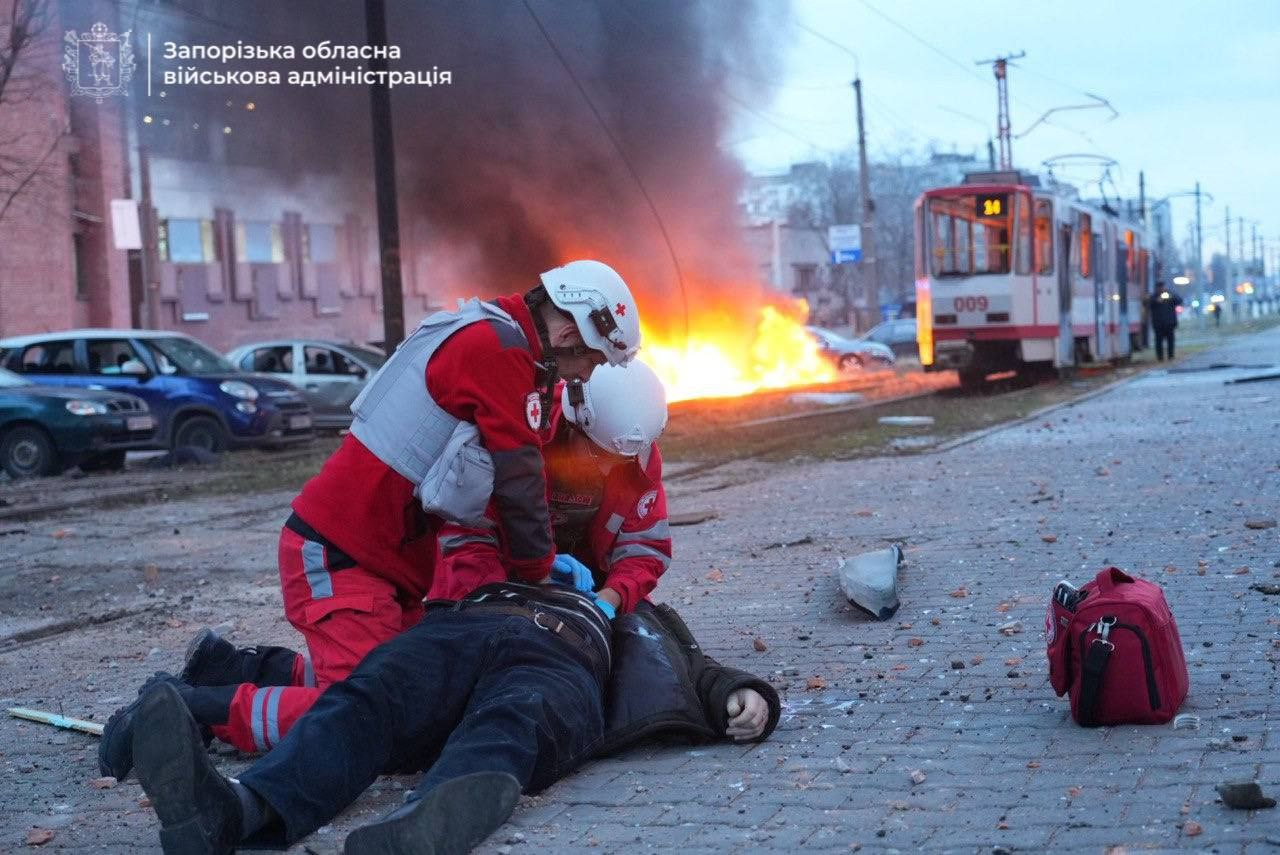
Paramedics helping a victim of a Russian guided bomb strike on Zaporizhzhia, 8 January 2025, which killed 13 people

One civilian was killed and two others injured when five Russian shells were fired at Zaporizhzhia at 7.15pm on 12 August 2022. Further city infrastructure in the Shevchenkivskyi District was also damaged in the shelling.

During the night of 19 September 2022, Zaporizhzhia was hit by eight Russian rockets in its industrial and residential areas. Followed by another rocket attack in the morning, striking the regional center near the Dnieper river. Two days later the city was again hit by two Russian rockets during the night, followed by another five rockets attacks in the daytime. The regional center was hit an additional two times while other infrastructure and residential houses were damaged, two of the projectiles landed in a field on the outskirts of the city. The attack wounded three civilians. The following day on 22 September, nine more rockets were fired at the city. One of the projectiles hit a hotel in the city's central park, killing one civilian and injuring five others. An electrical substation and several high-rise residential buildings were also damaged. Later that same day, ten more rockets struck the city and damaged about a dozen private homes.

At 5.08 am on 6 October 2022, seven Russian rockets were fired towards the city center of Zaporizhzhia. Several residential buildings were destroyed, and fires broke out due to the attack, killing 17 civilians and injuring 12 more. Zaporizhzhia was attacked once more during the night of 7 October, but this time by Iranian Shahed-136 kamikaze drones used by the Russian forces. The attack resulted in the deaths of 12 civilians with a further 13 injured and 15 missing.

Around 3 am on 9 October 2022, 12 Russian tactical missiles were launched against civilian infrastructure in Zaporizhzhia. Most missiles hit both high-rise buildings and residential houses, with a nine-story building being partially destroyed after the attack. A further five high-rise buildings, 20 residential houses, and four schools were damaged alongside 20 cars. A total of 13 civilians were killed in the attack, while 89 more were injured. The following day at 1.45 am, about seven Russian S-300 anti-aircraft missiles struck the city, resulting in the deaths of eight civilians. On 23 November, Russian missile strikes destroyed a maternity ward in Ukraine's Zaporizhzhia Oblast, in the town of Vilnyansk, killing a newborn baby.

On 10 October 2022, at 1.45 am, about seven Russian S-300 anti-aircraft missiles struck the city, resulting in the deaths of eight civilians. Later on the day, an apartment block was destroyed and a kindergarten was damaged by shelling. 5 people were killed and 8 were injured in that shelling.

On 11 November 2024, an overnight glide bomb attack on Zaporizhzhia damaged a dormitory and partially destroyed a two-story apartment building. Ukraine's police said that one person was killed and 21 injured, including a four-year-old.

On 6 December 2024, a car shop in Zaporizhzhia was struck by Russia. Regional officials said that 10 people were killed and 24 wounded, including two children.

On 10 December 2024, local officials said a private clinic and residential buildings in Zaporizhzhia were hit by a ballistic missile, most likely an Iskander, killing at least eight people and injuring another 22, including a child.

On 8 January 2025, Russian troops launched glide bombs at Zaporizhzhia in the afternoon, with at least two bombs striking residential buildings according to the regional governor Ivan Fedorov. The following day, the death toll was 13 people and the amount of injured around 113.

On 5 October 2025, Fedorov said one person had been killed and 10 wounded by overnight Russian attacks that also left more than 73,000 people without power after a power plant was struck.

On 10 October 2025, a child was reported killed while several others, including his parents, were wounded as Russia targeted Zaporizhzhia residential areas and energy sites with drones, guided bombs, and missiles.

On 3 April 2026, local authorities in Nikopol said that five people had been killed and 27 wounded in Russian overnight air raids. On 7 April, Dnipropetrovsk governor Oleksandr Ganzha said that Russian FPV drones struck buses in the region, with one hitting a bus approaching Nikopol's city center, killing four people and injuring at least 16. A second bus was hit in a neighboring community, injuring five people.

==== Zaporizhzhia civilian convoy attack ====
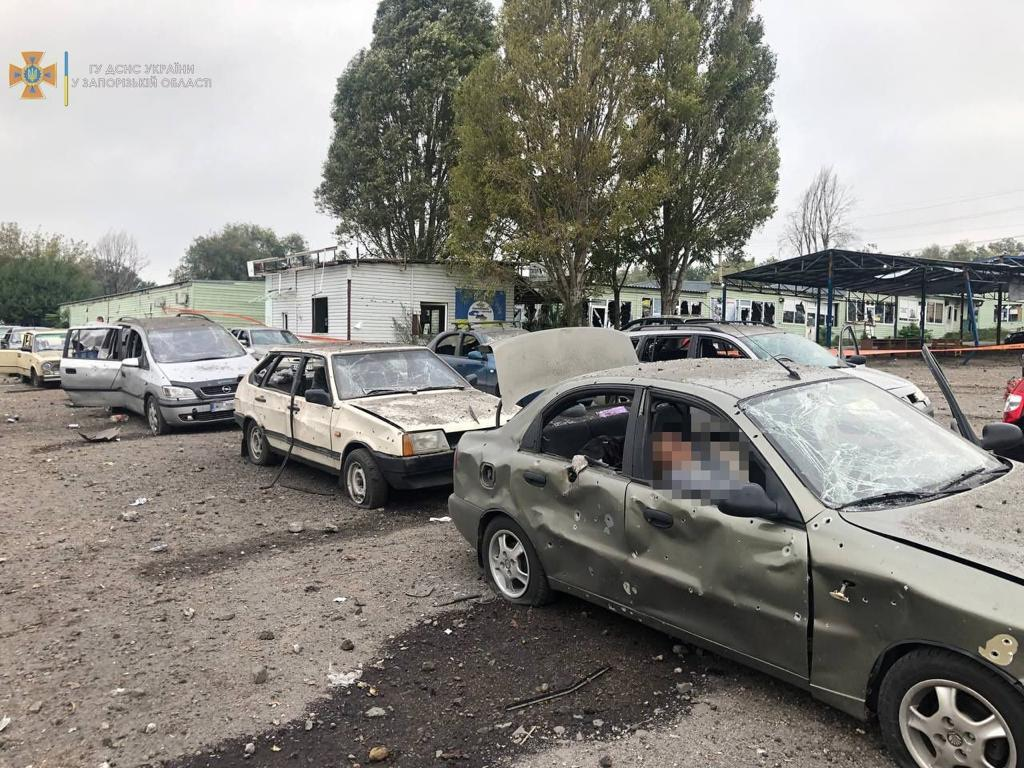
Aftermath of the Zaporizhzhia civilian convoy attack, September 2022

On 30 September 2022, a Russian S-300 missile hit a civilian convoy of civilian cars near Zaporizhzhia, killing 32 people, including a three-month-old child. and injuring around 88. People in cars had gathered in a logistic hub to register for entering Russian-occupied territories in the south, such as the cities of Mariupol and Melitopol, and they were planning either to return home or to meet relatives and take them back to government-controlled territory. According to a spokesperson for the local governor's office, the attack on civilians was deliberate, as no military objective was placed near the site. It occurred hours before Russia formally annexed four oblasts of Ukraine, including Zaporizhzhia Oblast.

==== Zaporizhzhia apartment block strike ====
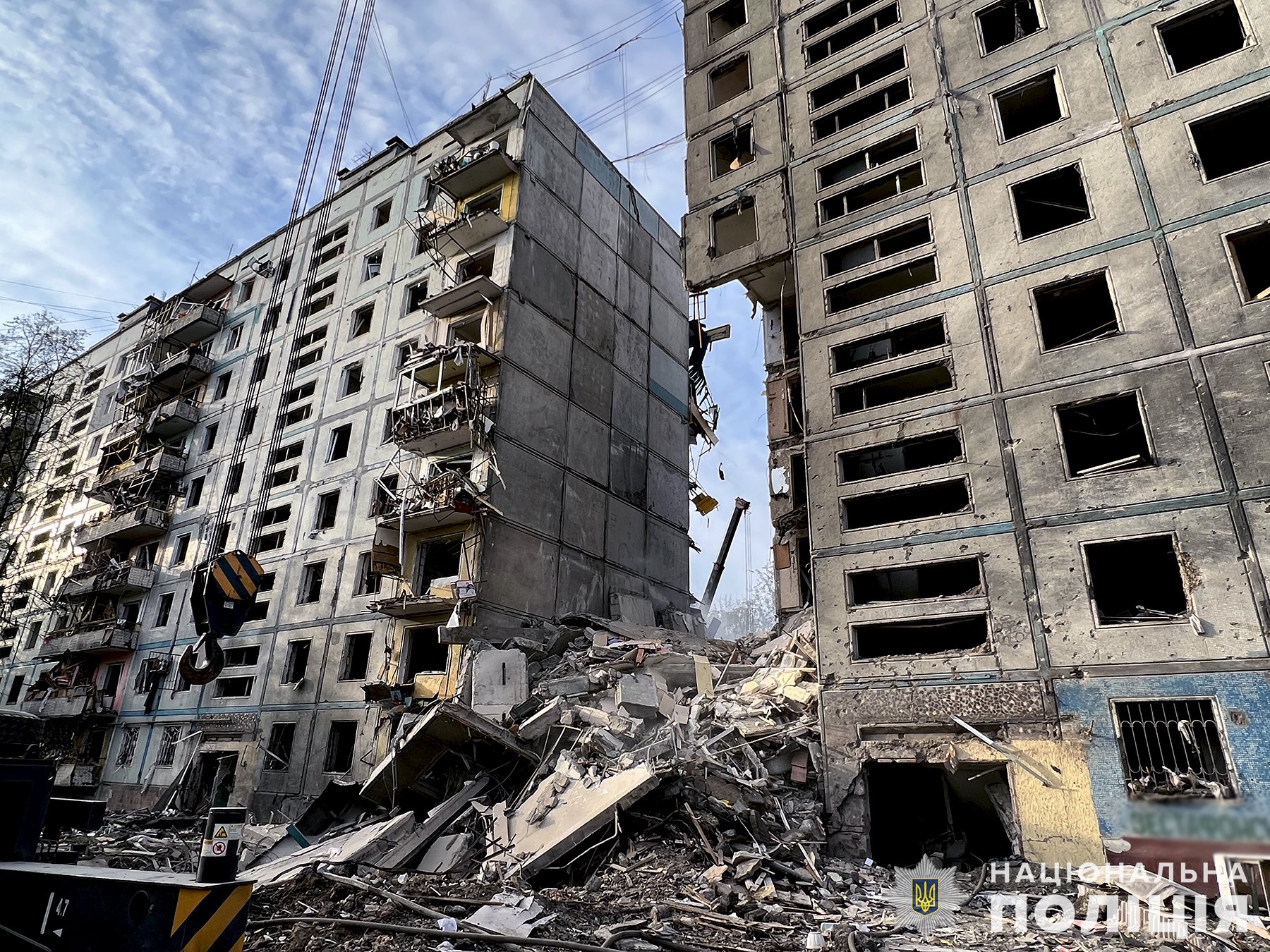
Aftermath of the Zaporizhzhia apartment block strike

On 9 October 2022, 3 a.m. (UTC+3:00), six missiles were launched at a residential area in Zaporizhzhia, destroying an apartment building and damaging 70 other buildings. The attack resulted in the deaths of 13 people, including a child. Another 89 were injured, 11 of whom are children. The missiles reportedly originated from Russian-controlled locations in Zaporizhzhia. The airstrike took place the day after an explosion damaged large parts of the Crimean Bridge, which Russian president Vladimir Putin accused Ukraine of carrying out and called it an "act of terrorism."

=== Orikhiv aid center bombing ===
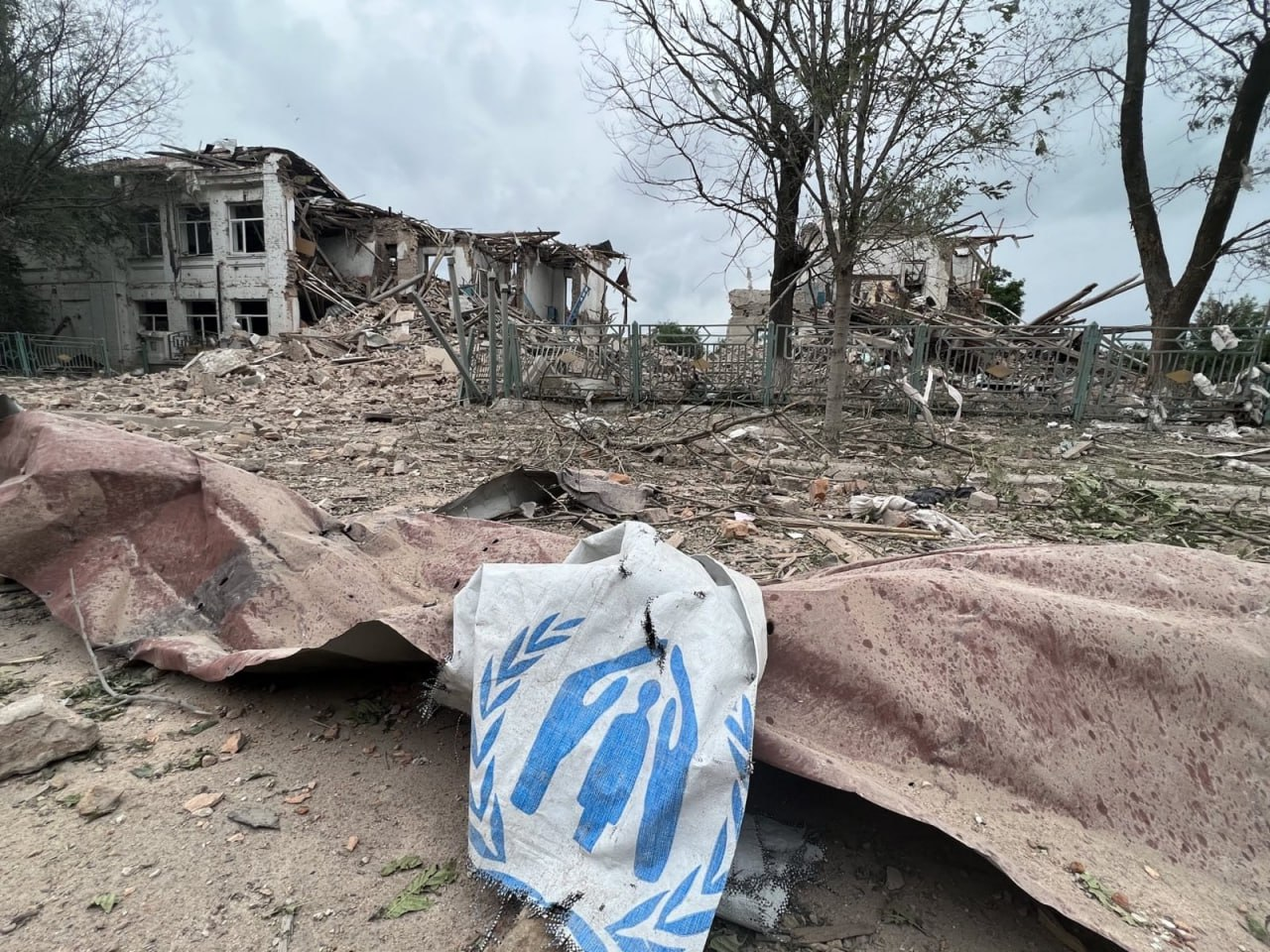
Aid center destroyed by a Russian bomb on 9 July 2023

On 9 July 2023, a Russian guided bomb struck a school being used to distribute humanitarian aid in the town of Orikhiv, Zaporizhzhia Oblast. Seven people were killed and eleven wounded. The General Prosecutor's office said the attack was being investigated as a war crime.

=== Malokaterynivka strike near children's playground ===
On 21 August 2024, a 14-year-old boy died following a Russian munition hitting a kiosk a few meters away from a children's playground in Malokaterynivka, southern Zaporizhzhia. The Ukrainian police stated that four children ranging in age from 11 to 17 had been injured in the attack.

=== Bilenke prison bombing ===
On 28 July 2025, Ukraine's Penitentiary Service said that Russian strikes targeted the Bilenke penitentiary, killing at least 17 and wounding 82. Buildings within the penitentiary were destroyed, and adjacent private homes were damaged in the attack.

=== June 2026 attack ===
On 27 June 2026, Ukraine's state emergency service said that Russian attacks on Zaporizhzhia resulted in nine injuries, including three children.

=== July 2026 attacks ===
On 6 July 2026, regional officials and Ukraine's emergency services said that two people had been killed and nine injured, including a child, when Russian drones attacked filling stations across the region.

On 17 July, local authorities said that Russia carried out 853 strikes across the region, hitting 58 settlements and killing three people and injuring five, including four children.

On 27 July, Fedorov said that a 67-year-old man was killed and seven people injured by Russian airstrikes.

=== August 2026 double-tap strike ===
On 9 August 2026, Minister Vyhivskyi said that a firefighter was killed while two other emergency workers were injured in a Russian double-tap strike.

=== October 2026 attacks ===
The Kyiv Post said that on 29 September 2026, Russian attacks wounded 34 people, with 33 of them resulting from a strike on an industrial facility.

On 10 October, local officials reported that Russian glide bombs striking residential buildings killed at least 20 people, including four children, while at least 32 people were injured. The attack came shortly after Donald Trump eased sanctions on Russia to import diesel, and Zelenskyy commented that the attacks were ″Russia expressing its thanks″ to Trump.

=== November 2026 bombing of school used as humanitarian aid center ===
Following a Russian strike on Komyshuvakha, Zaporizhzhia on November 2, Ukrainian State Emergency Service clear bodies of victims.

On 2 November 2026, Ukrainian officials reported that Russia repeatedly struck a school in Komyshuvakha being used as a center for humanitarian aid.

The death toll was at least 53 people in the week after the attack, according to Governor Mykhaylo Semikin. The strike was the deadliest in Zaporizhzhia since the start of the full scale invasion.

Michael O'Flaherty, Council of Europe Commissioner for Human Rights, condemned the double-tap strike as a violation of international humanitarian law and as such, the attack amounting to war crimes.

Two of the victims were rescue workers, and four policemen. Bodycam footage from one of the killed police officers, verified by Reuters, shows workers descending to the shelter from the first strike when the second strike hits.

By 7 November, the Zaporizhzhia administration said the death toll had risen to 55, with more than 30 people possibly still under the rubble as search operations were underway. On the same day, the State Emergency Service said Russia deliberately targeted emergency workers on the scene with a FPV drone, which was condemned by Zelenskyy as highlighting Russia's ″cynicism and cruelty″. No injuries were reported, but emergency rescue equipment was damaged. On 16 November, the reported death toll had risen to 72, with four people missing and four in hospital.

On 13 November, authorities said that Zaporizhzhia city itself was struck by Russian Tornado-S rockets, hitting apartment buildings. The attack resulted in one death, a rescue worker who died while clearing debris at the site, as well as 50 people being injured, including eight children.

== Zakarpattia Oblast ==
On 21 August 2025, Ukrainian officials said that 15 people were injured when Russian cruise missiles struck an American factory in Mukachevo, Zakarpattia Oblast, producing household goods.

== Bombing of Zhytomyr ==
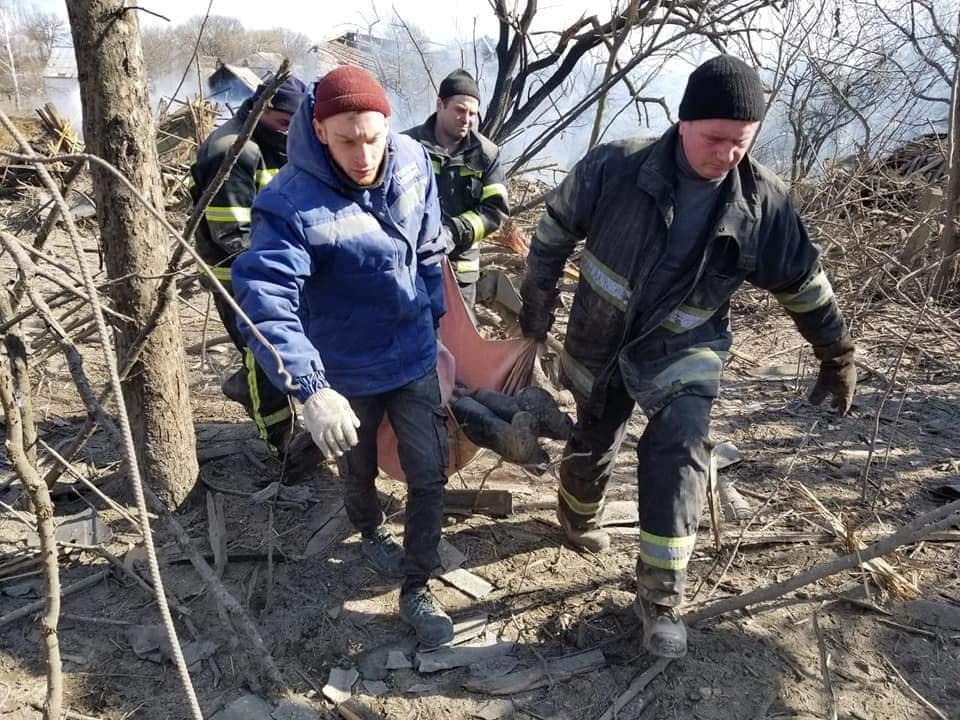
Emergency servicemen carry a dead body found under rubble in Malyn city, Zhytomyr Oblast, after a Russian airstrike on 8 March 2022.

On 1 March 2022, late in the evening, Russian troops hit a residential sector of the city. About 10 residential buildings on Shukhevych Street and around the city hospital were damaged. A few bombs were dropped on the city. As a result, at least two Ukrainian civilians were killed and three were injured. On 2 March, shells hit the regional perinatal center and some private houses. On 4 March, rockets hit the 25th Zhytomyr school, destroying half of the school. On 8 March, in an air assault, a dormitory was hit. On 9 March, the outskirts of the city (Ozerne district) came under fire.

== Ternopil Oblast ==
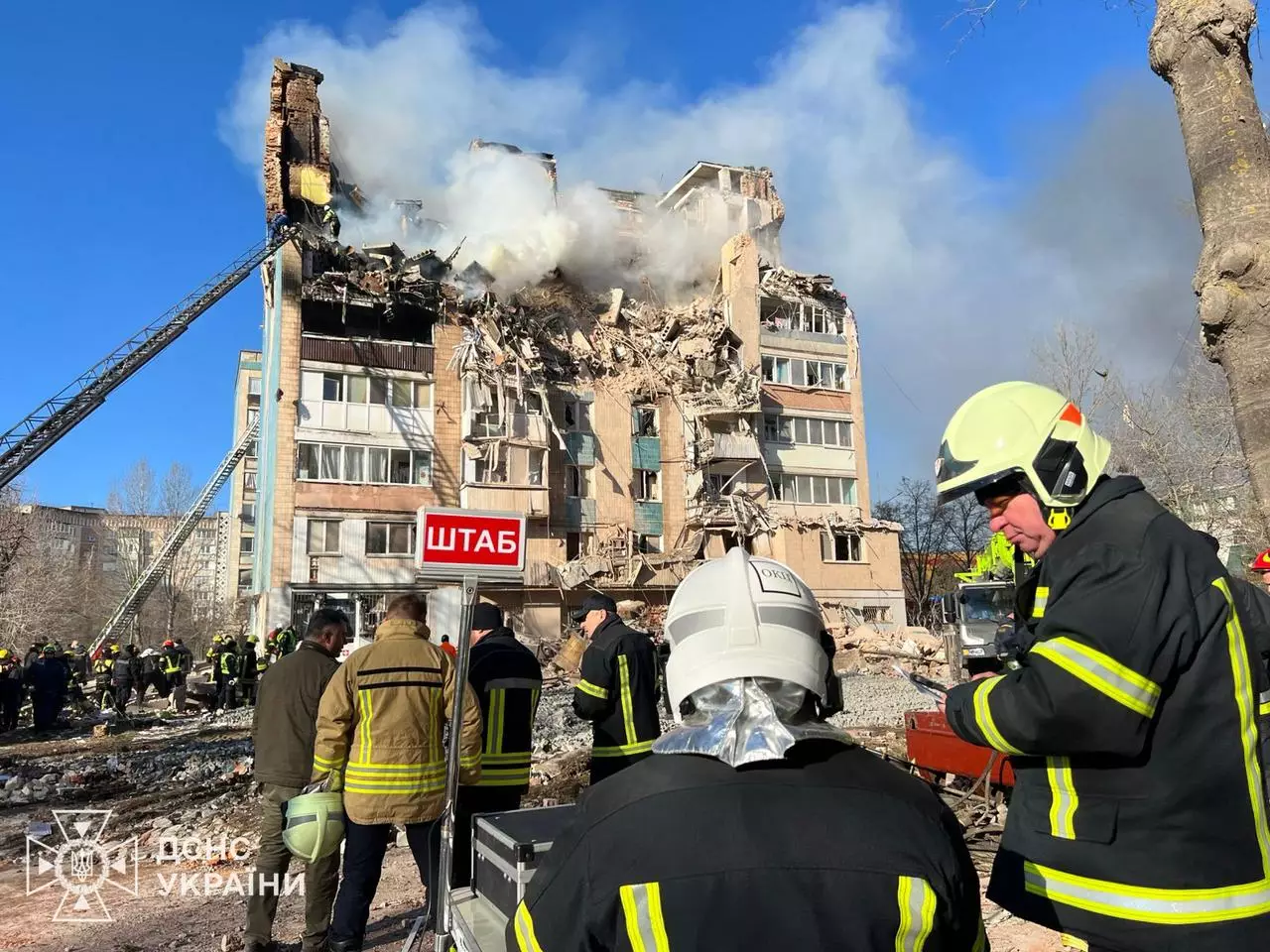
Aftermath of the Russian airstrike on Ternopil, 19 November 2025, which killed 36 people

On 19 November 2025, Ukrainian officials said that Russian cruise missiles had struck residential buildings in Ternopil, western Ukraine, killing at least 34 people and wounding over 90 others, with six children being among the dead and 15 children among the wounded. A video shared by Zelenskyy showed one of the residential buildings completely caved in. The attack, which took place close to the Polish border, resulted in NATO scrambling aircraft and Poland temporarily closing two of its airports.

== Cherkasy Oblast ==
On 14 April 2026, the head of the Cherkasy Oblast military administration, Ihor Taburets, said that five people had been killed, including an eight-year-old boy, and 12 people wounded by a Russian drone attack.

== Incident in Galați, Romania ==
On 29 May 2026, Romania said that a Russian Geran-2 drone had struck a residential block in Galati, causing a fire that injured two people and required the evacuation of seventy more. Romania's president Nicusor Dan said the Russian drone had hit the building by mistake.

== Placement of military objectives near civilian objects ==
Both the Russian and the Ukrainian armies have been accused of violating international humanitarian law by locating military objectives within densely populated areas without removing civilians to safer areas. International humanitarian law requires all parties to the conflict to avoid, to the extent feasible, "locating military objectives within or near densely populated areas" and requires them to "remove civilian persons and objects under its control from the vicinity of military objectives." Contrary to the use of human shields, these fighting tactics do not involve utilizing the presence of civilians to render certain areas immune from military operations.

On 29 June, the Office of the United Nations High Commissioner for Human Rights expressed concern about Russian and Ukrainian armed forces taking up positions close to civilian objects without taking measures for protecting the civilians. The human rights agency had also received reports of the use of human shields. OHCHR documented the consequences of these fighting tactics in the case of a care house in Stara Krasnianka, where the Ukrainian army had set up a firing position without first evacuating the residents, and in the case of a school in Yahidne, where 360 residents, including 74 children were held captive by Russian forces for almost a month. Similar concerns were raised also by a report published on 20 July by the Organization for Security and Co-operation in Europe and by Human Rights Watch on 21 July.

Amnesty International said on 4 August that it had found evidence that Ukrainian forces had repeatedly put civilians in danger by establishing bases and firing positions in populated residential areas, including schools and hospitals; some areas were kilometres away from front lines, and, according to Amnesty International, alternative locations were available to the Ukrainian army. Between April and July, Amnesty International researchers found evidence that Ukrainian military objectives had been placed within residential areas in 19 towns and villages in the Kharkiv, Donetsk, Luhansk and Mykolaiv oblasts. Amnesty International's Secretary General Agnès Callamard stated that there was "a pattern of Ukrainian forces putting civilians at risk and violating the laws of war when they operate in populated area." The Amnesty report sparked significant outrage in Ukraine and the West and Oksana Pokalchuk, head of Amnesty International in Ukraine, resigned from her post and left the organization in protest over the publication of the report. Amnesty's report was criticized by military and legal experts such as John Spencer, a specialist in urban warfare studies, who stated that advising Ukrainian forces not to be in urban areas did not make sense, as the circumstances of the war necessitated that. United Nations war crime investigator Marc Garlasco stated that the Amnesty report got the law wrong and also that Ukraine was making efforts to protect civilians, including helping them to relocate.

In mid-October 2022, the UN Independent International Commission of Inquiry on Ukraine released a report that included findings that both Russian and Ukrainian forces had "deployed their military assets and troops in ways that can endanger civilians."

== Analysis ==
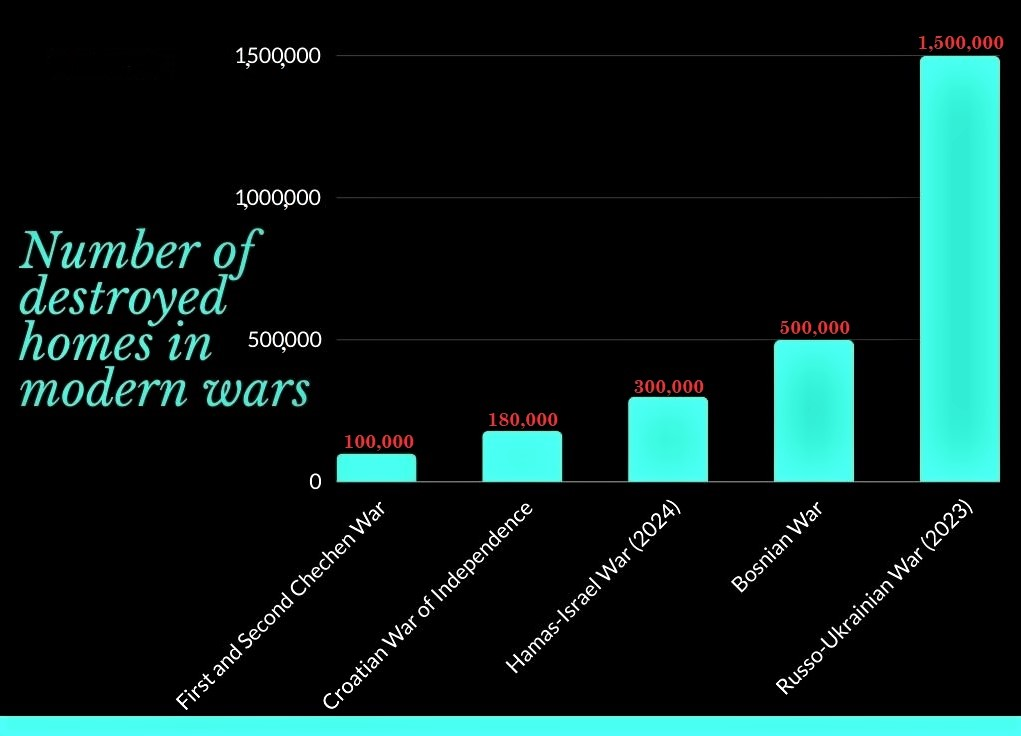
Total number of destroyed or damaged homes in Ukraine by 2025 compared to other modern wars

By January 2025, it is estimated Russia dropped 51,000 guided bombs on Ukraine. This is almost three times the amount compared to 19,000 guided bombs dropped by the US and the UK during the Iraq War. By February 2024, Russia had fired between 12,000,000 and 17,000,000 artillery shells against Ukraine. By comparison, the US Army fired 35,000 artillery shells in five months against Islamic State in the 2017 intervention in Syria, 60,000 artillery shells in the Gulf War, and 34,000 artillery shells in the 2003 invasion of Iraq.

Altogether, 3,404 civilians died in the War in Donbas (2014–2022). By comparison, after Russia's February 2022 full-scale invasion, 4,163 civilians died in March 2022, meaning that more civilians were killed in that one month alone than in the entire eight years of the Donbas War.

The Uppsala Conflict Data Program estimated that 95% of casualties in the siege of Mariupol were civilians—a civilian casualty ratio higher than the one in the Gaza War (83%) and the Srebrenica massacre (92%) and surpassed in modern times only by the Rwandan genocide.

No region in Ukraine was spared from Russian attacks. According to a Ukrainian estimate, only 3% of all Russian missiles, drones, and bombs hit military targets, while 97% hit civilian targets. By June 2023, UNDP estimated 1.5 million homes in Ukraine were either damaged or destroyed in the Russo-Ukrainian War. By comparison, approximately 2 million homes were damaged or destroyed in Ukraine during World War II.

The Kyiv School of Economics estimated in January 2024 that the total area of damaged or destroyed housing units in Ukraine caused by the war was 88,900,000 square metres (88.9 km^{2}) or 8.6% of the country's housing stock. This is 1.4 million households, leaving 3.4 million people homeless. Since 2022, half of all pregnancies in Ukraine resulted in preterm births due to war-related stress. By December 2024, the UN recorded 1,614 attacks on Ukrainian schools by Russian forces.

In 2024, UNICEF reported that 16 Ukrainian children were killed or injured every week in the war. UNICEF also estimates that 1.5 million Ukrainian children suffered from PTSD or other mental health problems related to the conflict. On average, Ukrainian children were hiding in underground bomb shelters for 920 hours (more than a month) in 2022. According to a study, trauma exposure in the first year of war encompassed 57% of children aged 7–17, and 45% of children aged 3–6. By 2025, approximately 70% of Ukrainian children, or 3.5 million, were experiencing material deprivation such as lack of food, clothing, heating at home, and access to education—an almost fourfold rise from only 18% who experienced this in 2021. Due to Russian attacks on infrastructure, one in three Ukrainian children lived without water supply or an operative sewage system at home. By February 2026, Russian attacks had killed more than 15,000 civilians according to ReliefWeb.

== See also ==
- War crimes in the Russian invasion of Ukraine
- Russian strikes against Ukrainian infrastructure (2022–present)
- Allegations of genocide of Ukrainians in the Russo-Ukrainian War
- Casualties of the Russo-Ukrainian War
- Russian war crimes
- War crimes in Donbas
- List of residential strikes during the Russian invasion (May 2022)
