= 7 March 2022 Mykolaiv military barracks attack =

7 March 2022 Russian attack on Ukrainian barracks in Mykolaiv

79th Air Assault Brigade military quarters attack in Mykolaiv
- Part of the Russian invasion of Ukraine
- Location: Mykolaiv, Mykolaiv Oblast, Ukraine
- Target: Ukrainian army barracks stationed at Mykolaiv
- Date: 7 March 2022; 05:15 – (UTC+02:00)
- Executed by: Russian Ground Forces
- Casualties: 16 killed and missing, dozens wounded
- Location within Ukraine

On 7 March 2022, during the battle for the city of Mykolaiv, during the Russian invasion on Ukraine, Russian Army forces launched an attack on the military barracks of Ukraine's 79th Air Assault Brigade, located at Soliany, a microdistrict of Mykolaiv. Initially ten servicemen, including officers, were declared dead, but the death toll later increased to 16 and dozens of wounded.

== Attack ==
On 7 March 2022 at 05:15, Russian forces launched BM-27 Uragan (Hurricane) missiles and struck a Ukrainian army barracks of the 79th Air Assault Brigade, killing ten soldiers and wounding dozens. The Major of Mykolaiv said that the attack on 05:15 on the military barracks, killed eight soldiers and wounded 19, while another eight were missing.

== Known victims ==
1. Ivanchuk Vadim Mykolayovich
2. Abessonov Andrey Vasilievich
3. Berezhok Vitaly Igorovich
4. Vakarchuk Valeriy Volodymyrovych
5. Svyatun Stanislav Vladislavovich
6. Chekhovsky Sergey Mykolayovich
7. Shevchenko Oleksiy Oleksiyovych
8. Shtepa Alexey Andreevich
9. Danilo Miroshnichenko
10. Taras Murtuzov

== See also ==
- Yavoriv military base attack - Another attack five days prior
- 18 March 2022 Mykolaiv military quarters attack - Another attack eleven days later on 36th Marine Brigade Headquarters in Mykolaiv
- Desna barracks airstrike - Another deadly attack on Ukrainian quarters
- Zarichne barracks airstrike - Another attack on Zaporizhzhia Oblast
- Makiivka military quarters shelling - Deadly attack on Russian forces on New year eve
- July 2022 Chasiv Yar missile strike - A Russian attack using the same type of laucher, Uragan.
