= 9K512 Uragan-1M =

Uragan-1M
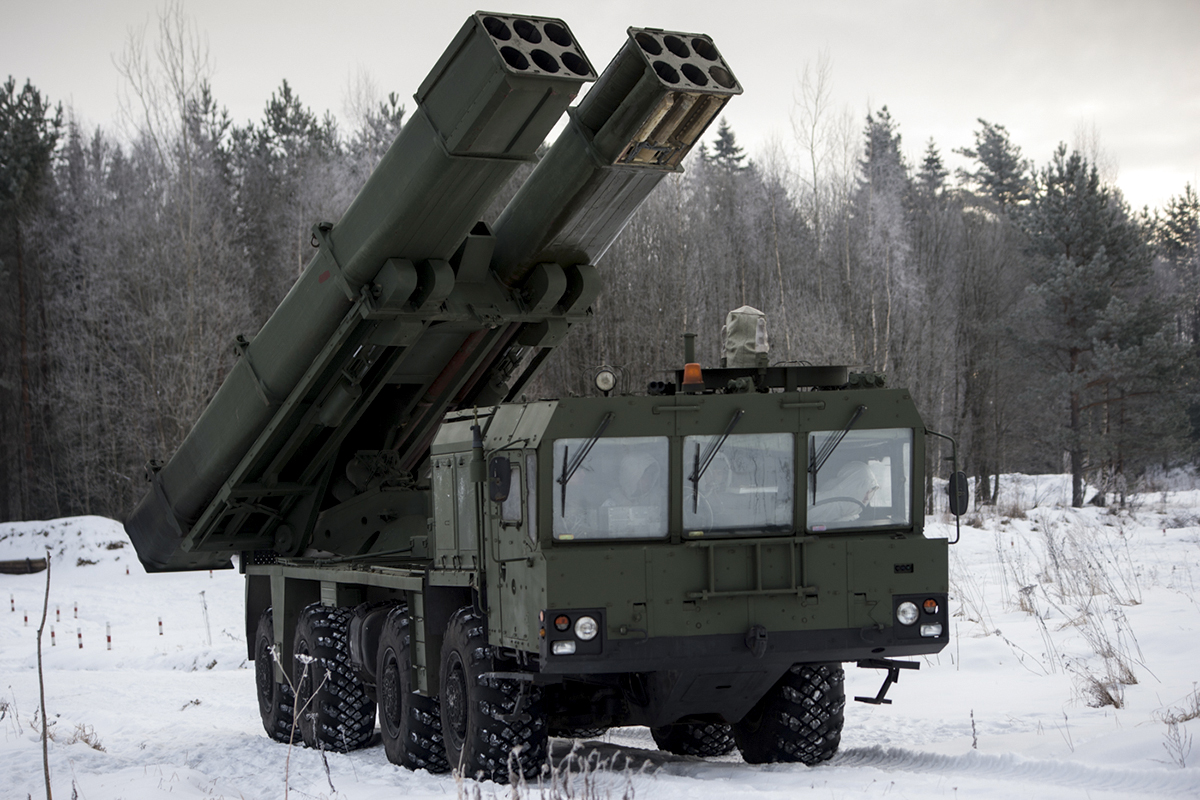
- Uragan-1M during training of cadets of the Mikhailovsky Military Artillery Academy.
- Type: Multiple rocket launcher
- Place of origin: Russia

Production history
- Designed: 1990s - 2000s

Specifications
- Mass: no more than 44,500 kg
- Length: 12,699 mm
- Width: 3,070 mm
- Caliber: 220 mm/300 mm
- Barrels: 30/12
- Maximum firing range: 200km/70km (300mm/220mm)
- Engine: YaMZ-846; 500 hp
- Suspension: 8x8
- Operational range: 1,000 km
- Maximum speed: 70 km/h

The 9K512 "Uragan-1M" is a Russian multicaliber (220 mm/300 mm) multiple rocket launcher with the ability to swap launch containers, allowing it to use the same missiles as the BM-30 Smerch and Tornado (multiple rocket launcher). It is a modernized version of the BM-27 Uragan.

== History ==
In the mid-1990s, Russia began developing a new 9K512 Uragan-1M bi-caliber rocket system. In 1995, the Bryansk Automobile Plant started designing a chassis based on the BAZ-6910 "Voshchina-1" for the new MLRS. However, due to a lack of funding, all work on its design was stopped at the end of 1996. Simultaneously, the designers at Motovilikha Plants explored the option of basing the system on the MZKT-7930 "Astrolog" chassis. After reviewing the projects, the Ministry of Defense chose the option of placing wheeled tractors on a chassis produced by the Minsk Plant. In this form, the new Uragan-1M MLRS entered testing.

In 2012, tests were conducted on the system. According to the state armament program of the Russian Federation, two regimental sets of Uragan-1M MLRS were to enter service with the ground forces in 2017. According to a report by the RAND Corporation, the initial eight Uragan-1Ms entered service with the 4th Guards Tank Division's 275th Self-Propelled Artillery Regiment around that time.

In December 2023, NPO Splav announced the start of deliveries of the Uragan-1M MLRS to the troops participating in the Russian invasion of Ukraine.

== Design ==
The 9K512 "Uragan-1M" can be fitted with two banks of six 300 mm launch tubes or fifteen 220 mm launch tubes. It can launch guided 220 mm rockets with a range of 70 km, or guided 300 mm rockets with a range up to 200km (9M544).

== See also ==
- Astros II MLRS – (Brazil)
- BM-24 – (Soviet Union) 240 mm multiple rocket launcher
- BM-30 Smerch – (Soviet Union) 300 mm heavy multiple rocket launcher
- Fajr-5 – (Iran) 333 mm rocket launcher
- Falaq-2 – (Iran) Unguided rocket launcher
- M142 HIMARS – (United States)
- Katyusha – (Soviet Union) BM-13 multiple rocket launchers of World War II
- MAR-290 – (Israel) heavy multiple rocket launcher
- MLRS M270 – (United States) 227 mm multiple rocket launcher
- Pinaka multi barrel rocket launcher – (India) 122 mm / 214 mm multiple rocket launcher
- TOROS – (Turkey) 230–260 mm rocket launcher
- 9A52-4 Tornado – (Russia) 122 mm / 220 mm / 300 mm universal multiple launch rocket system

== Bibliography ==
- Привалов А. (2013-04-23). "Свой частник хуже иностранца". Общероссийская еженедельная газета «Военно-промышленный курьер».
