= Zemledeliye (minelaying system) =

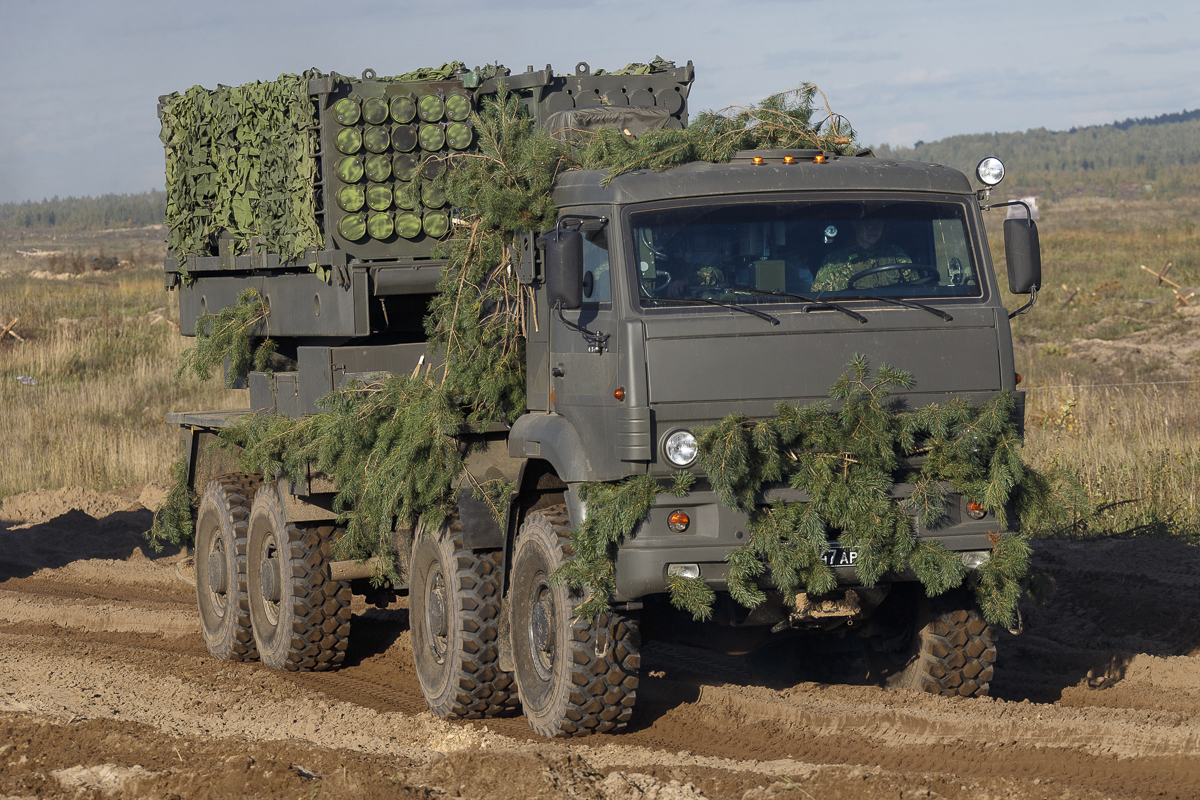
- Zemledeliye mine launcher
- Type: Remote minelayer Multiple rocket launcher
- Place of origin: Russian Federation

Service history
- In service: 2020–present
- Used by: Russian Armed Forces; Russian Engineer Troops
- Wars: Russo-Ukrainian war

Production history
- Designer: Splav State Research and Production Enterprise

Specifications
- Length: 10.3 m
- Width: 2.5 m
- Crew: 3
- Caliber: 122 mm
- Barrels: 50
- Maximum firing range: 15 km

Zemledeliye (Russian: Земледелие, lit. Agriculture) is a Russian remote minelaying system (Russian: инженерная система дистанционного минирования; ИСДМ or ISDM). It is designed for the rapid creation of minefields from a distance in particularly dangerous areas. The system is used during the Russo-Ukrainian war, most notably during 2023 Ukrainian counteroffensive.

== Development ==
In the 1970s, after military trials, the Soviet military declined to adopt a similar system based on the Grad and Uragan multiple launch rocket systems, due to their poor accuracy over long distances and the inability to control the configuration of the deployed minefield. Such a minefield could become a threat not only to the enemy, but also to friendly troops.

Russian military concluded tests of Zemledeliye system in late 2020, during the Caucasus 2020 exercises.

Sergey Chemezov said that in addition to missiles with mines, high-precision ammunition has also been developed for the weapon, and for their production a special workshop was built at the NPO Splav.

== Description ==
The operating principle of Zemledeliye is similar to a multiple launch rocket system (MLRS). Externally, the system somewhat resembles the Grad and Tornado-G MLRS and, like them, has 122 mm caliber, but for minelaying it uses ammunition with a solid fuel engine, filled with various types of mines. Each armored KamAZ carries two pods of 25 missiles loaded with mines. Their flight range is 5 to 15 km.

Course-corrected missiles allow the Zemledeliye to deploy a minefield in a matter of minutes. The system fires rockets that scatter mines at a given location. In accordance with the second protocol of the Geneva Convention, each mine is equipped with programmable self-destruct mechanisms. This ensures that minefields do not last forever, but are deactivated after a certain time without human intervention.

The complex consists of: a combat vehicle on an eight-wheeled KamAZ-6560 armored chassis, a transport-loading vehicle and launch containers with engineering ammunition. The combat vehicle is equipped with a satellite navigation system, a computer and a weather station, which allows it to make adjustments and take into account the influence of weather on the flight of missiles.

== Service history ==
In December 2020 Zemledeliye was reported to enter service with the Armed Forces of Russian Federation, and Rostec began supplying the system to troops.

Russia has used Zemledeliye during the Russo-Ukrainian war. Most notably it was deployed to repel the 2023 Ukrainian counteroffensive.

== Operators ==
- Russia
