= MAR-290 =

Israeli Multiple Launch Rocket System

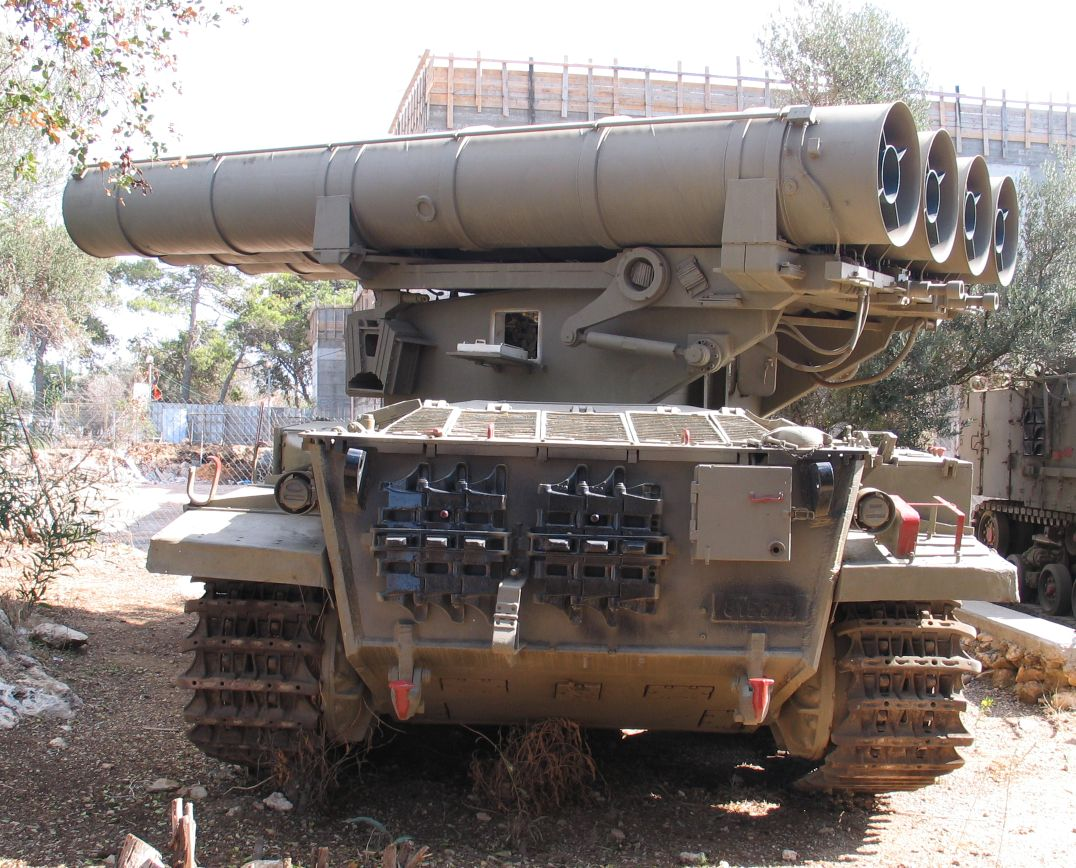
MAR-290 on centurion hull in Beit Ha-Totchan museum

The MAR-290 is an Israeli 290 mm (11.4 in) single-stage ground-to-ground multiple launch rocket system (MLRS) which was manufactured by Israel Military Industries (IMI) and introduced in 1973.

The rocket was based on the Soviet-made 240 mm (9.4 in) BM-24 MLRS. It has a maximum range of 42 km (26.1 mi) and was capable of firing two types of rockets, a high-explosive type named "Eivri", or a cluster type named "Chaviv".

The original launcher was based on an M4 Sherman chassis which was updated by IMI with a new Cummins VT-8-460 diesel engine. Another prototype of a Centurion-based MAR-290 named "Eshel Ha-Yarden" was created while another prototype launcher, based on an M548, was also tested by the Israeli Defence Force.

== Gallery ==
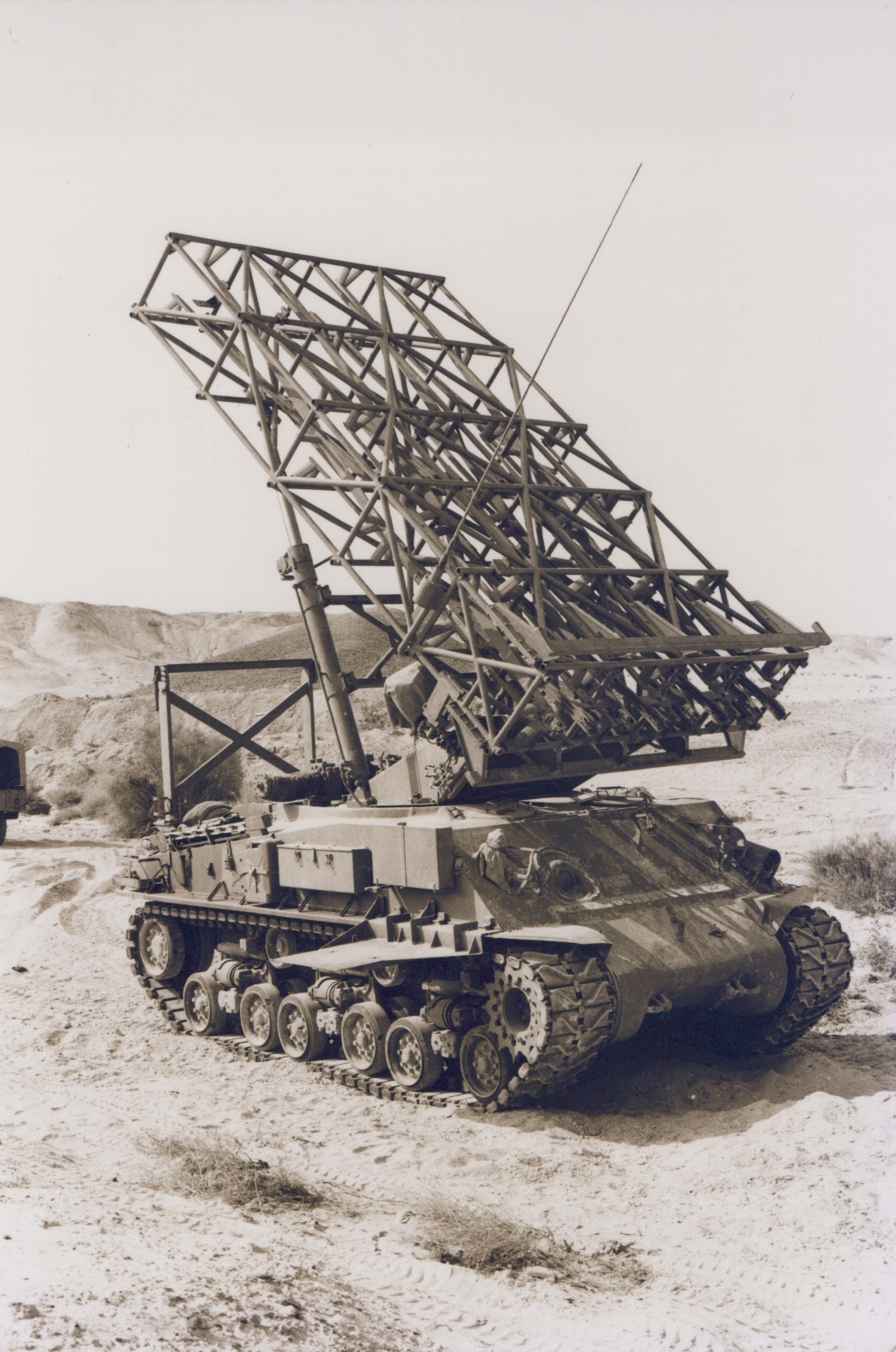
MAR-290 on M4 Sherman hull

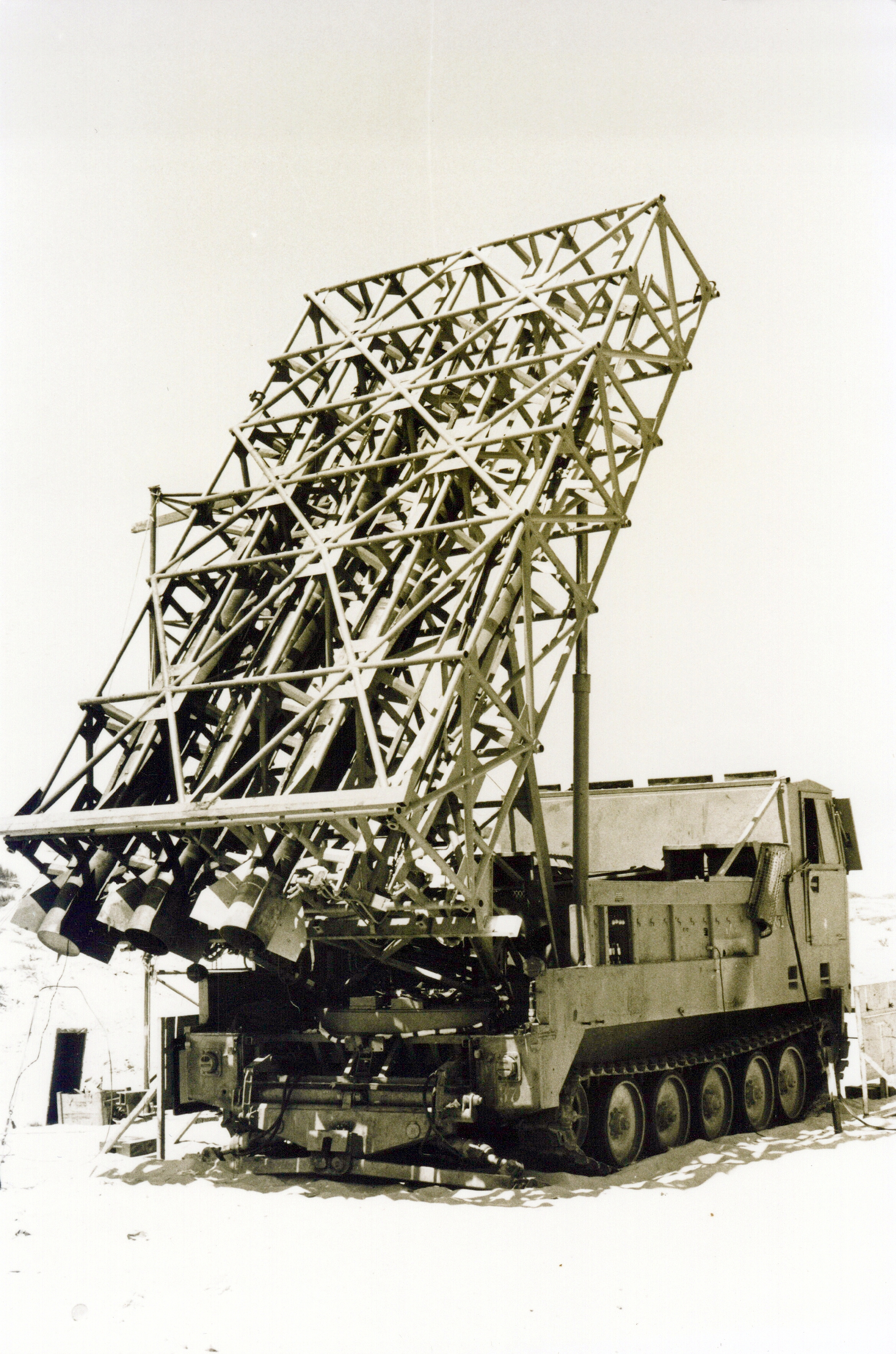
MAR-290 on M548

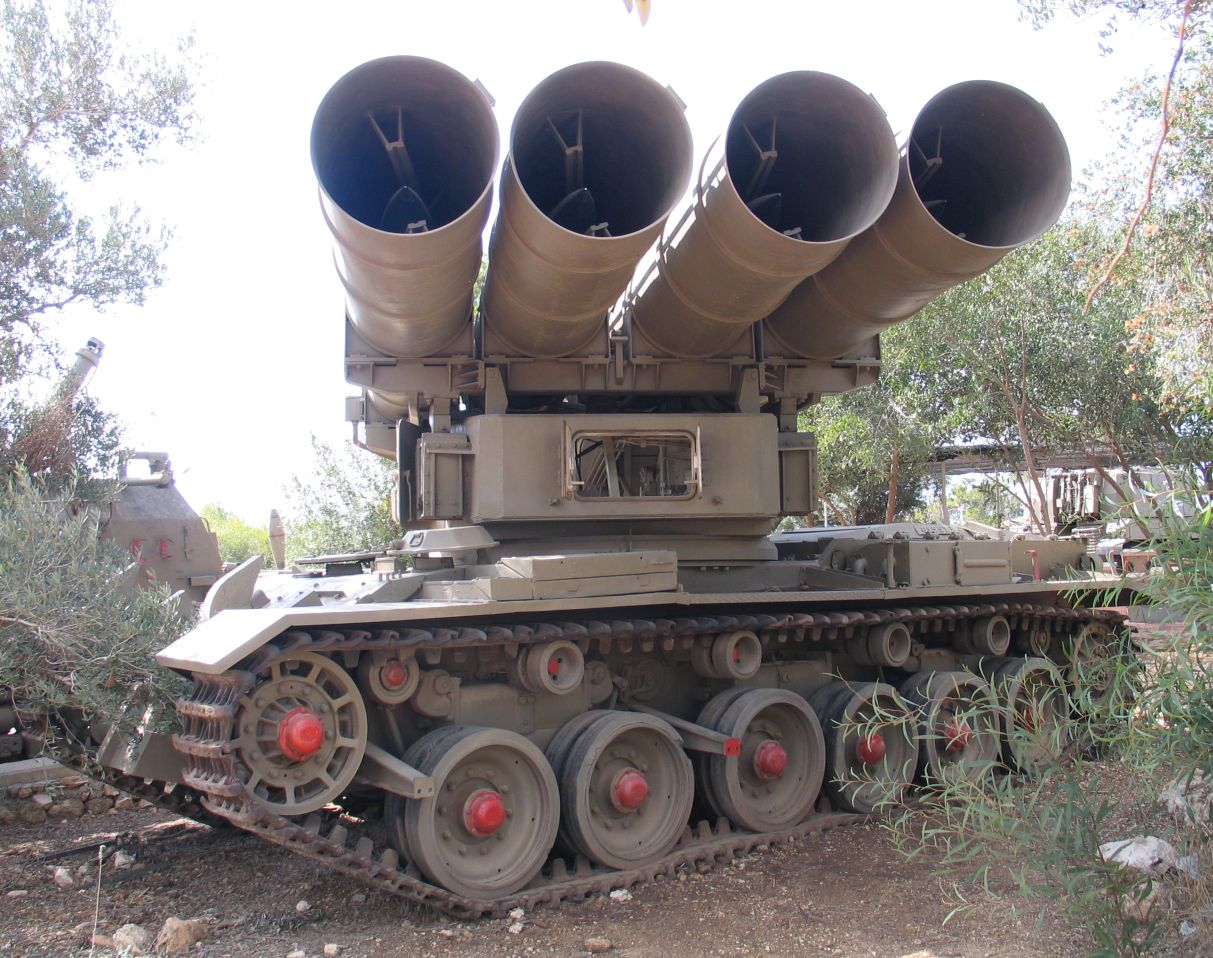
MAR-290 on Centurion hull

== See also ==
- LAR-160 – (Israel)
- ACCULAR – (Israel)
- T-122 Sakarya – (Turkey)
- Fajr-5 – (Iran)
- TOROS – (Turkey)
- Falaq-2 – (Iran)
- EXTRA – (Israel)
- Predator Hawk – (Israel)
- BM-27 Uragan – (Soviet Union)
- BM-30 Smerch – (Soviet Union)
