= BM-27 Uragan =

Soviet multiple launch rocket system

BM-27 Uragan (9P140) БМ-27 Ураган (9П140)
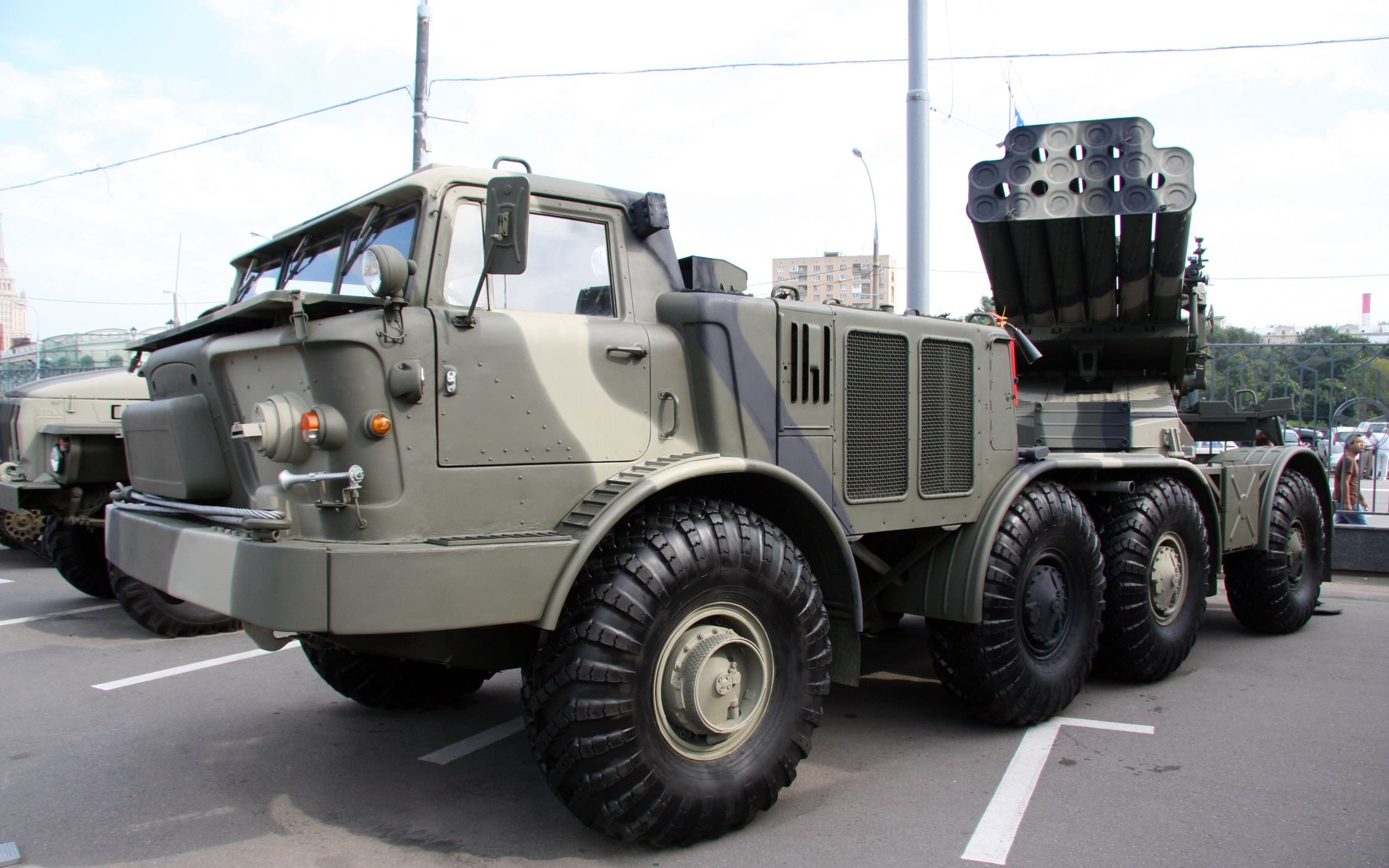
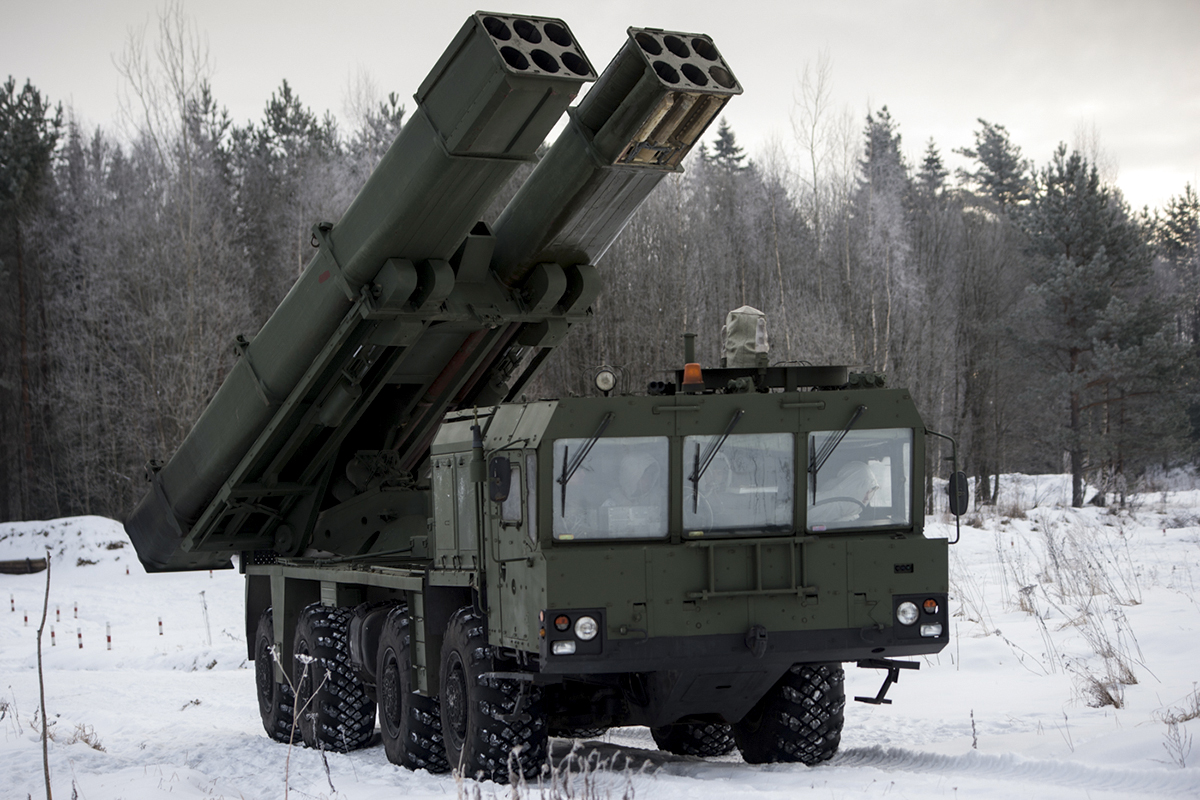
- BM-27 Uragan; BM-27M Uragan-1M
- Type: Multiple rocket launcher
- Place of origin: Soviet Union

Service history
- In service: 1975–present
- Used by: See Operators
- Wars: Soviet–Afghan War; Transnistria War; War in Abkhazia (1992–1993); First Chechen War; Second Chechen War; Russo-Georgian War; War in Donbas; Iran–Israel proxy conflict Syrian Civil War; Second Nagorno-Karabakh War; Russo-Ukrainian war

Production history
- Designer: Splav State Research and Production Enterprise
- Designed: 1970s
- Manufacturer: Splav State Research and Production Enterprise
- Produced: 1975–present
- Variants: See Variants

Specifications
- Mass: 20 tonnes (44,092 lbs)
- Crew: 6
- Calibre: 220 mm (8.66 in)
- Barrels: 16
- Effective firing range: 35 km (22 mi)
- Maximum firing range: >70km
- Sights: PG-1 panoramic telescope
- Engine: Two engines, with separate gearboxes and drive shafts, that are longitudinally mounted, one on each side of vehicle immediately behind cab
- Suspension: 8×8 wheeled
- Operational range: 500 km (311 mi)

The BM-27 Uragan (Russian: БМ-27 Ураган, lit. 'Hurricane'; GRAU index 9P140) is a self-propelled 220 mm multiple rocket launcher designed in the Soviet Union to deliver cluster munitions. The system began its service with the Soviet Army in the late 1970s, and was its first spin and fin stabilized heavy multiple rocket launcher.

An updated version known as Uragan-1M was commissioned in 2008. The truck vehicle has no similarities.

== Description ==
The BM-27 Uragan is capable of launching 220 mm rockets from 16 launch tubes mounted on the rear of a ZIL-135 8×8 chassis. This vehicle is extremely similar to that used in the Luna-M free flight rocket system. It has two gasoline engines that power its 20 tonnes to a maximum speed of 65 kilometers per hour. One engine drives the four wheels on the left of the truck, while the other engine drives the four wheels on the right. The ZIL-135 has eight wheel drive, but only the front and rear axles are used for steering. It has a maximum cruising range of 500 kilometers.

The cab of the ZIL-135 is NBC protected, allowing the rockets to be fired without exposing the crew to possible contaminants. The six-man crew can emplace or displace the system in three minutes.

Before firing, stabilizing jacks must be lowered and the blast shield raised to protect the cab and its occupants. Indirect fire aiming is achieved with the use of a PG-1 panoramic telescope. Although there are no night vision sights, the driver of the launch vehicle is equipped with a night vision device.

The BM-27 can use HE-FRAG, chemical, explosive or scatterable mine (PTM-3 or PFM-1) submunition equipped rockets, all of which are detonated by electric timing fuses. (However, chemical munitions have been officially off service in Russia since 2017.) Each rocket weighs 280.4 kilograms. The warheads weigh between 90 and 100 kilograms, depending on type. A full salvo of 16 rockets can be fired in 20 seconds and can engage targets within a range of 35 kilometers.

Because of the size of the warhead, the range of the rocket and the speed that a salvo can be delivered, the BM-27 is very effective at mine laying. Each 220 mm rocket can scatter 312 anti-personnel PFM-1 mines. Minefields can be laid behind a retreating enemy or even be used to trap an enemy by encircling them with mines. Tactics such as this were often used by the Soviets in Afghanistan.

Once the rockets have been fired, 9T452 (another ZIL-135 based vehicle) is used to assist in reloading. It carries additional rockets and a crane to transfer the rockets from the reload vehicle to the launcher. The entire reloading procedure takes around 20 minutes.

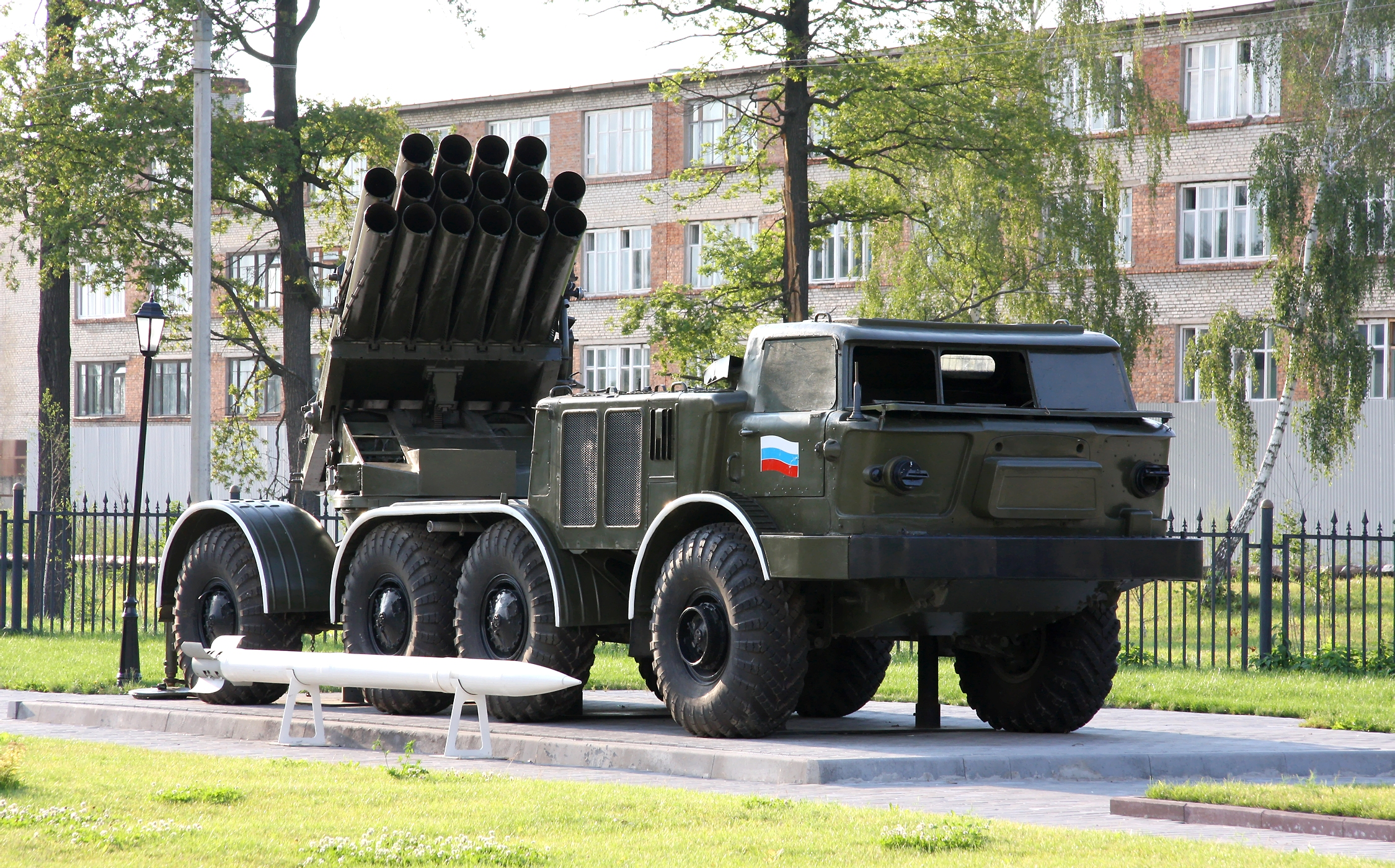
The 9P140 missile launcher vehicle as a monument to A.N. Ganichev near Splav State Research and Production Enterprise, Tula city

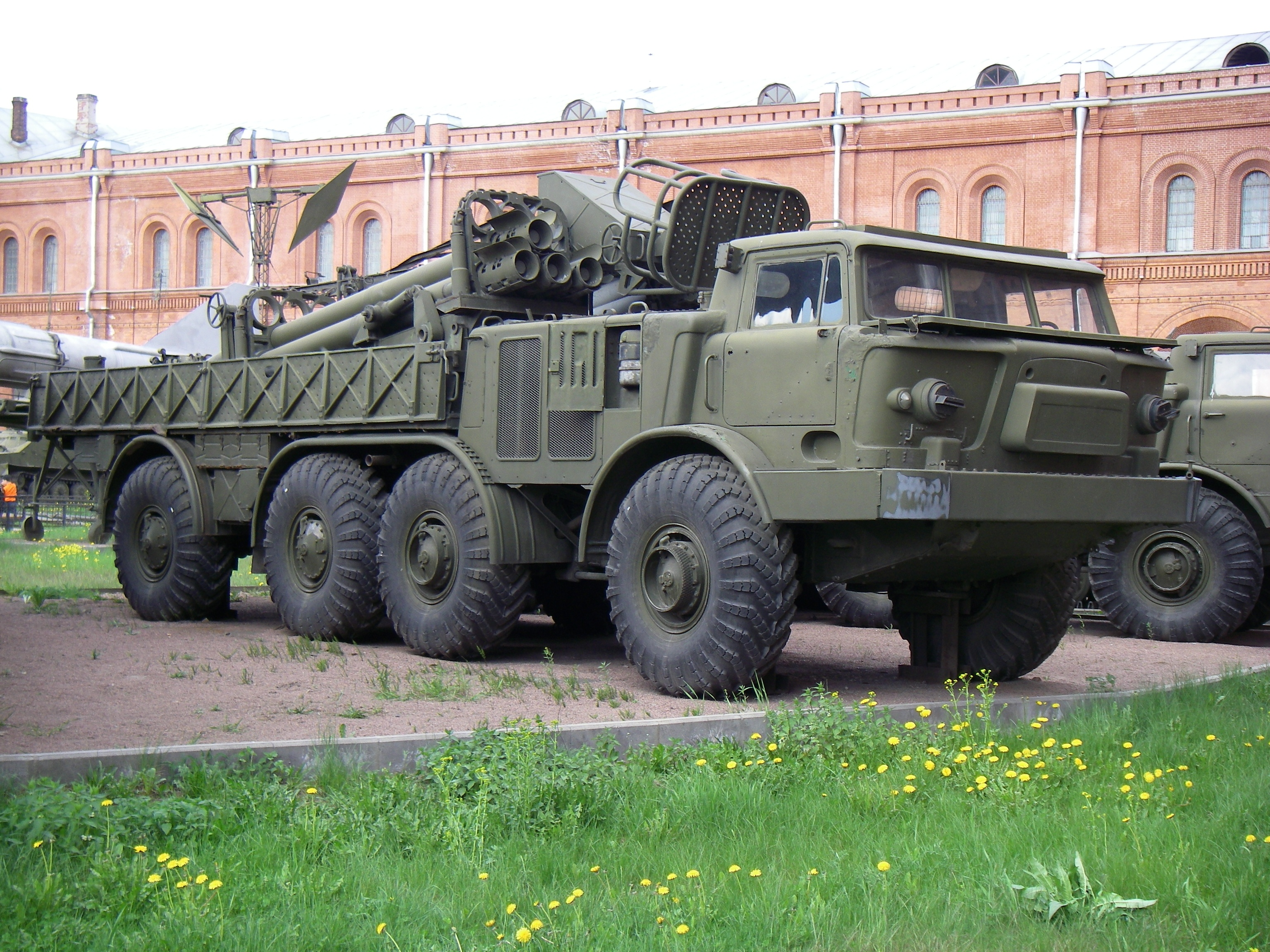
The 9T452 transporter-loader vehicle at the St Petersburg Artillery Museum

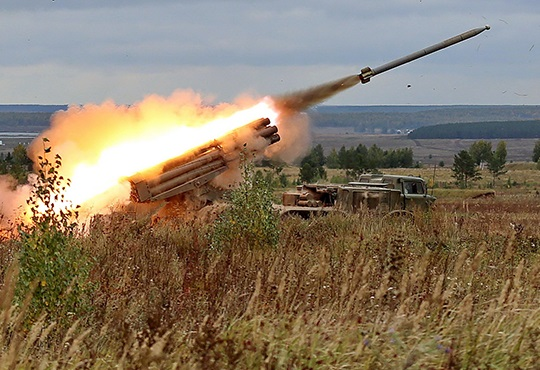
Uragan firing

BM-27 Uragan ammunition, bottom to top, left to right: 9M27F, 9M27K2, 9M27K, 9M27K3, 9M27S

=== Rockets ===
	9M27F	9M27K1	9M27K2	9M27K3	9M59
Diameter	220 mm				
Length	4.832 m (15.85 ft)	5.178 m (16.99 ft)		5.2 m (17 ft)	5.178 m (16.99 ft)
Weight	280 kg (620 lb)	270 kg (600 lb)			
Warhead	100 kg (220 lb) unitary HE-Frag (51.7 kg (114 lb) of HE)	90 kg (200 lb) container for 30 9N210 anti-material bomblets	89.5 kg (197 lb) container for 24 PGMDM/PTM-1 anti-tank mines	90 kg container for 312 PFM-1 anti-personnel mines	89.5 kg container for 9 PTM-3 directional charge bottom attack anti-tank mines
Range	10–35 km (6.2–21.7 mi)			8–34 km (5.0–21.1 mi)	10–35 km

Also 9M27S incendiary rockets.

=== Operational history ===
- On 7 March 2022, Russian forces attacked the Ukrainian military barracks on Mykolayv killing and wounding several soldiers.
- On 9 July 2022, a missile attack on Chasiv Yar left at least 48 persons killed. A Uragan launcher was employed.

== Variants ==
- 9P140 Uragan: Standard variant on ZIL-135 truck.

=== Uragan-M ===
- Uragan-1M: Variant presented to the public in 2007; all processes are automated. Can also fire the 300 mm rockets of the BM-30 Smerch system. Reloading is simplified by substituting barrels; can be fitted with two banks of six 300 mm launch tubes or fifteen 220 mm launch tubes. Deliveries to the Russian Army started as of September 2016. Can fire guided 220 mm rockets with a range of 70 km (43 mi). On Belarusian MZKT 8x8 military truck chassis.

=== Uragan-U ===
- 9A53 Uragan-U: Successor with 2 × 15 launch tubes; presented in 2009 on 8×8 MZKT-7930. Thanks to its modular assembly the BM-30 Smerch and BM-21 Grad rockets can also be fired.

=== Ukrainian models ===
Bureviy multiple rocket launcher

- Bastion-03: Prototype by Ukrainian company AvtoKrAZ, presented in 2010. Installed on a 6×6 truck type KrAZ-63221RA.
- Bureviy (meaning "Storm"): Prototype by Ukroboronprom involving a new digital fire control system capable of target sharing and mounted on a Tatra 8x8 T815-7T3RC1 chassis, which can fire with modified armament up to 65 km (40 mi).

== Operators ==
BM-27 Uragan in Russian service. 23 August 2018.

=== Current operators ===
- Angola – 3-4 BM-27M Uragan-M in service as of 2024.
- Belarus – 36 in service as of 2024.
- Eritrea – 9 in service as of 2024.
- Guinea – 3 in service as of 2024.
- Kyrgyzstan – 6 in service as of 2024.
- Moldova – 11 in service as of 2024.
- Russia – 218 BM-27 Uragan and 6 BM-27M Uragan-M in service with a further 550 Uragan in storage as of 2024.
- Syria – An unknown number in service as of 2024. Serviceability is uncertain. 36 received from Russia in 1987–88.
- Turkmenistan – 60 in service as of 2024.
- Ukraine – 35 BM-27 Uragan and Bureviy in service as of 2024.
- Uzbekistan – 48 in service as of 2024.
- Libya – At least 2 in service as of 2026.<https://x.com/i/status/207878314150718299"/>

=== Former operators ===
- Afghanistan – 180 (not functional)
- Georgia – Saw limited usage during Abkhazia War, out of service.
- Kazakhstan – 180 were in storage in 2016. No longer in service.
- Soviet Union: Passed on to successor states.
- Tajikistan –
- Tanzania –
- Yemen – Over 50. Saw intensive action in the ongoing civil war. Does not appear to be in service as of 2024. 7 received from Moldova in 1994.

== See also ==
- Astros II – Brazilian long-range multiple launch rocket system
- BM-24 – Russian multiple rocket launcher
- BM-30 Smerch – Soviet/Russian multiple launch rocket system
- Fajr-5 – Iranian long-range multiple launch rocket system
- Falaq-2 – Iranian multiple launch rocket system
- M142 HIMARS – American artillery rocket system
- Katyusha – Soviet/Russian multiple launch rocket system BM-13 of World War II
- MAR-290 – Israeli Multiple Launch Rocket System
- M270 Multiple Launch Rocket System – American armored self-propelled artillery
- Pinaka multi-barrel rocket launcher – Indian long-range multiple launch rocket system
- TOROS – Turkish long-range multiple launch rocket system
- 9A52-4 Tornado – Russian long-range multiple launch rocket system

== Bibliography ==
- Prenatt, Jamie; Hook, Adam (2016). Katyusha – Russian Multiple Rocket Launchers 1941–Present. New Vanguard 235. Oxford: Osprey Publishing. ISBN 978-1-4728-1086-1.
- International Institute for Strategic Studies (February 2016). The Military Balance 2016. Vol. 116. Routlegde. ISBN 9781857438352.
- International Institute for Strategic Studies (February 2021). The Military Balance 2021. Vol. 121. Routledge. ISBN 9781032012278.
