= 18 March 2022 Mykolaiv military quarters attack =

2022 Russian attack in Ukraine

Mykolaiv military quarters attack
- Part of the Russian invasion of Ukraine
- Location: Mykolaiv, Mykolaiv Oblast, Ukraine
- Target: Ukrainian army barracks stationed at Mykolaiv
- Date: 18 March 2022; 23:57 – 0:01 (UTC+02:00)
- Executed by: Russian Ground Forces
- Casualties: 110 killed 100 wounded
- Location within Ukraine

On 18 March 2022, amid the battle for the city of Mykolaiv, during the Russian invansion on Ukraine, Russian Army forces launched an attack on Ukrainian military quarters located at the northern suburbs of Mykolaiv. Causing more than 200 killed and wounded. The quarters were inhabited by servicemen from the 137th Independent Marine Batalion and the 36th Marine Brigade.

== Attack ==
On 18 March, two Russian Kalibr missiles, fired from either nearby Kherson or Crimea, struck a Ukrainian army barracks of the 36th Separate Marine Brigade (headquartered in Mykolaiv), used to train local soldiers, located in the northern suburbs of Mykolaiv. The attack occurred during the night, while the soldiers were asleep in their bunks. Not enough time was available to sound the alarm, as the missiles were fired from too close, from the vicinity of Kherson.

== Casualties ==
The same day of the attack, the Belgian newspaper Het Laatste Nieuws reported that the city morgue and the Ukrainian army stated that at least 80 Ukrainian soldiers were killed, and their bodies recovered. However, the BBC reported that out of the 200 soldiers in the barracks, only one man was pulled from out of the rubble 30 hours after the attack. Another 50 were wounded. Two years after the attack, Ukrainian media updated the toll to 110 killed and 100 wounded servicemen.

== Known victims ==
1. Boyko Andrii Mykhailovych
2. Maksim Aleksandrovych Ivanov
3. Dmytro Ihorovych Darmoroz
4. Volodymyr Valentinovych Kryvenko
5. Shynkaryuk Oleg Petrovych
6. Mykola Mykolayovych Bolokan
7. Zadorozhnyi Ivan Volodymyrovych
8. Evenko Boris Yuriyovych
9. Perejod Eduard Mykhailovych
10. Antonenko Evgeny Leonidovych
11. Vitaly Bargilevich
12. Ivan Bykov
13. Yuri Nerubaysky
14. Nikolai Dudka
15. Eduard Valentinovych Lavrynenko
16. Merkuryev Oleksandr Viktorovych
17. Oleksiy Mykolayovych Levchenko
18. Pavlo Gonchar
19. Mykola Volodymyrovych Korniychuk
20. Artur Anatoliyovych Morgun
21. Leonid Igorovich Chebotar
22. Ivan Vasyliovych Lipskyi
23. Ivanov Valery Serhiyovych
24. Anton Rotar
25. Nakonechny Serhiy Anatoliyovych
26. Serhii Olegovich Shyshkovsky
27. Evgeny Viktorovych Shpichka
28. Oleksandr Dyachenko
29. Korsya Vyacheslav Vasyliovych
30. Valentin Volodymyrovych Bagnyuk
31. Mykhailo Volodymyrovych Skuba
32. Mykhailo Mykolayovych Kravchuk
33. Oleksandr Viktorovych Sydorchuk
34. Vitaliy Yuriyovych Volodko
35. Dmytro Sergeyevich Uvarov
36. Ihor Oleksandrovych Shapovalov
37. Anton Kostyantynovich
38. Oleksiy Lunyov
39. Evgeny Avramenko
40. Varzar Oleksandr
41. Oleksandr Andreyovych Kholyavko
42. Volodymyr Volodymyrovych Galushko
43. Viktor Grigoriev
44. Serhii Mykhailovych Luchko
45. Dmytro Ihorovych Tsigol
46. Rotarian Anton
47. Oganezov Serhiy Serhiyovych
48. Blazhko Viktor Viktorovych
49. Oleksandr Evgenovich Goryachko
50. Maxim Melnyk
51. Osadchy Teodor Valentinovych
52. Kravets Vladyslav Vasyliovych
53. Valery Mykhailovych Samofalov
54. Pavlo Borysovych Hamyk
55. Ivan Diskalenko
56. Dmitry Kiritsa
57. Andriy Palamarchuk

== See also ==
- Yavoriv military base attack - Another attack five days prior
- Desna barracks airstrike - Another deadly attack on Ukrainian quarters
- Zarichne barracks airstrike - Another attack on Zaporizhzhia Oblast
- Makiivka military quarters shelling - Deadly attack on Russian forces on New year eve
