= Falaq-1 =

Iranian rocket system

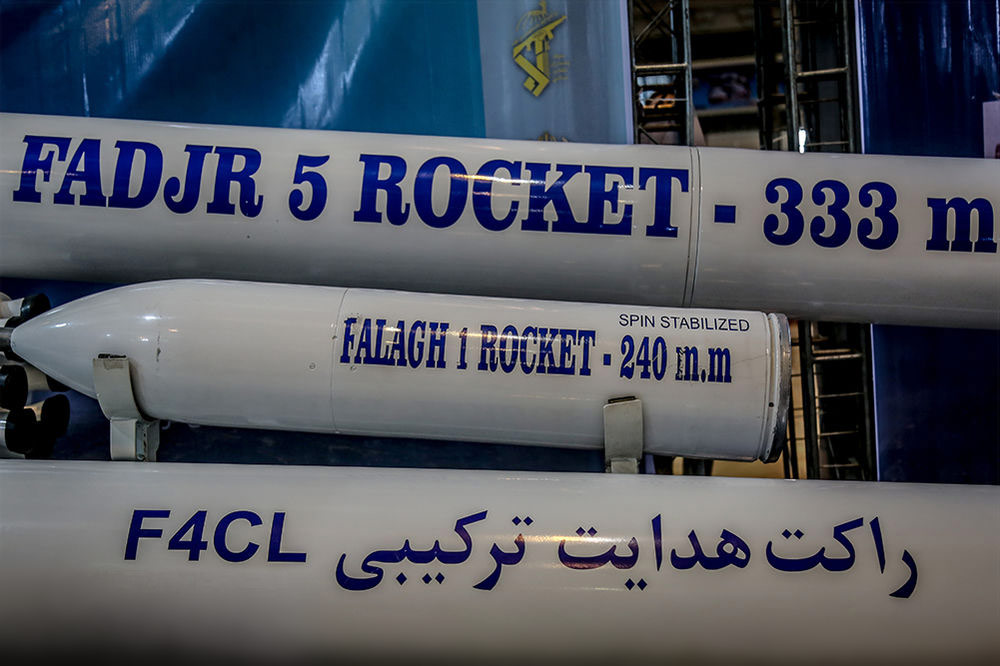
A Falaq-1 rocket in the centre

The Falaq-1 is an Iranian-made rocket system.

== Design ==
The 240 mm unguided surface-to-surface rocket is very similar to the rocket used with the Russian 240 mm (12-round) BM-24 system. The Falaq-1 has a bore of 240 mm, and a weight of 111 kg, with the warhead weighing 50 kg. The 240 mm spin-stabilised rockets have a maximum range of 10,000 m and are fitted with a nose-mounted fuze. Propellant used is of the solid double-base type. The rocket is mounted on a 4 × 4 jeep light cross-country vehicle which has six 240 mm rockets in the ready-to-launch position in a frame-type launcher on the rear.

Its successor, the Falaq-2, is a 333 mm-diameter rocket.

== Development ==
The system was developed in the 1990s by Shahid Bagheri Industrial Group, which is part of the Aerospace Industries Organization.

== Deployment ==
There is extensive evidence Falaq-1 rockets have been used in the Syrian civil war.

On 26 January 2024, Hezbollah claimed for the first time to have used the Falaq-1 in an attack against the Israel Defense Forces as part of the Israel–Hezbollah conflict during the Gaza war.

== Operators ==
- Iran
- Syria
- Hezbollah

== See also ==
- Falaq-2
