= Tornado (multiple rocket launcher) =

Russian long-range multiple launch rocket system

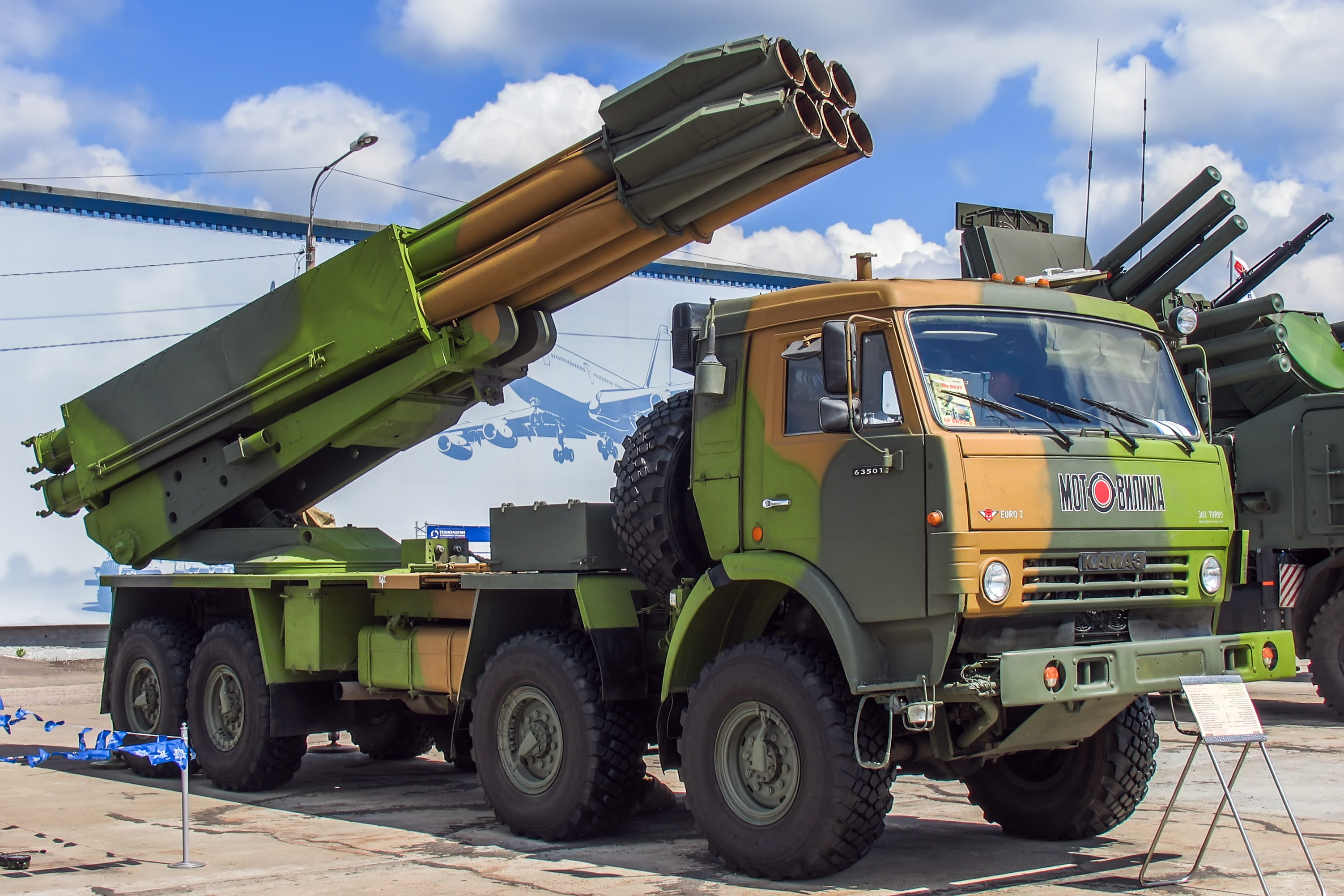
- 9A52-4 Smerch combat vehicle at Engineering Technologies 2012
- Type: Multiple rocket launcher
- Place of origin: Russia

Service history
- In service: 2014–present
- Wars: Syrian Civil War; Russo-Ukrainian War

Production history
- Designer: Motovilikha Plants
- Designed: 2000s
- Manufacturer: NPO Splav
- Produced: 2011–present
- No. built: More than 200 units in service
- Variants: 9A53-G Tornado, 9A53-S Tornado

Specifications
- Mass: 24.65 t
- Length: 11.2 m
- Width: 2.5 m
- Height: 3.15 m
- Crew: 2
- Caliber: 122 mm/300 mm
- Barrels: 40/12,6
- Maximum firing range: 200 km (300 mm 9M544 rocket)
- Main armament: 9M55 or 9M528 rockets
- Engine: KamAZ-740.50.360 diesel 360 hp
- Suspension: 8×8 wheeled
- Operational range: 1,000 km
- Maximum speed: 90 km/h

The Tornado is a family of multiple rocket launchers of 122 to 300mm calibre developed by NPO Splav for the Russian Ground Forces Variants of the system, which include the Tornado-G and Tornado-S models, have different capabilities and roles in the battlefield. The Tornado is designed primarily to fire cluster munitions but also can be used to fire thermobaric warheads.

== Variants ==
The 9A52-4 Tornado system is a lightweight rocket launcher. There are two other systems. A modular MLRS based on the MZKT-79306 truck, which can carry two BM-27 Uragan or BM-30 Smerch launcher modules, and one based on the Kamaz 6×6 truck. The "Tornado-G" system is an upgrade package for the existing BM-21 Grad. The Russian government ordered 36 new "Tornado-G" based on the Kamaz 6x6 chassis, instead of the old systems based on the Ural-4320 truck.

Systems in the Tornado family:

- 9A53-G Tornado (2 × 15; 1×40 122 mm Upgraded BM-21 Grad Multiple Rocket Launcher Module, based on a Kamaz Truck or on a Ural-4320).
- 9A53-S Tornado (2 × 6; 2×4 300 mm Upgraded BM-30 Smerch Multiple Rocket Launcher Modules, based on a MZKT-79306).

=== Tornado-G ===
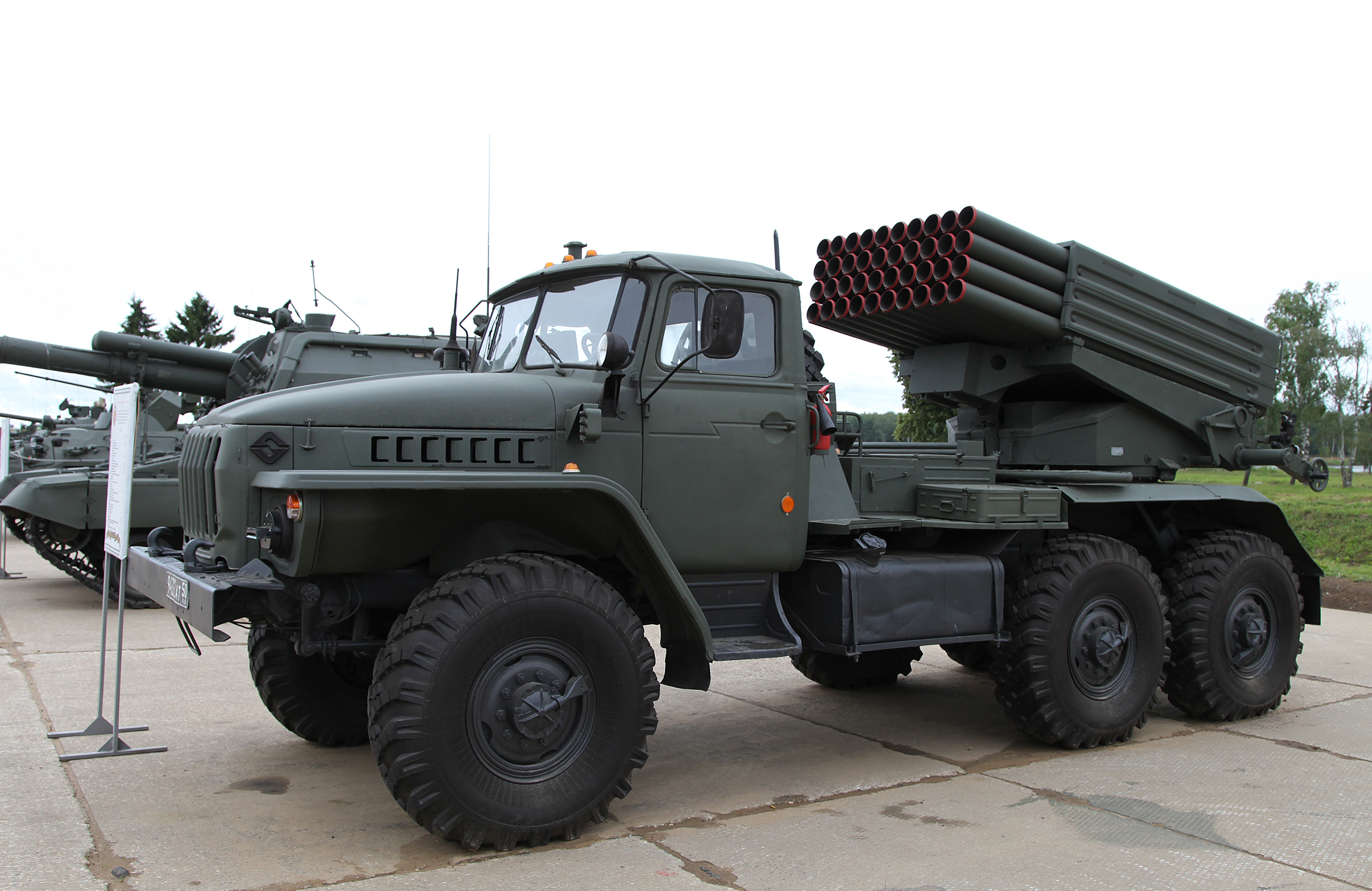
A 9K51M Tornado-G

The Tornado-G system seen at right has four rows of 10 launch tubes. Each tube launches one 122mm projectile. The Tornado-G model is aimed at replacing the BM-21 Grad multiple rocket launcher. Currently the sole operator is Russian Ground Forces. A version will be approved for export.

Russian ground forces received about 30 Tornado-G systems in 2011, replacing the BM-21 Grad.

Tornado-G received export permission in June 2018 and Tornado-S with 120 km range satellite-guided shells in August 2019. The three upgraded 122 mm Grad high explosive (HE) with fragmentation (HE-Frag), and HE with high-explosive anti-tank (HE/HEAT) rocket variants for the Tornado-G multiple launch rocket system (MLRS) codenamed 9M538, 9M539, and 9M541 have a significant increase in firepower, but with less range. BM-21 Grad systems are being upgraded to the level of new-generation Tornado-G systems.

The Tornado-G entered series production in 2013. The system entered service with the Russian armed forces in 2014.

=== Tornado-S ===
The improved Tornado-S 9K515 MLRS, which delivers up to 12 missiles of 300mm diameter, was upgraded with the special GLONASS satellite navigation system used in the BM-30 Smerch missile system. The Tornado-S has guided rocket rounds with a range of 120 km (75 mi). The Tornado-S has a longer range and increased effectiveness, due to the use of new warhead payloads and a reduced launch readiness time of just three minutes.

The Tornado-S was approved for service in July–August 2016 and started its serial deliveries. 20 Tornado-S vehicles ordered in summer 2019. A new order was made in August 2020. More missiles ordered in August 2022 and again in August 2023.

Russian forces used the Tornado-S during the Russo-Ukrainian war.

=== 9A52-4 ===
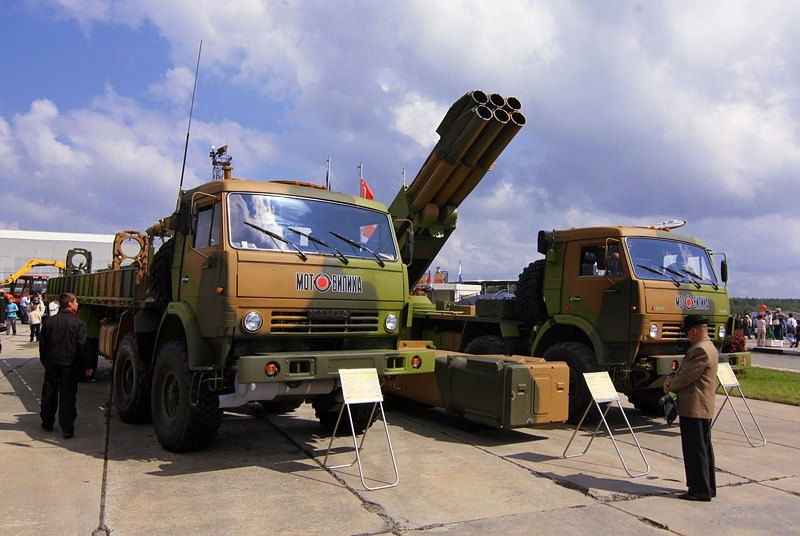
A 9A52-4 launcher vehicle (right) and 9T234-4 reloading vehicle (left), Perm, RussianExpoArms, 2009.

Janes describes the 9A52-4 Tornado as a lighter variant of the Tornado-S launcher. The 300 mm multiple rocket launcher was first unveiled in 2007 as a more strategically and tactically mobile launcher, albeit at the expense of a slight reduction in firepower.

The 9A52-4 Tornado system is based on the chassis of the KamAZ-63501 8×8 military truck, which provides good tactical mobility. It is equipped with a single container with six launcher tubes for 300-mm rockets, which can fire all current Smerch rockets, including HE-FRAG, incendiary, thermobaric, cluster with anti-personnel or anti-tank mines. Cluster rounds may also carry self-targeting anti-tank munitions.

The 800 kg standard rocket has a maximum range of 90 km. A range and direction correction system provides better accuracy compared to its predecessors. The 9A52-4 can launch rockets singularly, by a partial ripple or by a full salvo, which can cover an area of 32 hectares. A full salvo can be fired within 20 seconds. The 9A52-4 launching vehicle can be reloaded within 8 minutes.

Launcher pods are designed for use with 122 mm and 220 mm rockets. The weapons system is equipped with an automated laying and fire control system, along with an autonomous satellite navigation and positioning system. Positioning and firing data are exchanged between the launch vehicle and the command vehicle.

== General characteristics ==
=== 9A52-4 Tornado ===
- Chassis: Kamaz-63501
- Salvo Time: 6 rounds in 20 seconds
- Reload Time: 8 min

== Rocket projectiles ==
Tornado-S 300 mm

| Variant | | Rocket | | | Warhead | | Self-destruct time | Range | |
| Name | Type | Mass | Weight | Length | Weight | Submunition | Self-destruct time | Min. | Max. |
|---|---|---|---|---|---|---|---|---|---|
| 9M55K | Cluster munition, anti-personnel | 1,934 kg | 800 kg | 7.6 m | 243 kg | 72 × 1.75 kg, each with 96 fragments (4.5 g each) | 110 s | 20 km | 70 km |
| 9M55K1 | Cluster munition, self-guided anti-tank | 1,934 kg | 800 kg | 7.6 m | 243 kg | 5 × 15 kg (70 mm RHA armor-piercing) | | 20 km | 70 km |
| 9M55K4 | Cluster munition, anti-tank minelets | 1,934 kg | 800 kg | 7.6 m | 243 kg | 25 × 4.85 kg mines | 16-24 hour | 20 km | 70 km |
| 9M55K5 | Cluster munition, high-explosive anti-tank/high-explosive fragmentation | 1,934 kg | 800 kg | 7.6 m | 243 kg | 646 × 0.25 kg (120 mm RHA armor-piercing) | 130-260 s | 25 km | 70 km |
| 9M55K6 | Projectile with self-aiming armor penetration submunitions | 1,934 kg | 800 kg | 7.6 m | 243 kg | 5 × 17.3 kg | | 25 km | 70 km |
| 9M55F | separable high-explosive fragmentation | 1,934 kg | 800 kg | 7.6 m | 258 kg | | | 25 km | 70 km |
| 9M55S | Thermobaric | 1,934 kg | 800 kg | 7.6 m | 243 kg | | | 25 km | 70 km |
| 9M525 | Cluster munition, anti-personnel | 1,964 kg | 815 kg | 7.6 m | 243 kg | 72 × 1.75 kg | 110 s | 25 km | 90 km |
| 9M526 | Cluster munition, self-guided anti-tank | 1,964 kg | 815 kg | 7.6 m | 243 kg | 5 × 15 kg (70 mm RHA armor-piercing) | | 25 km | 90 km |
| 9M527 | Cluster munition, anti-tank minelets | 1,964 kg | 815 kg | 7.6 m | 243 kg | 25 × 4.85 kg mines | 16-24 hour | 25 km | 90 km |
| 9M528 | Cluster munition, high-explosive anti-tank/high-explosive fragmentation | 1,964 kg | 815 kg | 7.6 m | 243 kg | 95 kg 800 fragments (50 g each) | | 25 km | 90 km |
| 9M529 | Thermobaric | 1,964 kg | 815 kg | 7.6 m | 243 kg | Thermal field lifetime 1,440 ms | 110-160 s | 25 km | 90 km |
| 9M530 | Penetrating high-explosive | 1,964 kg | 815 kg | 7.6 m | 243 kg | 75 kg, (Volume of ejected soil 160 m3) | | 25 km | 90 km |
| 9M531 | High-explosive anti-tank fragmentation | 1,964 kg | 815 kg | 7.6 m | 243 kg | 616 × 0.24 kg (120 mm RHA armor-piercing) | 130-260 s | 25 km | 90 km |
| 9M532 | Self-aiming submunitions ( against armored vehicles and tanks) | 1,964 kg | 815 kg | 7.6 m | 243 kg | 20 × 6.7 kg (70 mm RHA armor-piercing) | | 25 km | 90 km |
| 9M533 | Self-aiming submunitions (against groups of armored vehicles and tanks) | 1,964 kg | 815 kg | 7.6 m | 243 kg | 5 × 17.25 kg (120 mm RHA armor-piercing) | | 25 km | 90 km |
| 9М542 | Satellite-guided (GLONASS), high-explosive fragmentation | | 820 kg | 7.6 m | 250 kg | 70kg, 500 fragments (50g each) | | 40 km | 120 km |

A new longer range (possibly 200 km) high precision missile 9M544 for the Tornado-S system with high-explosive anti-tank fragmentation munitions was tested in 2020.

== Operators ==
=== Tornado-G ===
- Russia: Russian Ground Forces (180)

=== Tornado-S ===
- Russia: Russian Ground Forces (~50)

== See also ==
- Katyusha, BM-13, BM-8, and BM-31 multiple rocket launchers of World War II
- BM-14 140 mm multiple rocket launcher
- BM-21 Grad 122 mm multiple rocket launcher
- BM-27 Uragan 220 mm multiple rocket launcher
- M270, U.S. multiple rocket launcher
- Pinaka multi barrel rocket launcher Indian 122 mm / 214 mm multiple rocket launcher
- T-122 Sakarya 122 mm rocket launcher
- Fajr-5 333 mm rocket launcher
- TOROS 230–260 mm rocket launcher
- Falaq-2 Unguided rocket launcher
- HIMARS U.S. downsized derivative version of M270
- TOS-1 Buratino Heavy Flame Thrower System (multiple rocket, thermobaric weapon launcher)
