= NPO Splav =

Russian armaments manufacturer

- Company type: Joint-stock company
- Industry: Defense
- Founded: 1945
- Headquarters: Tula, Russia
- Products: Multiple rocket launchers (MRL)
- Revenue: 19,232,312,000 Russian ruble (2014)
- Net income: 3,640,732,000 Russian ruble (2014)
- Total assets: 18,938,508,000 Russian ruble (2014)
- Parent: Techmash
- Website: splav.org

NPO Splav (Russian: Научно-производственное объединение «СПЛАВ») is one of the leading global developers and manufacturers of multiple rocket launcher systems (MLRS), and one of the key companies providing Russian arms for the global market in the segment. It is the only company in Russia which designs and develops multiple launch rocket systems (MLRS) and cartridges.

The company is part of the Techmash holding (Rostec).

== History ==
NPO Splav was established in 1945.

During the Russo-Ukrainian War on December 22, 2015, the United States through EO 13662 explicitly lists NPO Splav on the US Department of Treasury's Office of Foreign Assets Control (OFAC) Sectoral Sanctions Identifications List (SSI) because of its links to Rostec and blocks any United States person or entity or person in the United States from conducting business with NPO Splav and other entities associated with Rostec.

In 2016, Splav joined with Motovilikha Plants.

In early 2024, the company reported that it had increased the production of ammunition by 4 times.

== Products ==
- BM-21 Grad
- BM-27 Uragan
- BM-30 Smerch
- DP-62 Dam
- Udav-1 anti-submarine system
- RPK-8
- Tornado MRL
