= July 2022 Chasiv Yar missile strike =

July 2022 Russian missile attack in Ukraine

Chasiv Yar missile strike
- Part of the Russian invasion of Ukraine
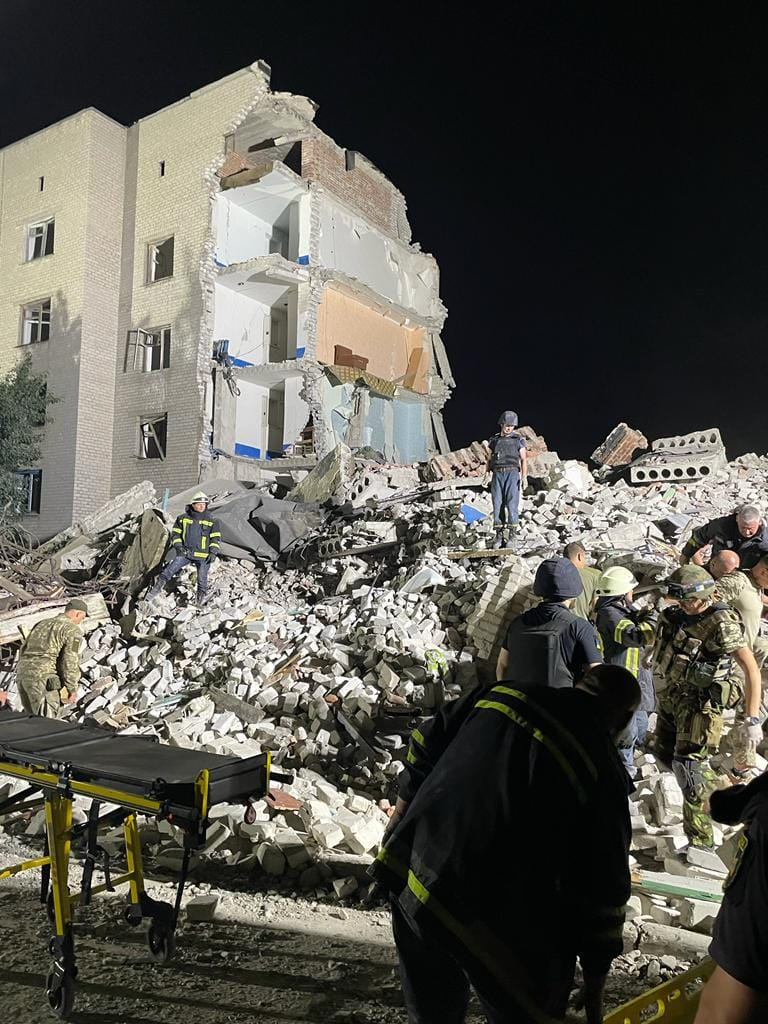
- One of the two partially destroyed buildings that suffered the most damage
- Location: 48.55665°N 37.82323°E; Chasiv Yar, Bakhmut Raion, Donetsk Oblast, Ukraine
- Date: 9 July 2022; ~21:17 (UTC+3)
- Target: Apartment buildings
- Attack type: Missile strike
- Weapon: BM-27 Uragan
- Deaths: 48+
- Injuries: Unknown (9 people were pulled out from under the rubble)
- Perpetrator: Russian Armed Forces

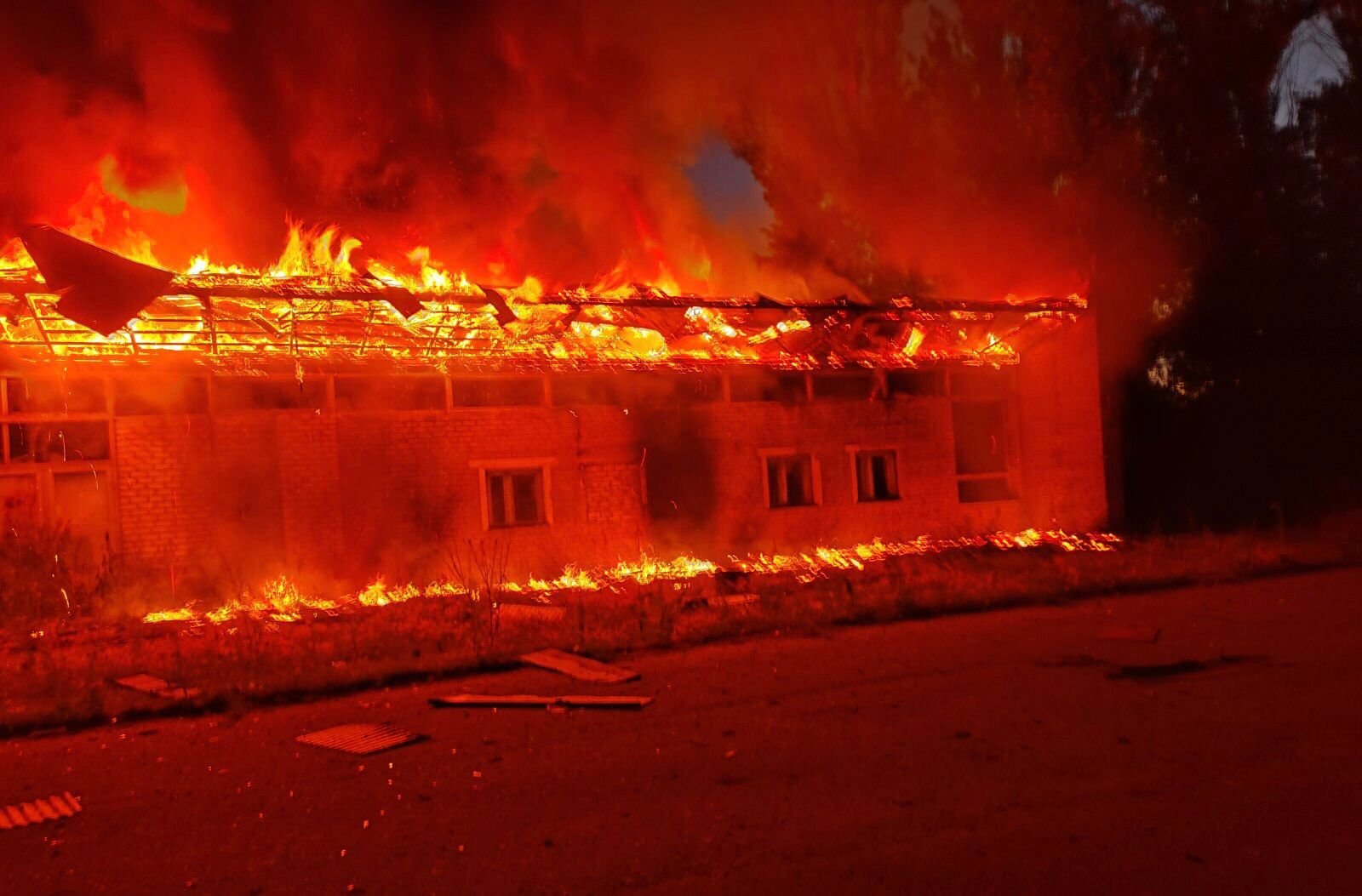
Railway station in Chasiv Yar shelled earlier the same day

A missile strike on two residential buildings in Chasiv Yar was carried out by the Russian army at 21:17 local time on 9 July 2022, during the ongoing Russian invasion of Ukraine. At least 48 people were killed. Due to the impact, a five-story residential building partially collapsed. Two entrances were completely destroyed.

== Course of events ==
Chasiv Yar has a population of about 12,000 people and is located about 20 km (12 mi) southeast of Kramatorsk on the western side of the city of Bakhmut.

The strike was alleged, including by Donetsk Oblast governor Pavlo Kyrylenko, to have been performed with "Uragan", a self-propelled 220 mm multiple rocket launcher designed in the Soviet Union. The Russian Defense Ministry claimed that they destroyed a "temporary deployment point” of a Ukrainian territorial defence unit.

As of 10 July, 67 rescue workers of the State Emergency Service of Ukraine were trying to help the victims and more than 20 people were still feared to be trapped under the rubble.

Rescue and search operations continued until the morning of 14 July 2022. Rescuers dismantled about 525 tons of destroyed elements of the building. 323 employees of the State Emergency Service and 9 units of equipment were involved.

== Victims ==
As of 13 July, 48 dead were found under the rubble of the building, and nine wounded were rescued as of 12 July. A local resident told the New York Times that there were 10 elderly civilians in the buildings, but that members of the military had come to lodge there two days earlier. He had tried to persuade his grandmother to move to a safe place, but she had refused. Two soldiers who probably took turns sleeping in the building after being on duty were among the dead.

Initially, Ukrainian media reported at least eleven of the victims were soldiers originally from Ternopil Oblast. Subsequently, other sources reported at least 37 military victims in the strike, the majority of them from Ternopil Oblast. The final military death toll was put at 40.

== Reactions ==
Andriy Yermak, the chief of staff to Ukraine's president, said that the strike was "another terrorist attack" and that Russia should be designated a "state sponsor of terrorism" as a result. Russian military spokesman Igor Konashenkov stated that Russia had killed "over 300 nationalists" in an attack on Chasiv Yar, but did not specify whether or not they were referring to the July airstrike or an earlier attack.
