= Desna barracks airstrike =

Airstrike on Ukraine

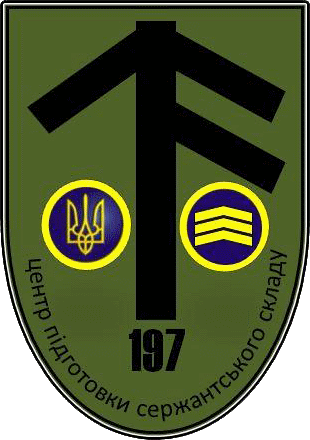
- 197 Sergeant Training Center A4224; Village of Desna, Chernihiv Oblast.
- Type: Airstrike
- Target: Ukrainian Ground Forces
- Date: May 17, 2022
- Executed by: Russian Air Force
- Casualties: 131 missing and killed

On 17 May 2022, an airstrike by the Russian Air Force hit a military barracks in Desna, Chernihiv Oblast, Ukraine.

== Aftermath ==
Ukrainian authorities initially reported that eight people had died and twelve were wounded, but updated the casualty count a week later when Volodymyr Zelenskyy said that 87 bodies had been recovered. Russian officials said that the military had used "high-precision, long-range missiles." It was reportedly the largest single loss of life in the Ukrainian military in the Russian invasion of Ukraine up to that point.

In November 2023, the Ukrainian Memory Book Group reported by name the updated toll of the attack to 63 killed, 68 officially missing and 39 wounded.
