= Missile strike on the award ceremony of the 128th Mountain Assault Brigade =

2023 missile strike

- Part of the Russian invasion of Ukraine
- Type: Missile strike
- Location: Zarichne, Zaporizhzhia Oblast, Ukraine
- Target: 128th Mountain Assault Brigade of the Ukrainian Armed Forces
- Date: November 3, 2023
- Executed by: Russian Armed Forces
- Casualties: 19–28 killed 53 injured

On November 3, 2023, Russian forces launched a missile strike on the award ceremony of the 128th Mountain Assault Brigade in the village of Zarichne, Zaporizhzhia Oblast. According to various reports, between 19 and 28 Ukrainian soldiers were killed and 53 were wounded as a result of the attack.

== Strike ==
On November 3, 2023, the command of the 128th Separate Mountain Assault Brigade gathered a certain number of servicemen for awarding on the occasion of the Day of Missile Forces and Artillery. During the formation, at approximately 10–11 am, an Iskander-M missile, fired by the Russian Armed Forces, struck the awards ceremony site.

According to Hromadske, the strike occurred when the servicemen were waiting for the arrival of the brigade commander Dmytro Lysiuk, who was late for the ceremony. The Russians monitored the site with a drone before launching the strike.

== Casualties ==
On 5 November Ukrainian MP Oleksiy Kucherenko reported that 28 soldiers were killed in the strike and 53 others were wounded.

On November 6, the 128th Separate Mountain Assault Brigade confirmed the strike and stated that 19 servicemen were killed in the strike. After the attack, 21 corpses were counted by soldiers of the 128th Separate Mountain Assault Brigade.

Among those killed as a result of the strike were an employee of the Ministry for Veterans Affairs Serhiy Kuznev, artillery platoon commander Dmytro Miliutin, deputy commander of the 128th brigade Lieutenant Colonel Andriy Tarasenko and ex-head of the Khmelnytskyi Regional Territorial Center for Recruitment and Social Support Volodymyr Voznyi.

The head of the Zakarpattia Regional Military Administration where the 128th brigade is based, Viktor Mykyta, said that since November 6, a three-day mourning period has been declared in the Zakarpattia region for those killed as a result of the attack.

== Reactions ==
On November 4, the strike on the 128th Brigade was confirmed by the Center for Strategic Communications of the Armed Forces of Ukraine. The Minister of Defense of Ukraine Rustem Umerov ordered to conduct an investigation into the circumstances of the frontline zone.

In a video message on the evening of November 5, President of Ukraine Volodymyr Zelenskyy expressed his condolences to the families of the victims and said that criminal proceedings had been opened on the fact of the strike.

On the evening of November 6, President Zelenskyy and the General Staff of the Armed Forces of Ukraine announced that the commander of the 128th Brigade, Dmytro Lysiuk, who led the fighters to line up, had been suspended from his duties.

On November 14, the Main Inspectorate of the Ministry of Defense of Ukraine reported to Minister Umerov on the results of the verification of the circumstances of the missile strike: according to the minister, "now we know minute by minute what happened and how. We figured out what led to the tragedy and how it could have been avoided." It is noted that the rules of camouflage and other security measures were ignored. The Minister of Defense said that the investigation, in particular, is being conducted by the State Bureau of Investigation, and instructed the General Staff of the Armed Forces of Ukraine to "check the implementation of security protocols in the units". In a comment in his post, the minister also noted that the order includes "regulation of the procedure for announcing incentives and presenting awards".

Ukrainian officials said they retaliated for the attack by striking Russian troops of the 810th Guards Naval Infantry Brigade based in Russian-occupied Donetsk oblast on November 21.
