= Makiivka military quarters shelling =

2022–2023 Ukrainian strikes on Russian forces

- Part of the Russo-Ukrainian war (2022–present)
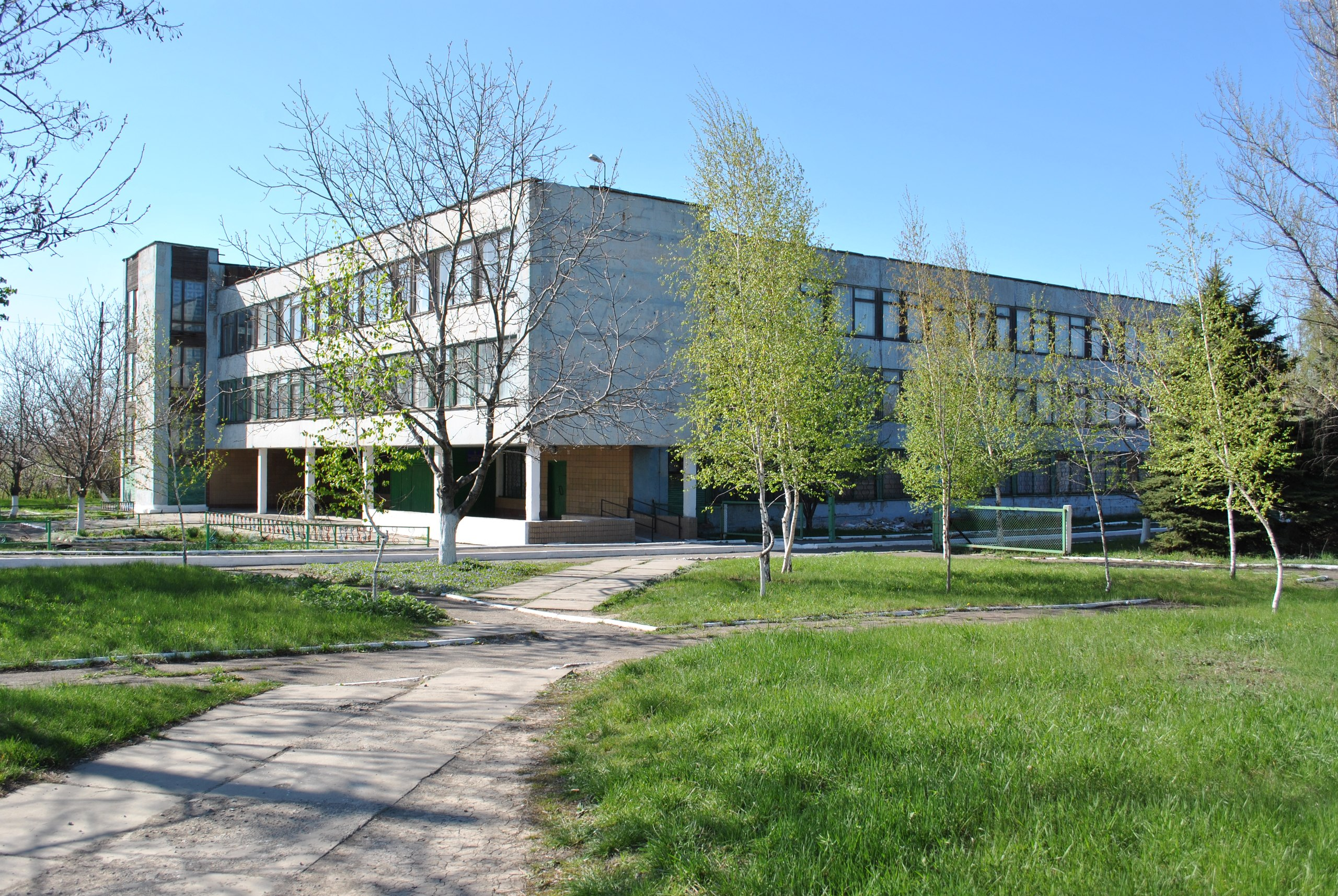
- The Professional Technical School No. 19, the building that was shelled
- Location: Makiivka, Donetsk Oblast, Ukraine (controlled and claimed by the DPR, Russia); 48.05532°N 37.91499°E
- Target: Russian military personnel stationed at Professional Technical School No. 19
- Date: 31 December 2022 – 1 January 2023; 23:57 – 0:01 (UTC+02:00)
- Executed by: Ukrainian Ground Forces
- Casualties: 89 killed (per Russia); 139 killed (confirmed by names, per BBC News Russian); 400 killed, 300 wounded (per Ukraine); 610 killed (Ukrainian intelligence from Russian call)
- Location within Ukraine

During the night of 31 December 2022/1 January 2023, the Ukrainian Ground Forces launched a rocket strike on the building of Professional Technical School (PTU) No. 19 in Makiivka, Donetsk Oblast. Ukrainian officials claimed that the attack killed 400 Russian troops, while Russian officials initially confirmed that 63 troops were killed, but raised the death toll to 89 two days later. The attack was carried out using HIMARS rockets, and resulted in the destruction of the building and nearby military equipment.

== Attack ==
Mobilized men, approximately 600 of them from Saratov Oblast, were crowded together in the building of PTU No. 19 at 48 Kremlivska Street, with ammunition piles in the basement below them. Ukrainian forces made three attacks with M142 HIMARS at 23:57, 23:59 and 00:00 hours. Two out of six rockets were intercepted, according to the Russian military, while the remaining rockets hit the building and detonated the ammunition stored below.

== Casualties ==
Between 400 and 500 deaths and 300 injuries were reported by the Ukrainian army. However, the General Staff of the Ukrainian Armed Forces did not present the numbers in its daily update of Russian losses. Pro-Russian Telegram channels reported the deaths of hundreds of mobilized troops. An unnamed source close to the leadership of the Donetsk People's Republic only confirmed to Reuters "dozens" of dead, calling reports of a death toll above 100 exaggerated. On 2 January, Russia initially acknowledged 63 soldiers had died in the attack, updating the figure two days later to 89 dead. Mobilized soldiers from Samara Oblast, part of the 1444th Motor Rifle Regiment, were among those killed in Makiivka. The regiment's deputy commander, Lieutenant Colonel Bachurin, was reported to be among the dead. On 3 February 2023, BBC News Russian reported they had documented the deaths of 101 soldiers in the attack, while 18 remained missing. By 17 March 2023, they updated the confirmed number of dead to 139.

The General Staff of Ukraine claimed 10 vehicles destroyed.

On 11 January 2023, the Ukrainian Defence Ministry's Chief Intelligence Department released a phone call that it said was intercepted between a Russian "occupier" and her husband. The woman told her husband that another soldier had "personally transported the bodies of these people from Makiivka and from another [settlement]... from the hospital. He says 610 people died in Makiivka. He says, ‘I drove 12 Kamaz trucks [filled with bodies – ed.]’."

== Reactions ==
Russian military correspondents criticized the deployment of so many soldiers in an unsafe building. An official in the Russian-controlled Donetsk administration, Daniil Bezsonov, called for the military officers responsible to be "punished" for placing a large number of troops at this barracks. Igor Girkin wrote on Telegram "many hundreds ... remained under the rubble", and "Our generals are untrainable in principle". Russian-appointed Donetsk officials blamed the soldiers for having accessed their mobile phones. Russian parliamentarian Sergey Mironov has called for the prosecution of responsible officials "whether they wear epaulets or not".

In retaliation, Russian forces destroyed an ice arena in Druzhkivka, allegedly housing Ukrainian military personnel, on 3 January. Russia's Ministry of Defence claimed the attack killed up to 200 Ukrainian soldiers and destroyed four HIMARS launchers. According to Ukrainian authorities, two people were injured in the attack on Druzhkivka.

Russia claimed to have attacked Ukrainian barracks in Kramatorsk as revenge for the Ukrainian attack on Russian barracks at Makiivka. A Finnish and more than one Reuters journalist visited the site and reported that there was no evidence of damage to any dormitories nor any casualties, or even evidence that Ukrainian soldiers were present in the building.

== See also ==
- Timeline of the Russo-Ukrainian war (29 August – 11 November 2022)
