= Falaq-2 =

Iranian multiple launch rocket system

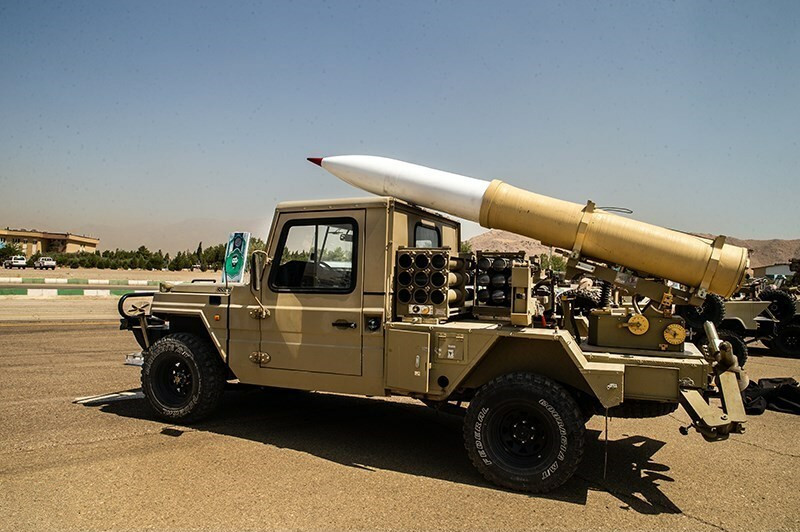
Falaq-2 rockets mounted on a truck. The Falaq-2 rocket has been partially inserted into the launch tube.

The Falaq-2 missile is the second generation of Falaq unguided artillery rocket systems. This system was also developed in the 1990s by the Shahid Bagheri Industries, which is part of the Aerospace Industries Organization.

It is considered possible that the 333 mm unguided surface-to-surface artillery rocket used in the Falaq-2 artillery rocket system is related to the longer-range Shahin-1 and Shahin-2 systems. The same chassis is used as the launch platform for the Iranian Falaq-2, which has a single tube-type launcher mounted on the rear. This launches a single 333 mm unguided surface-to-surface rocket to a maximum range of 10,800 m.

The Falaq-2 is a 333 mm-diameter rocket. It weighs 255 kg and with 120 kg warhead that holds 60 kg of explosives.

There is extensive evidence Falaq-2 rockets have been used in the Syrian civil war.

== Operators ==
- Hezbollah
- Iran
- Syria

== See also ==
- Falaq-1 – (Iran)
