= BM-24 =

Russian multiple rocket launcher

BM-24M
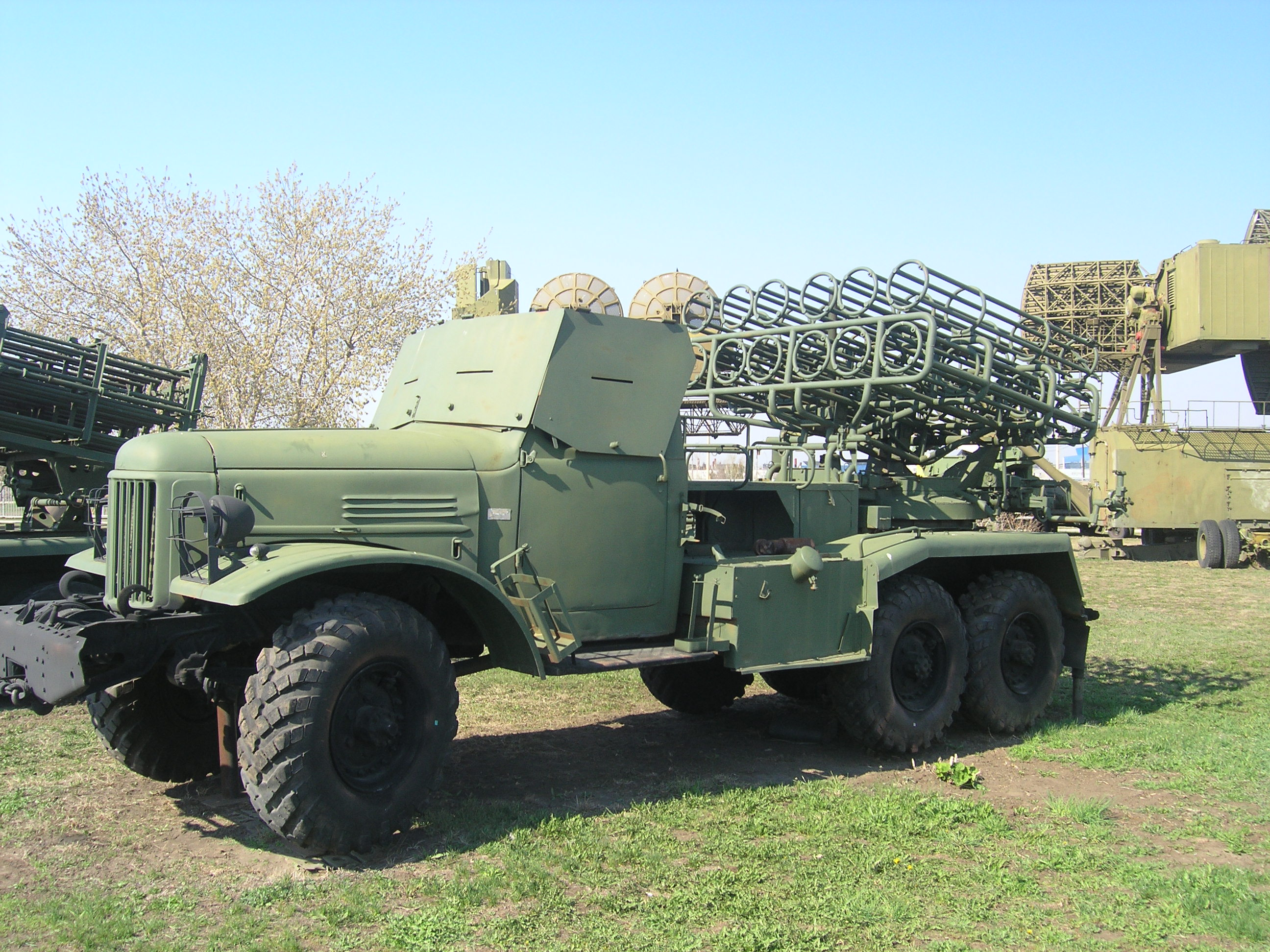
- BM-24M on a ZIL-157 chassis. Technical Museum of Togliatti
- Type: Multiple rocket launcher
- Place of origin: USSR

Service history
- Wars: Six-Day War; Yom Kippur War; 1982 Lebanon War

Production history
- Produced: 1947–58

Specifications
- Mass: 8,680 kg (19,140 lb)
- Length: 6.7 m (22 ft 0 in)
- Width: 2.3 m (7 ft 7 in)
- Height: 2.9 m (9 ft 6 in)
- Crew: 6
- Caliber: Diameter: 240 mm (9.4 in): Long rocket: 1.3 m (4 ft 3 in); Weight: 109 kg (240 lb); Short rocket: 1.2 m (3 ft 11 in); Weight: 112 kg (247 lb)
- Barrels: 12 in two rows
- Elevation: +65°/0°
- Traverse: 140°
- Muzzle velocity: 465 m/s (1,530 ft/s)
- Maximum firing range: Long rocket: 10.2 km (6.3 mi); Short rocket: 6.6 km (4.1 mi)
- Engine: ZIL-157 109HP; 6-cylinder petrol
- Suspension: Wheeled ZIL-157; 6×6 chassis
- Operational range: 430 km (270 mi)
- Maximum speed: 65 km/h (40 mph)

BM-24T
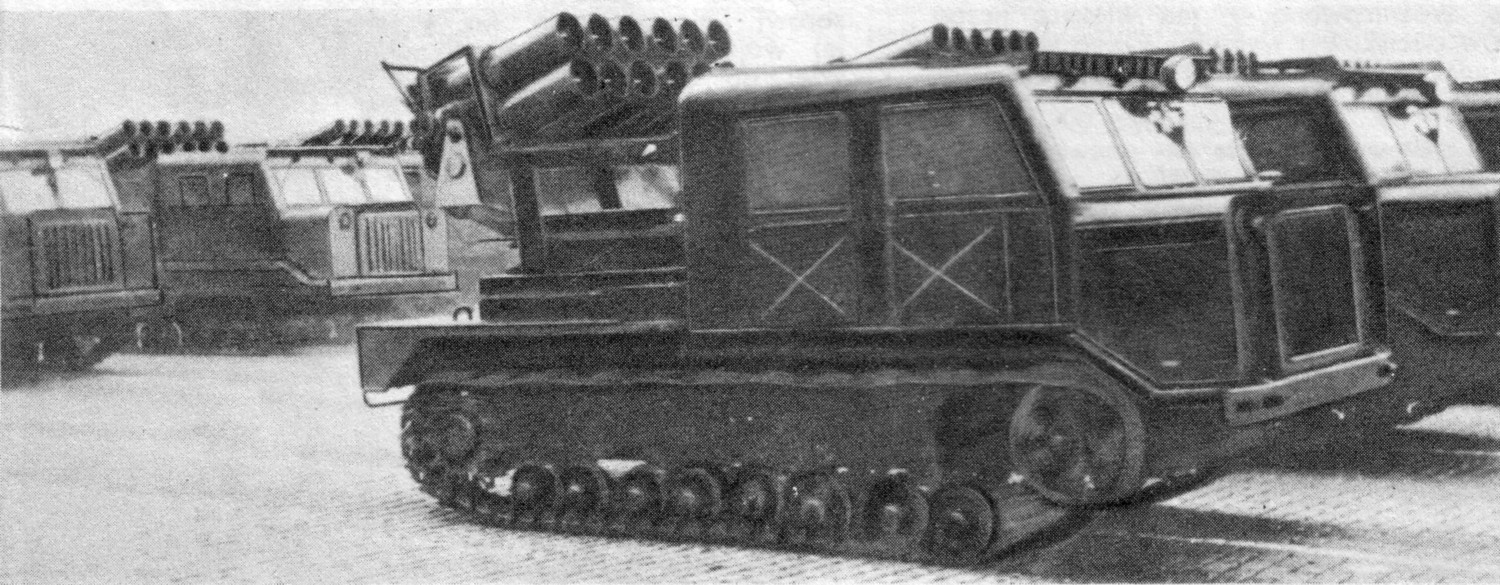
- BM-24T on a AT-S tractor chassis.
- Type: Multiple rocket launcher
- Place of origin: USSR

Specifications
- Mass: 15,240 kg (33,600 lb)
- Length: 5.8 m (19 ft 0 in)
- Width: 2.5 m (8 ft 2 in)
- Height: 3.1 m (10 ft 2 in)
- Crew: 6
- Caliber: Diameter: 240 mm (9.4 in): Long rocket: 1.3 m (4 ft 3 in); Weight: 109 kg (240 lb); Short rocket: 1.2 m (3 ft 11 in); Weight: 112 kg (247 lb)
- Barrels: 12 in two rows
- Elevation: +45°/0°
- Traverse: 210°
- Muzzle velocity: 465 m/s (1,530 ft/s)
- Maximum firing range: Long rocket: 10.2 km (6.3 mi); Short rocket: 6.6 km (4.1 mi)
- Engine: V-54-T 250HP; 12-cylinder diesel
- Suspension: Tracked
- Operational range: 380 km (240 mi)
- Maximum speed: 35 km/h (22 mph)

The BM-24 is a multiple rocket launcher designed in the Soviet Union. It is capable of launching 240mm rockets from 12 launch tubes. Versions of the BM-24 have been mounted on the ZIS-151 and ZIL-157 6×6 Truck chassis and the AT-S tracked artillery tractor, forming the BM-24T from the latter. Production began out of Automotive Factory no. 2 in 1947 in Moscow. Israel operated one battalion, consisting of vehicles captured from Egypt in the Six-Day War. The battalion took part in the Yom Kippur War and the 1982 Lebanon War.

== Variants ==
- BM-24 (8U31) – Basic model, mounted on a ZIS-151 chassis.
- BM-24M (2B3) – Modified model, mounted on a ZIL-157 chassis.
- BM-24T – Tracked model, mounted on an AT-S chassis.
- Israeli upgraded variant.

== Operators ==
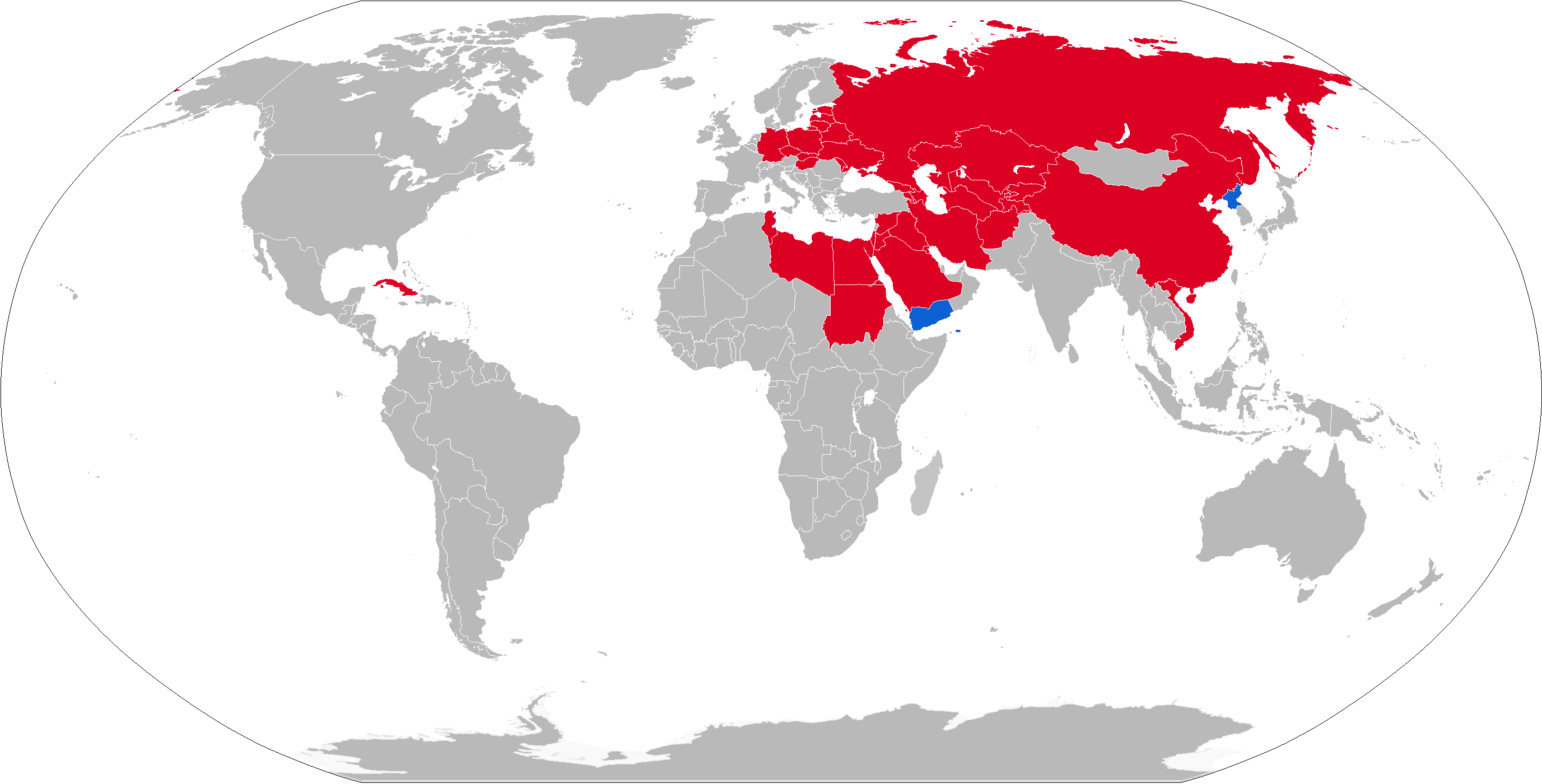
Operators Current Former

=== Current operators ===
- Algeria: 30 BM-24 as of 2016
- Angola
- North Korea: KN-16 and BM-24
- Yemen

=== Former operators ===
- China
- Cuba
- Czechoslovakia
- East Germany
- Egypt: 48 in store as of 2016
- Hungary
- Iran
- Iraq
- Israel: 36 in store as of 2016
- Kuwait
- Jordan
- Libya
- Poland
- Soviet Union
- Sudan
- Syria
- Tunisia
- Vietnam

== See also ==
- Katyusha rocket launcher

== Photo gallery ==
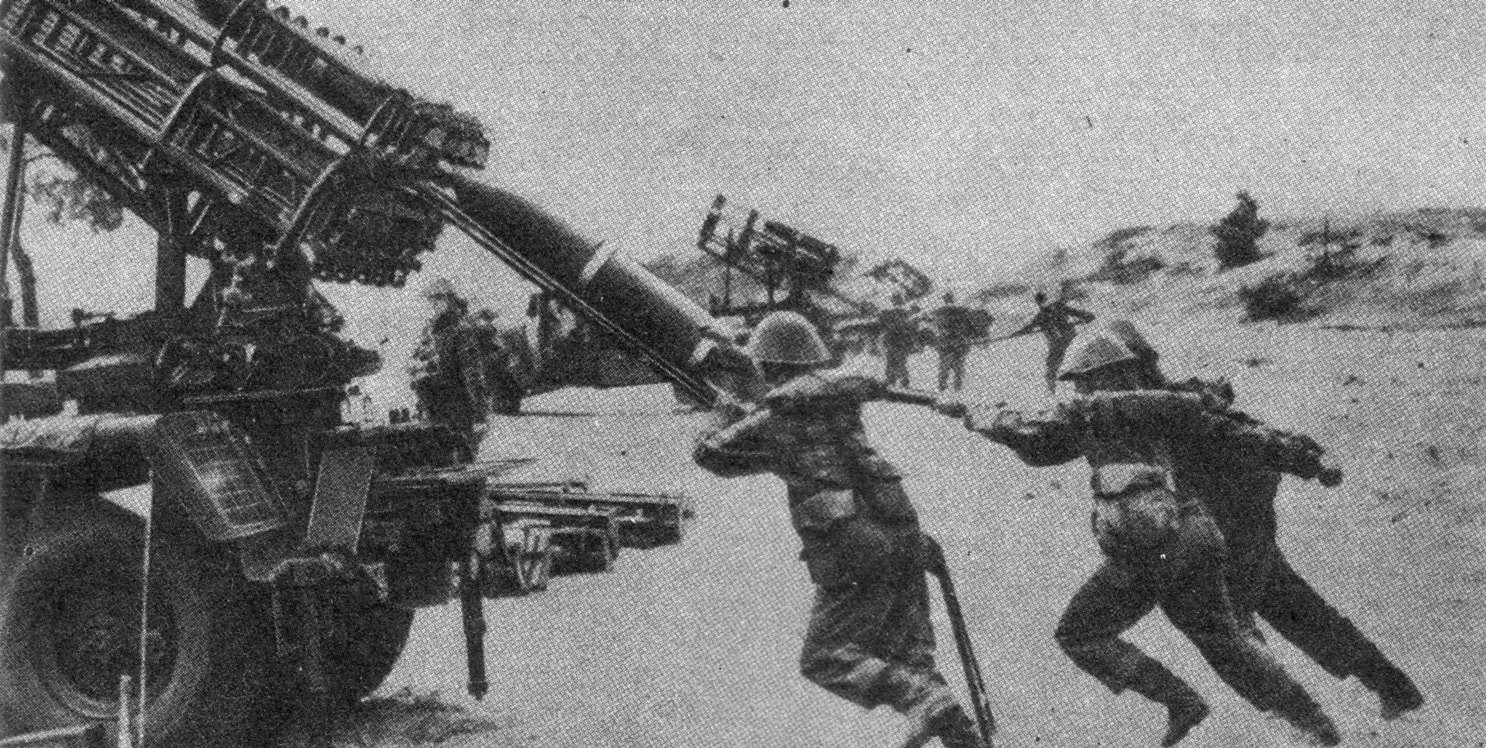
Reload drill

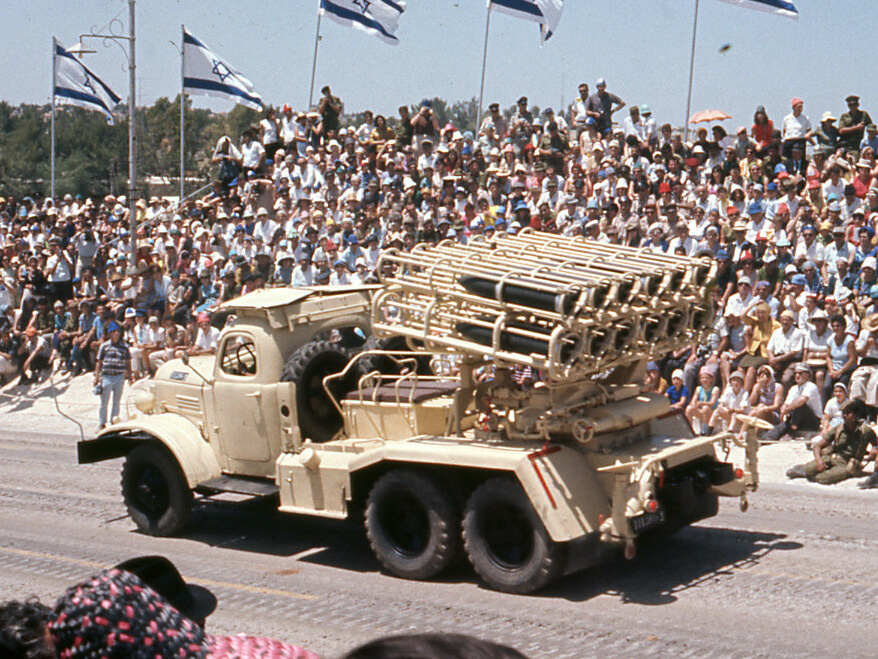
Captured Egyptian BM-24 at parade in Jerusalem, 1968

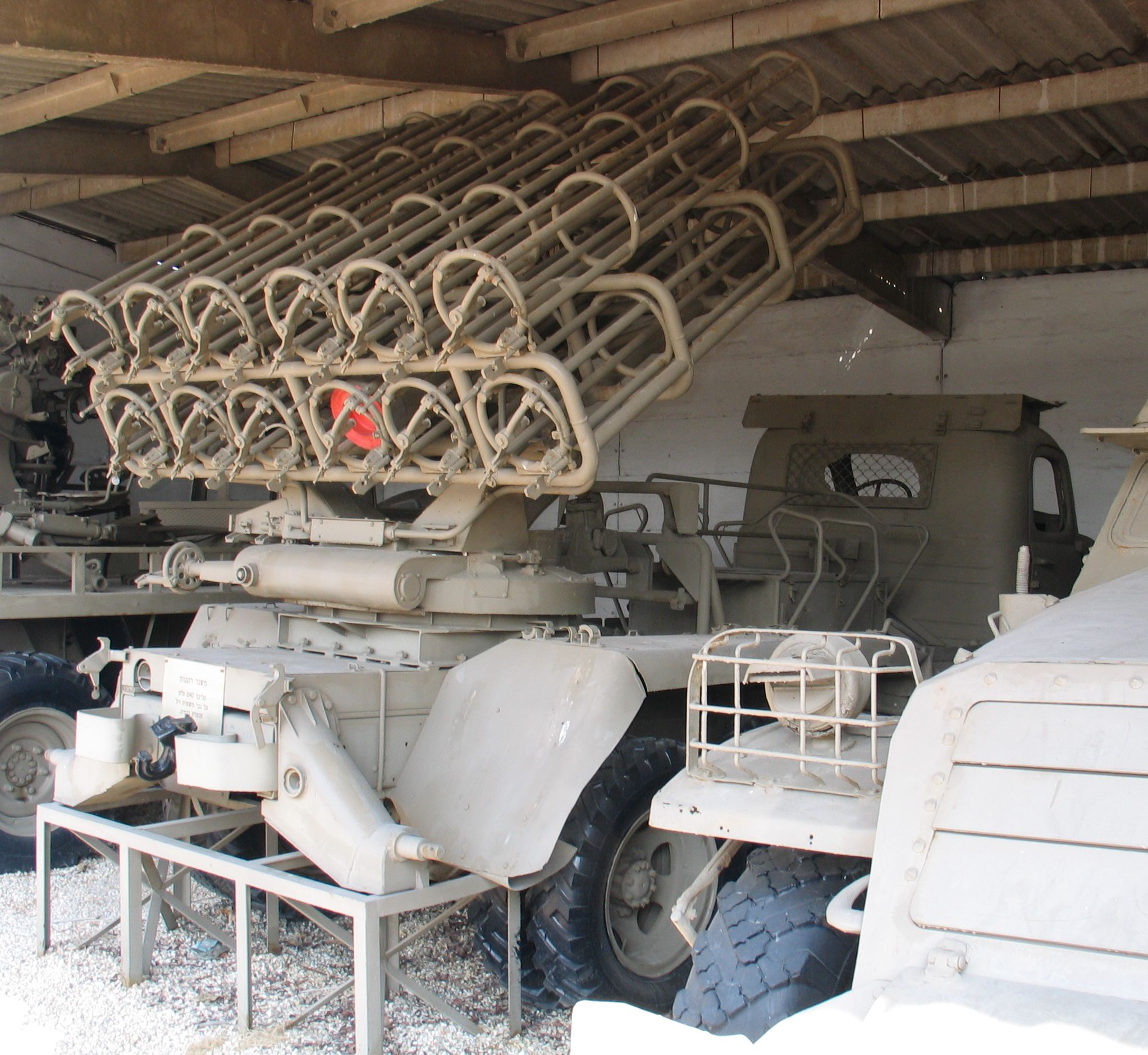
BM-24 at Batey Haosef Museum

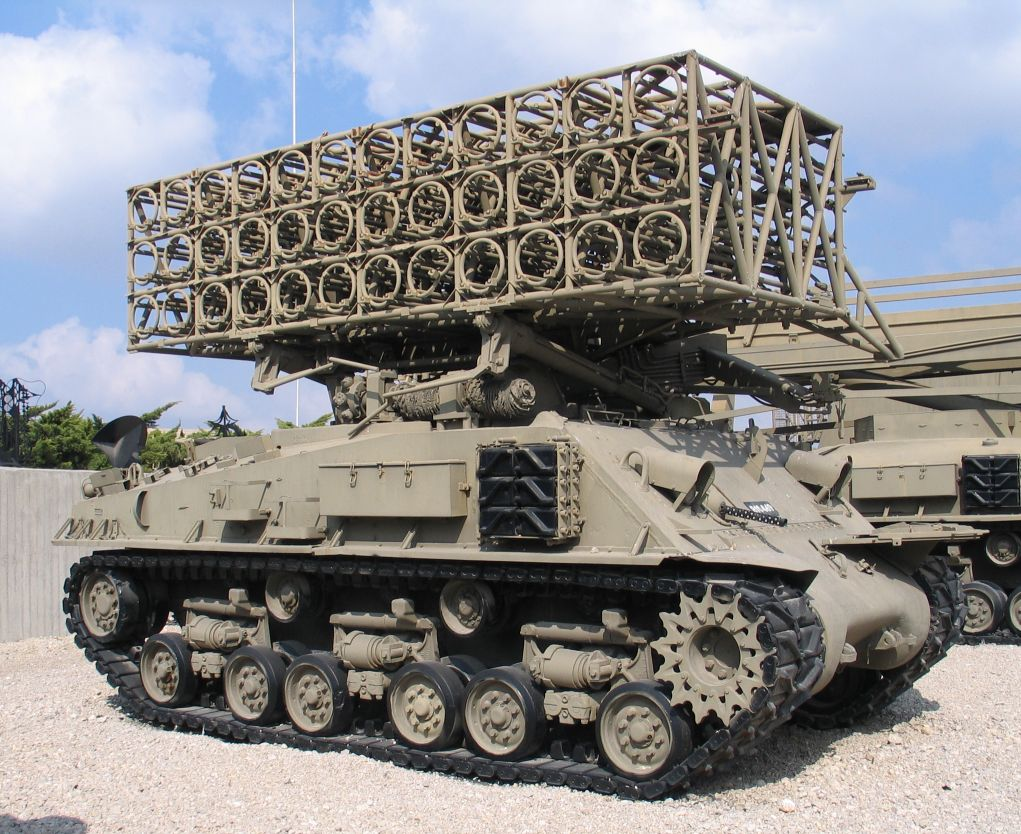
The Israeli 36 rocket MAR-240 on a Sherman tank chassis at Yad la-Shiryon Museum
