= Fajr-5 =

Iranian long-range multiple launch rocket system

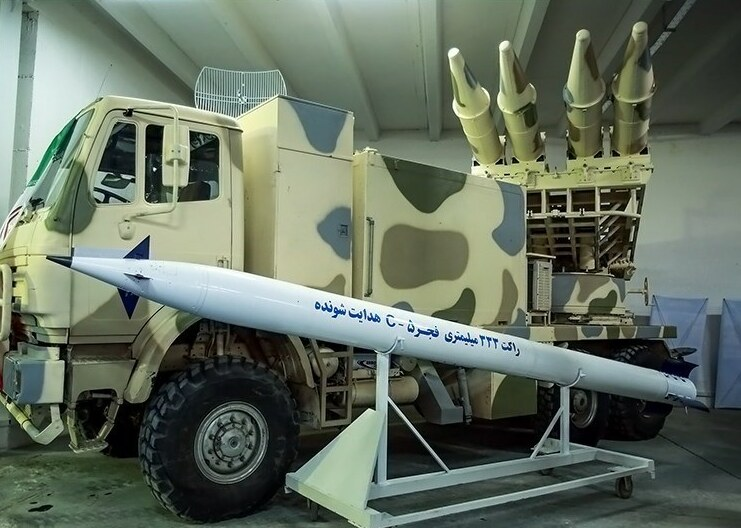
- Type: Rocket artillery
- Place of origin: Iran

Service history
- Used by: See Operators
- Wars: Gaza–Israel conflict Syrian Civil War

Production history
- No. built: Roughly 100 systems

Specifications
- Mass: 15,000 kg (launcher, empty); 90 kg (HE content); 175 kg (warhead); 915 kg (rocket)
- Length: 10.00 m (launcher) (Note: The older Fajr-5 launcher, on a Mercedes 2624 chassis, has slightly larger dimensions; see the brochure); 6.485 m (rocket)
- Width: 2.5 m (launcher)
- Height: 3.34 m (launcher)
- Caliber: 333 mm
- Elevation: 0 to 57 degrees
- Traverse: 45 degrees left and right
- Rate of fire: 4–8 seconds
- Effective firing range: 40–130 km
- Maximum speed: 1,100 m/s (max)

The Fajr-5 (rarely Fadjr-5, Persian: فجر-۵, "Dawn") is an Iranian 333 mm long-range multiple launch rocket system (MLRS). The Fajr-5 was developed during the 1990s and has since been exported to various armed actors in the Middle East.

The Fajr-5 launcher fires four 6.48 meter long, 333 millimeter-calibre Fajr-5 artillery rockets, with a range of 75 kilometers (50 mi), weighing 915 kilograms each and carrying 175-kg fragmentation warheads with 90 kg of high explosive (HE). Most Fajr-5 rockets are unguided; in 2017 Iran introduced a variant, the Fajr-5C, which adds GPS guidance.

The Fajr-5 is primarily used by the Iranian Army Ground Force to attack large, fixed, high-value targets, like airfields and military bases. In addition, the system is also used by militant groups to target Israel. Finally, the system has a niche role in use by the IRGC-N as an unguided anti-ship rocket system for the Persian Gulf.

== Design ==
=== MLRS ===
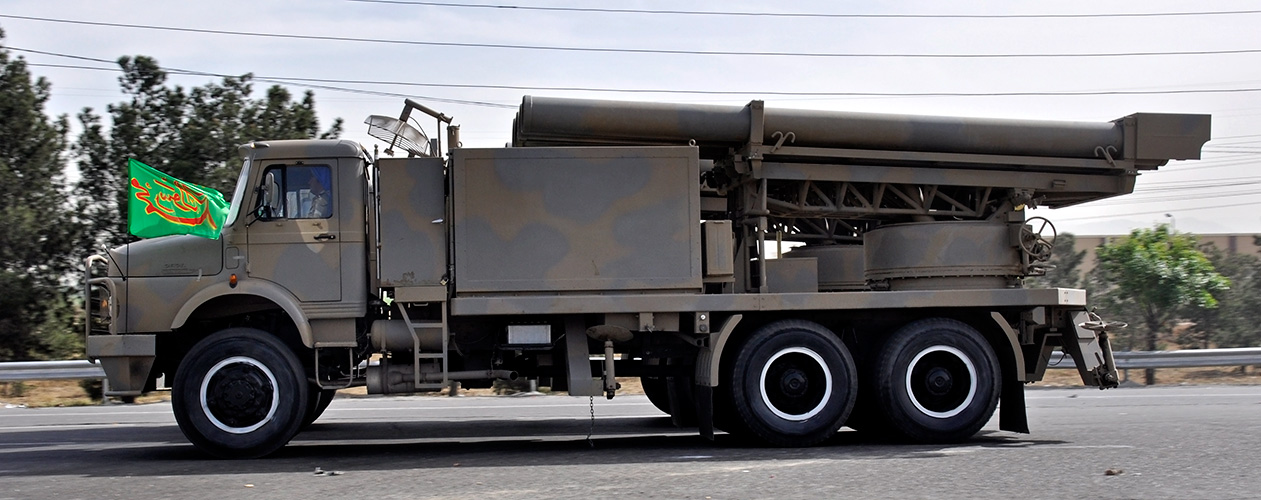
An older Fajr-5 launcher in 2013.

The Fajr-5 artillery rocket system is installed on a Mercedes Benz 2631 6×6 forward control chassis. To provide a stable firing platform, four hydraulically operated stabilizers are lowered to the ground before firing. Another fully enclosed cabin to the immediate rear of the cab houses the remainder of the crew. This new chassis was unveiled in 2006; some systems have not been upgraded and are still on older chassis.

The Fajr-5 is normally fired from this truck launcher, but it can also be fired individually. The primary role of this artillery rocket system is the engagement of land targets. A naval surface search radar can be added to allow the system to be used in an anti-shipping role.

Fajr-5 MLRS can be networked together, and have a remote-fire capability in which the command vehicle can fire all nearby Fajr-5 systems.

The Fajr-5's circular error probable (CEP) is not known. The Fajr-5's reliability, cost or production status is not known.

In 2019, the Defense Intelligence Agency described the Fajr-5 as the "most capable" multiple rocket launcher in Iranian service.

=== Rocket ===
==== Basic rocket ====
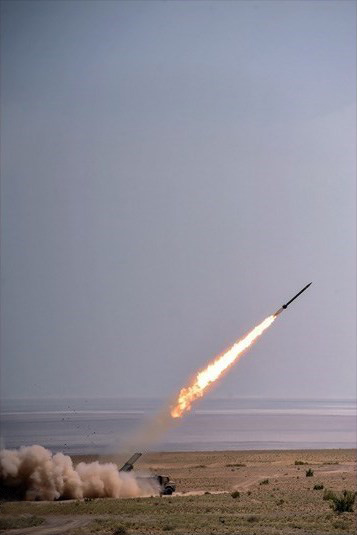
A basic Fajr-5 rocket firing during a 2014 military exercise in Iran.

The rocket is solid fueled and has a fragmentation high explosive warhead. The rocket is 6.485 meters long, 333mm in diameter, and weighs 907 kg. It has wraparound fins for stabilization in flight, which reach a diameter of 710 mm when extended. The rocket's double base propulsion burns for an average time of 5.3 seconds, reaching a peak velocity of 1100 m/s. The rocket's motor has nine launch nozzles arranged in a circle, which are slanted to help create spin-stabilization in flight. The Fajr-5 rocket carries a 175 kg warhead with a fragmentation radius of 500m.

One source reports that Fajr-5 rockets can likely carry (plain) high explosive, submunitions, incendiary, smoke, or chemical payloads as well. The shelf life of a basic Fajr-5 rocket is 15 years.

==== Two-stage rocket ====
Iran produces a two-stage Fajr-5 rocket with extended range. The two-stage Fajr-5 rocket has a length of 9.4 m and a maximum range of 180 km at sea level. This variant has a diameter of 333 mm, like other Fajr-5 rockets, but has fixed fins, which have a diameter of 561 mm. The two-stage Fajr-5 can reach a maximum altitude of 85 km and carries the same 175 kg warhead with a 500m fragmentation radius. This variant is launched from TELs similar to those used for Zelzal rockets, which only have the capacity for a single rocket.

The shelf life of a two stage Fajr-5 rocket is 15 years.

==== Fajr-5C ====
It has a firing accuracy of 250 m when using INS and 50 m using GNSS, with range from 40–130 km (25–81 mi).

The guided Fajr-5 rocket was briefly mentioned, and believed to be under development, in 2014. The missile has been delivered to the IRGC Ground Force units as of May 2023.

== GR110/GF5LR1 ==
In August 2023, Iran revealed a new version of the Fajr-5 at the Ministry of Defense Industry Authority Exhibition 1402.

It has a maximum range of 110 km and a weight of 902 kg with a warhead weighing 115 kg while achieving an accuracy of 25m CEP.

=== Reloading ===
When the Fajr-5 is reloaded, the launch tubes (in two groups of two) are detached from the launcher and laid on the ground by a crane (an Italian Effer 155-25). Then, a machine called a "Loading machine" is used to mechanically press the heavy Fajr-5 rockets into their launch tubes one by one. When all the tubes are filled, the crane is used to reattach the launch tubes to the vehicle. Because of the long reload time and large size of the "Loading machine" (12m), the Fajr-5 MLRS is supposed to retreat after firing to safer rear battle areas to reload. A reload takes 2 minutes per rocket.

== History ==
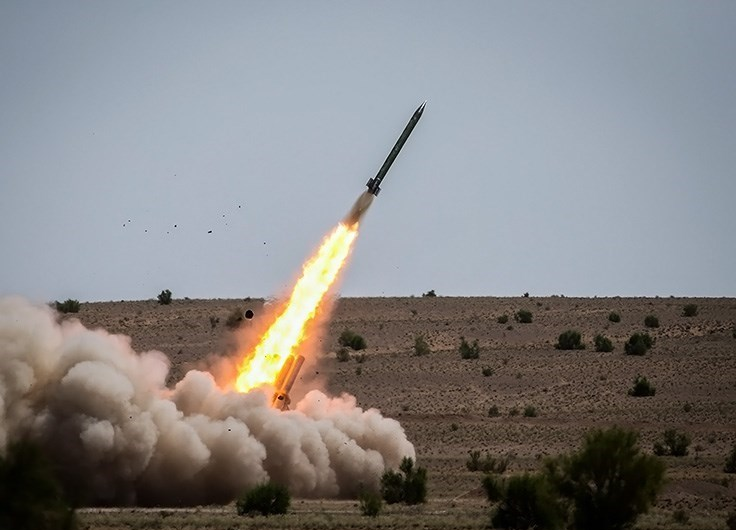
A Fajr-5 firing during a military exercise in Iran.

The first Fajr-5 were created when China exported WS-1 MLRS to Iran in the late 1980s/early 1990s. They were then subsequently created and produced by Iran's Aerospace Industries Organization.

== Operational history ==
=== Iran ===
As of 2011, the best estimate for the number of Fajr-5 pieces manufactured was "somewhere around 100" or less.

=== Lebanon ===
Iran supplied a number of Fajr-5s to Hezbollah in Lebanon beginning in 2002 or 2001. Sources disagree on whether Hezbollah used Fajr-5 rockets in the 2006 Lebanon War, in part because at the time they were confused with similar Khaibar-1 rockets.

=== Palestinian territories ===
Fajr-5 rockets are held in the Gaza Strip by Palestinian militant groups. The first was fired by Hamas in November 2012. It is believed that manufacture of some sub-components and final assembly may take place in Gaza, but that the critical components of the rocket are furnished by Iran. Iran denied transferring any rockets to Gaza but said they instead transferred technology to manufacture the rocket.

==== Pillar of Defense ====
In November 2012 during Operation Pillar of Defense, Hamas and Palestinian Islamic Jihad fired Fajr-5 rockets towards Tel Aviv and Jerusalem. At least 14 rockets were fired in total.

=== Syria ===
The rear of a Fajr-5.

On May 10, 2018, the IRGC's Quds Force fired 20 rockets into the Israeli-occupied Golan Heights from Syrian territory. Some of these were Fajr-5s.

In December 2018 some Fajr-5 rockets were destroyed in an IAF airstrike.

=== Iraq ===
Sporadically, during the US occupation of Iraq (between 2003 and 2011), Iranian Backed militias fired the 333 Fajr-5 at US forces from fabricated rails. In 2015, Iran sent Fajr-5 rockets and launcher systems to Iraq to be used in the War against the Islamic State. It is unknown if they were fired, and the quantity sent is also unknown.

=== Yemen ===
The Houthis have unveiled a rocket with similarities to the Fajr-5.

== Operators ==
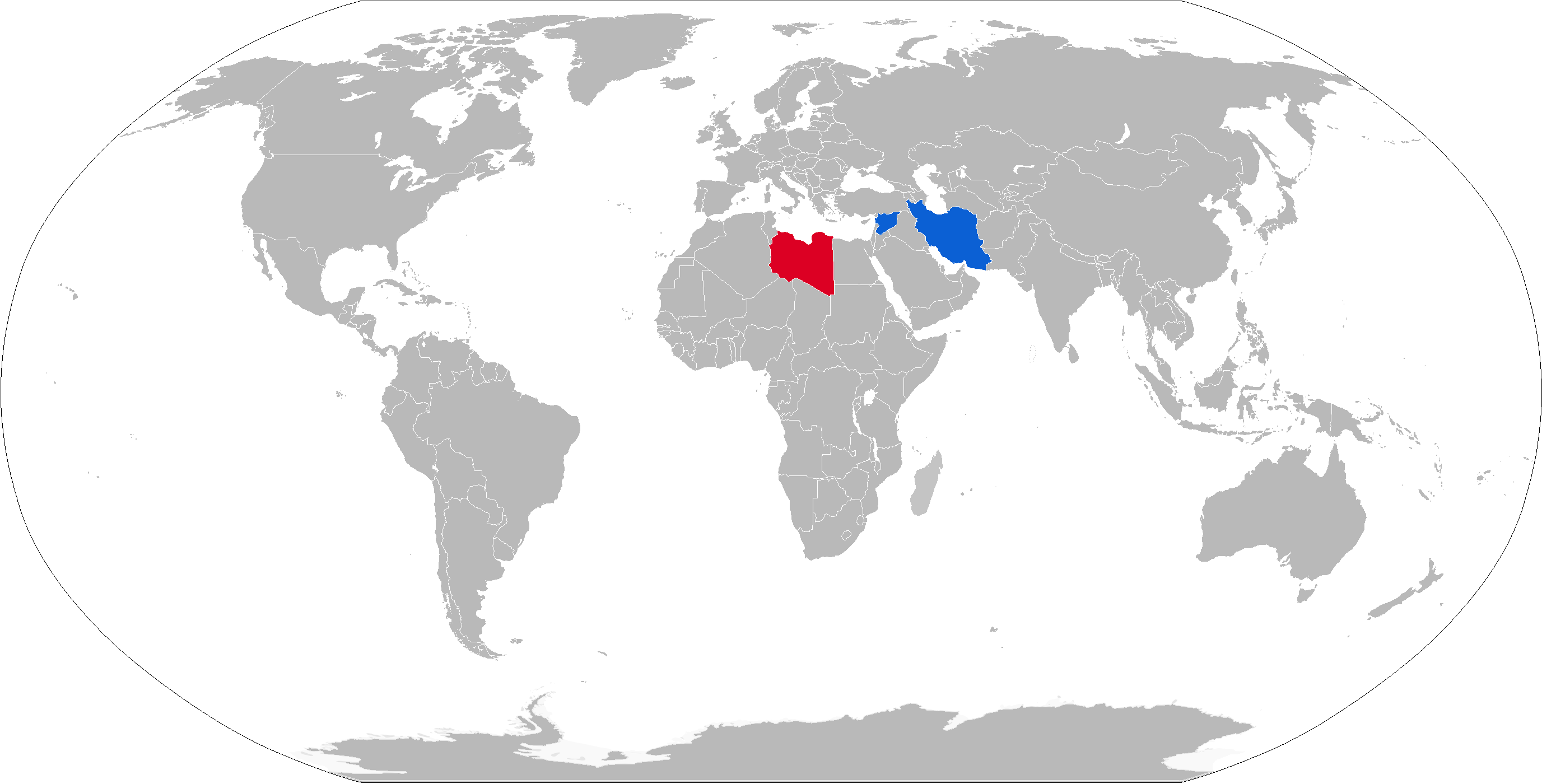
Map with Fajr-5 operators in blue with former operators in red

=== Current ===
- Iran
  - Iranian Army
    - Iranian Army Ground Force
      - 840th Missile Group
  - IRGC
    - IRGC-N
- Syria
  - Syrian Armed Forces
    - Syrian Arab Army

=== Non-state operators ===
- Hamas (Izz al-Din al-Qassam Brigades)
- Hezbollah
- Islamic Jihad Movement in Palestine (Al-Quds Brigades)

=== Former ===
- Libya
