= Kyiv strikes (2022–present) =

Russian missile strikes in Kyiv, Ukraine

Diagram of air raid sirens in Kyiv in 2023

Kyiv, the capital of Ukraine with around 2,950,000 residents, has been frequently targeted by the Russian Armed Forces during the Russo-Ukrainian war.

== Overview ==
An attempt to capture the city was made in February–April 2022, but the Russian forces were repelled. Since then attacks have been carried remotely through airstrikes. Since October 2022 Kyiv has been occasionally attacked by Iranian-made drones on Russian service. From the start of the invasion on 24 February 2022 until 28 May 2023, the air raid siren has been on in Kyiv for a total 887 hours (or around 36 days). Kyiv has 1,078 bomb shelters, but in June 2023 a government commission found that only half of them are usable.

Kyiv endured 1,300 drone and over 250 missiles attacks in 200 airstrikes by Russian forces in 2024. There were 500 air raid alerts throughout said year, resulting in 550 damages to residential buildings, with daily power outage averaging nine hours. By October 2026, 534 people were killed in Kyiv from strikes.

Strikes continued into 2025, with the July 3/4 overnight airstrike launching a record number of drones and missiles targeting Kyiv metropolitan area (KMA), breaking the daily record of Russian long-range drones launched across Ukraine since beginning of the invasion. Further escalations occurred on July 8/9, with 728 drones and 11 missiles targeting KMA and ten out of Ukraine's 23 oblasts.

In January 2026, Kyiv Mayor Vitali Klitschko said that 600,000 residents left the capital after the Russian strikes on 9 January left half of all residential buildings without heating. Due to strikes in early February, Kyiv residents had electricity for less than two hours a day. After the 2026 Starobilsk strike, Russia called foreign diplomats and civilians to evacuate Kyiv, as it threatened with retaliatory airstrikes against the city. The three deadliest strikes were the 29 December 2023 attack which left 33 dead; the 31 July 2025 attack; and the 2 July 2026 attack, both leaving 31 people killed. The Myla airstrike, a village west of Kyiv, left 38 dead.

After US President Donald Trump reduced the resupply of Ukraine with Patriot missile interceptors in 2026, Russia increased its attacks with ballistic missiles against Ukraine by 83% in July 2026 compared to July 2025.

On 10 October 2022, Amnesty International wrote that the "ultimate goal" of attacks against Kyiv is to "spread terror among the entire civilian population". Human Rights Watch confirmed that Russian armed forces used cluster munition in a ballistic missile attack on Nova Poshta sorting center in Kyiv on 5 August 2026. It thus found Russian forces guilty of war crime of indiscriminate attack on civilians.

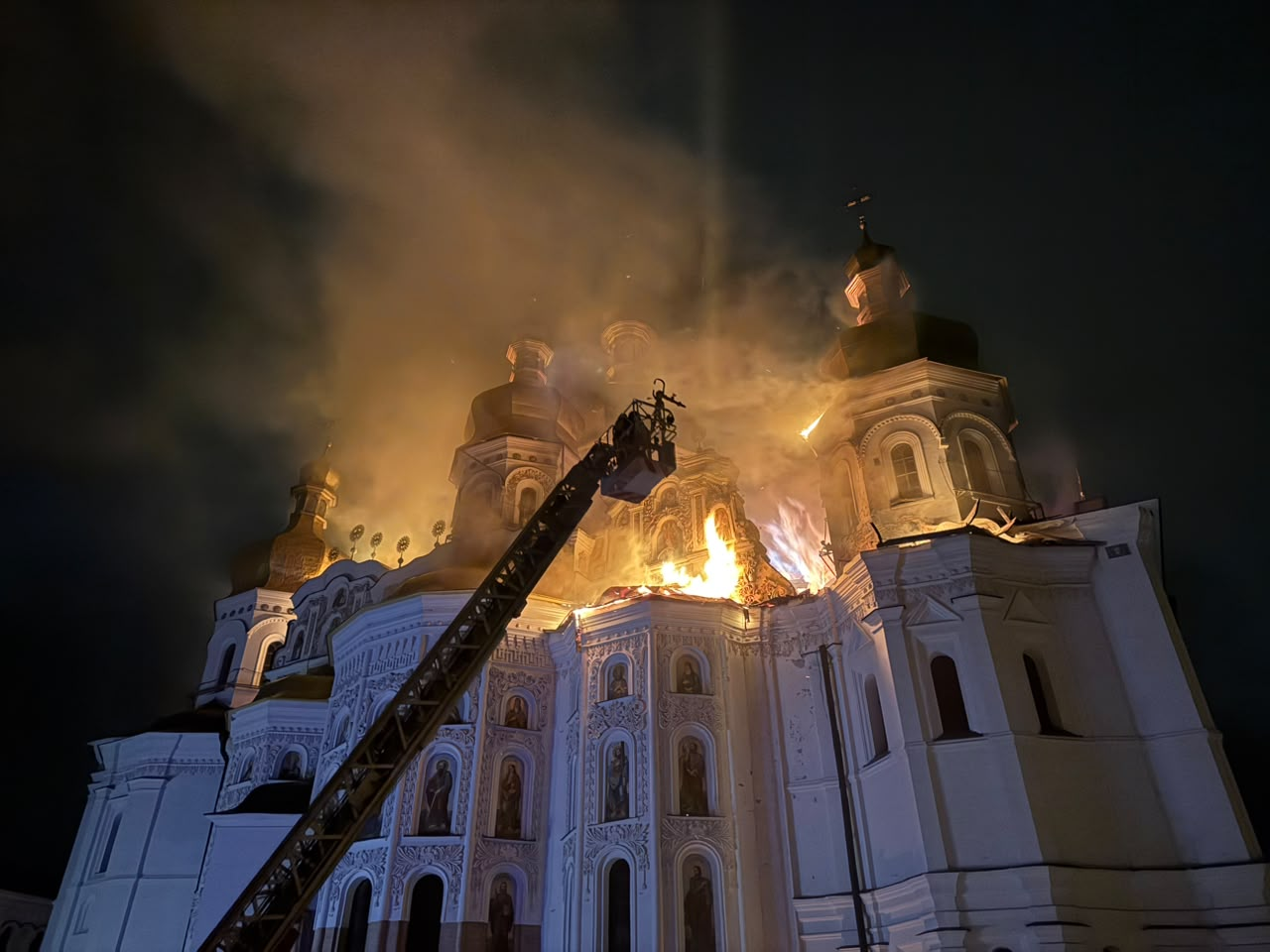
Firefighters extinguishing the fire on Kyiv Pechersk Lavra after Russian airstrike on 15 June 2026

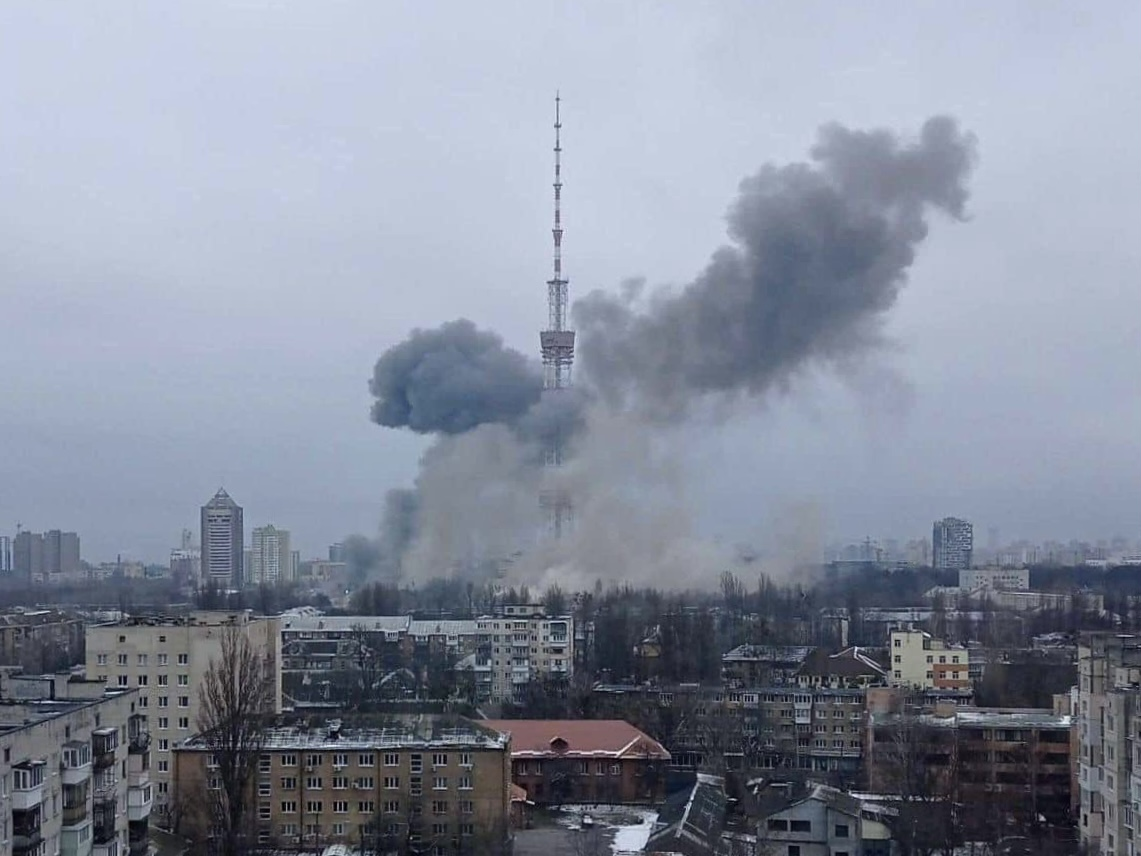
Russian bomardment of Kyiv telecommunications antennas in March 2022

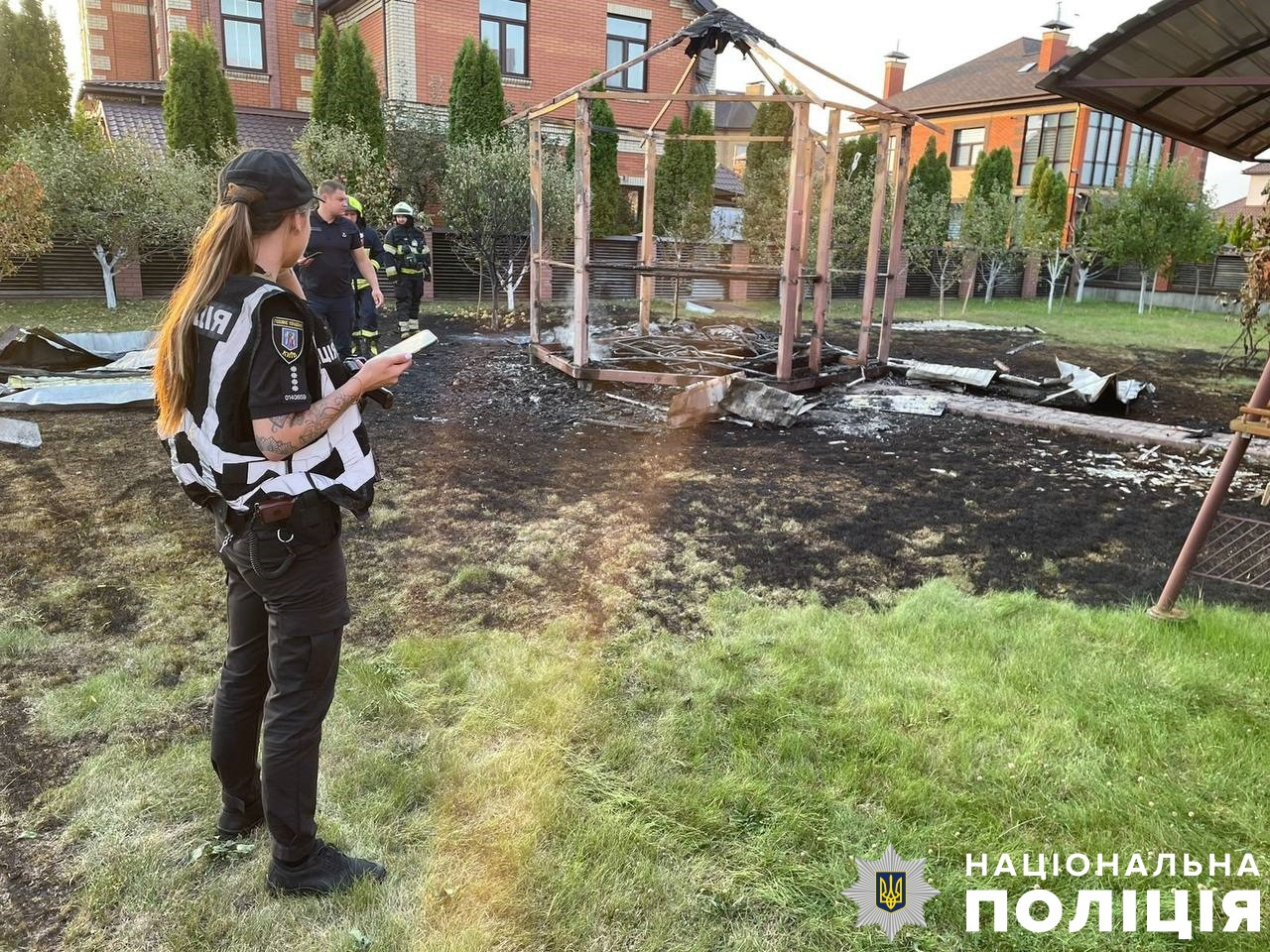
Police inspecting a damage in a garden after a Russian drone attack in the night on 29 August 2024

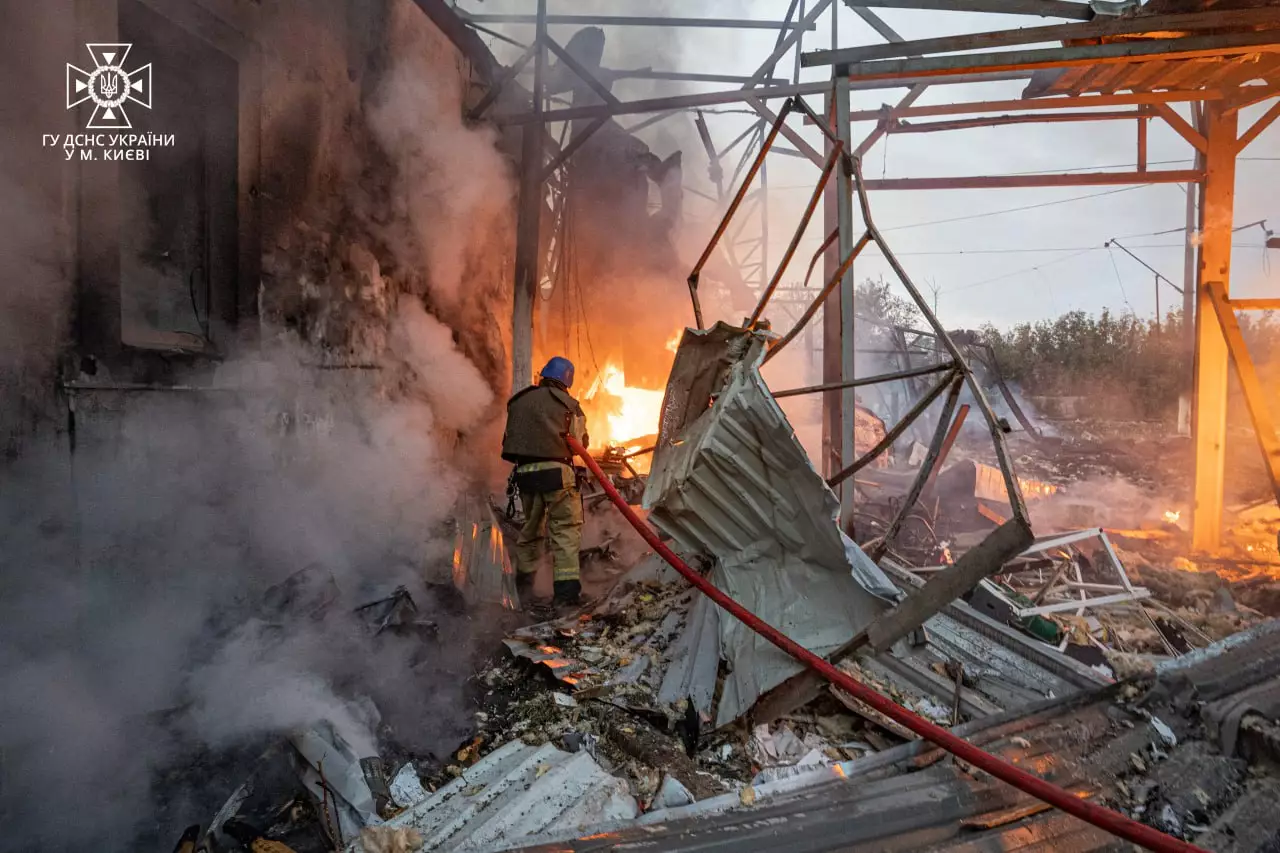
Firefighters extinguishing fire after a Russian missile strike on 21 September 2023

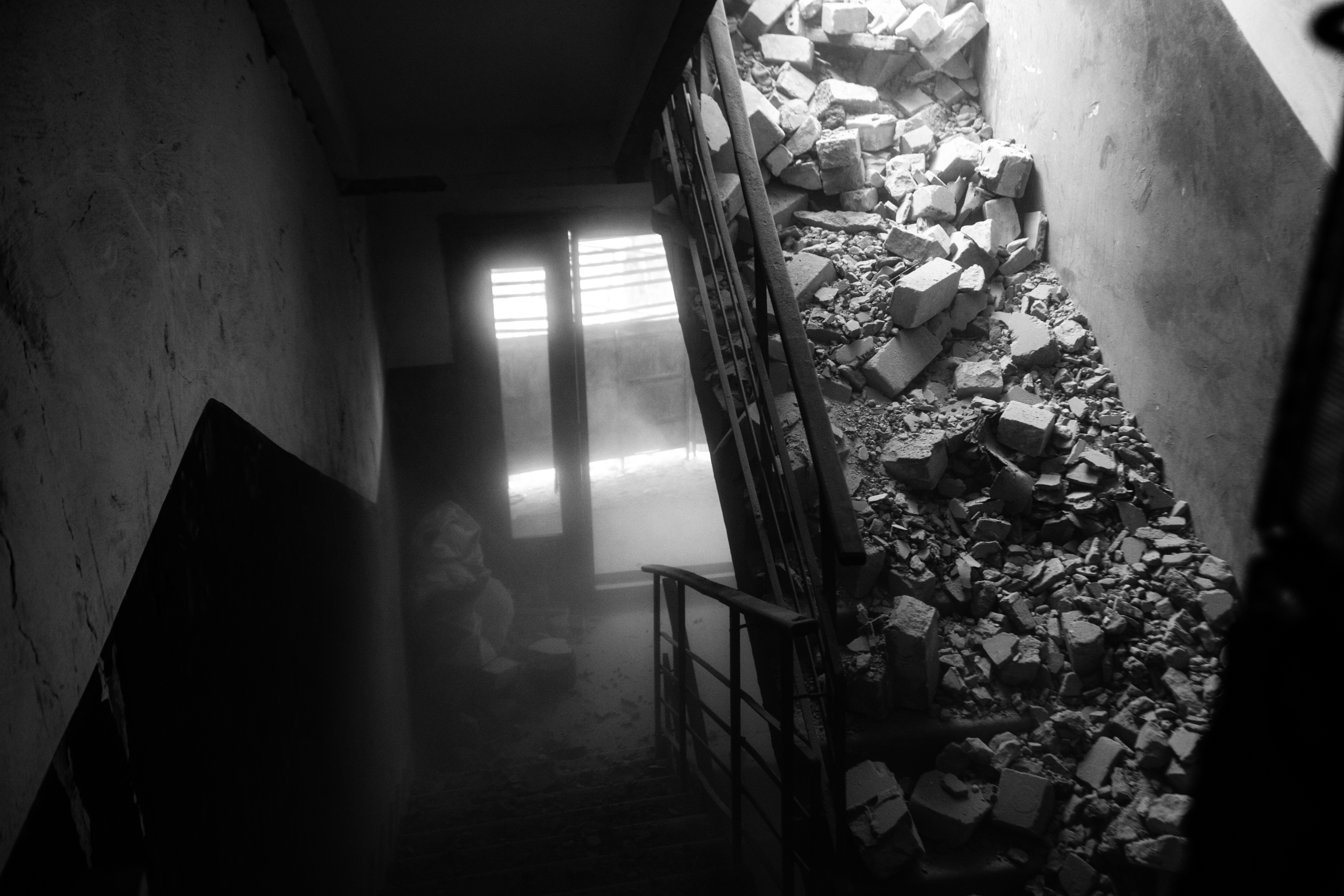
Debris in a residential building, 22 April 2022

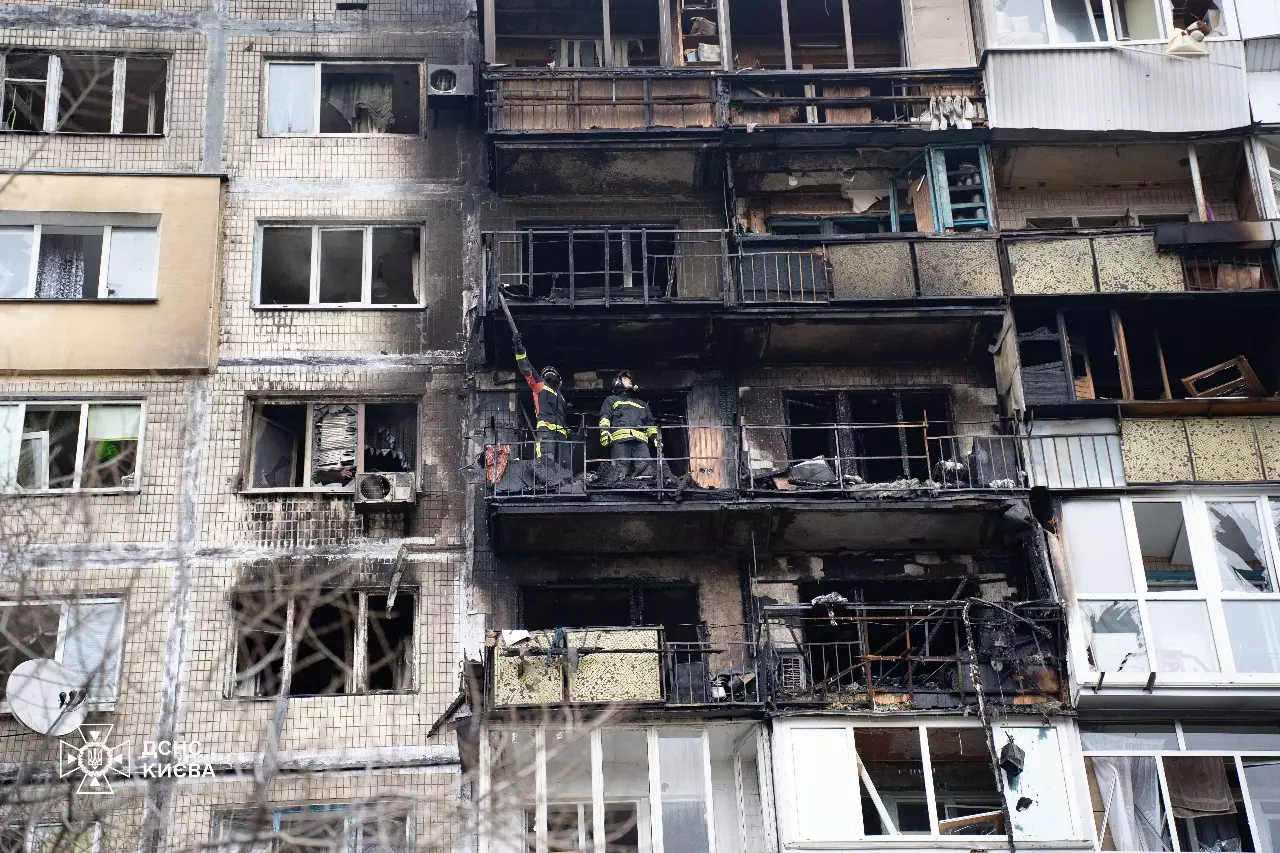
Damage on a residential building after Russian missile strike, 29 November 2025

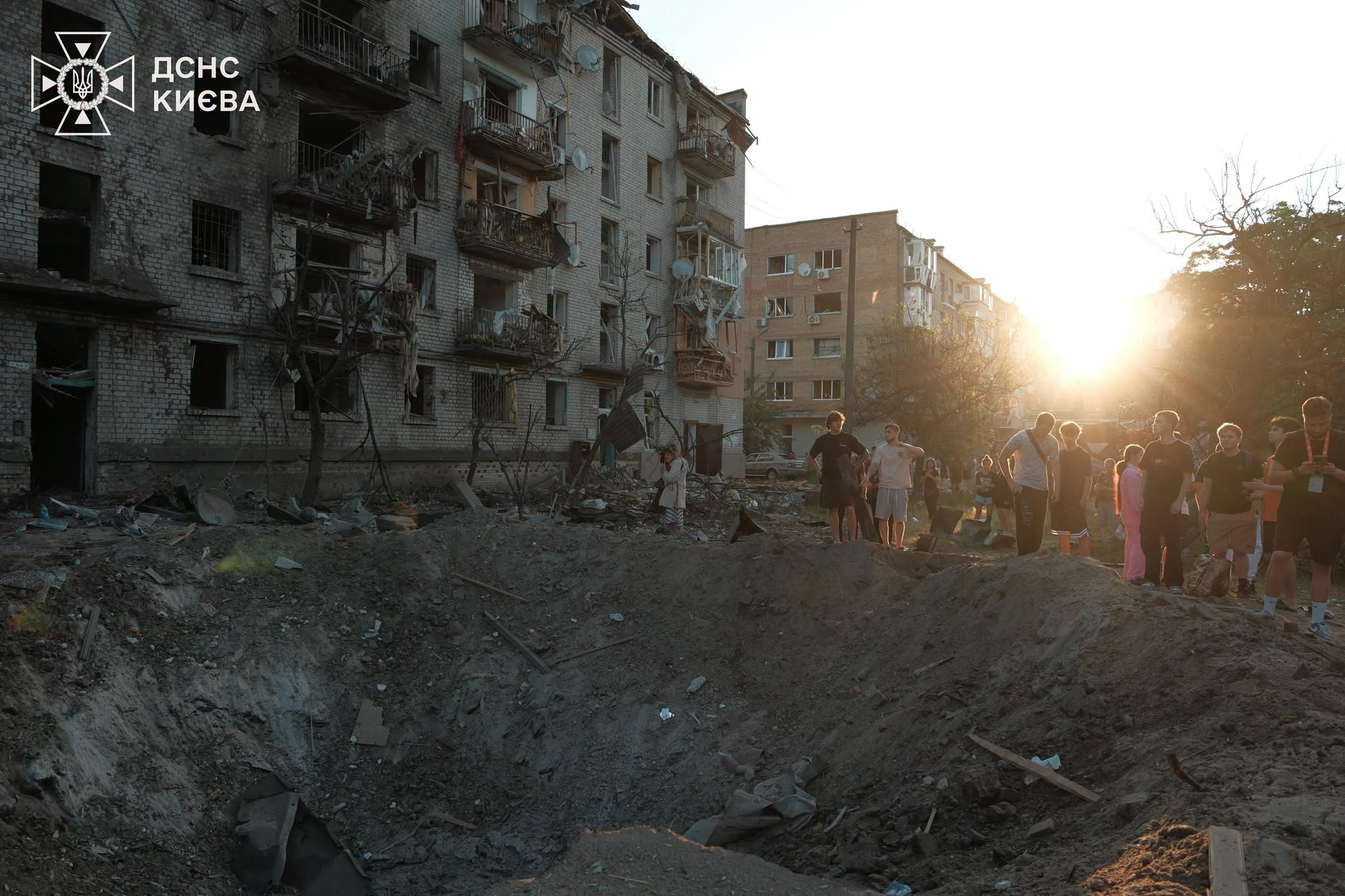
A crater on a Kyiv street after the 2 July 2026 attacks

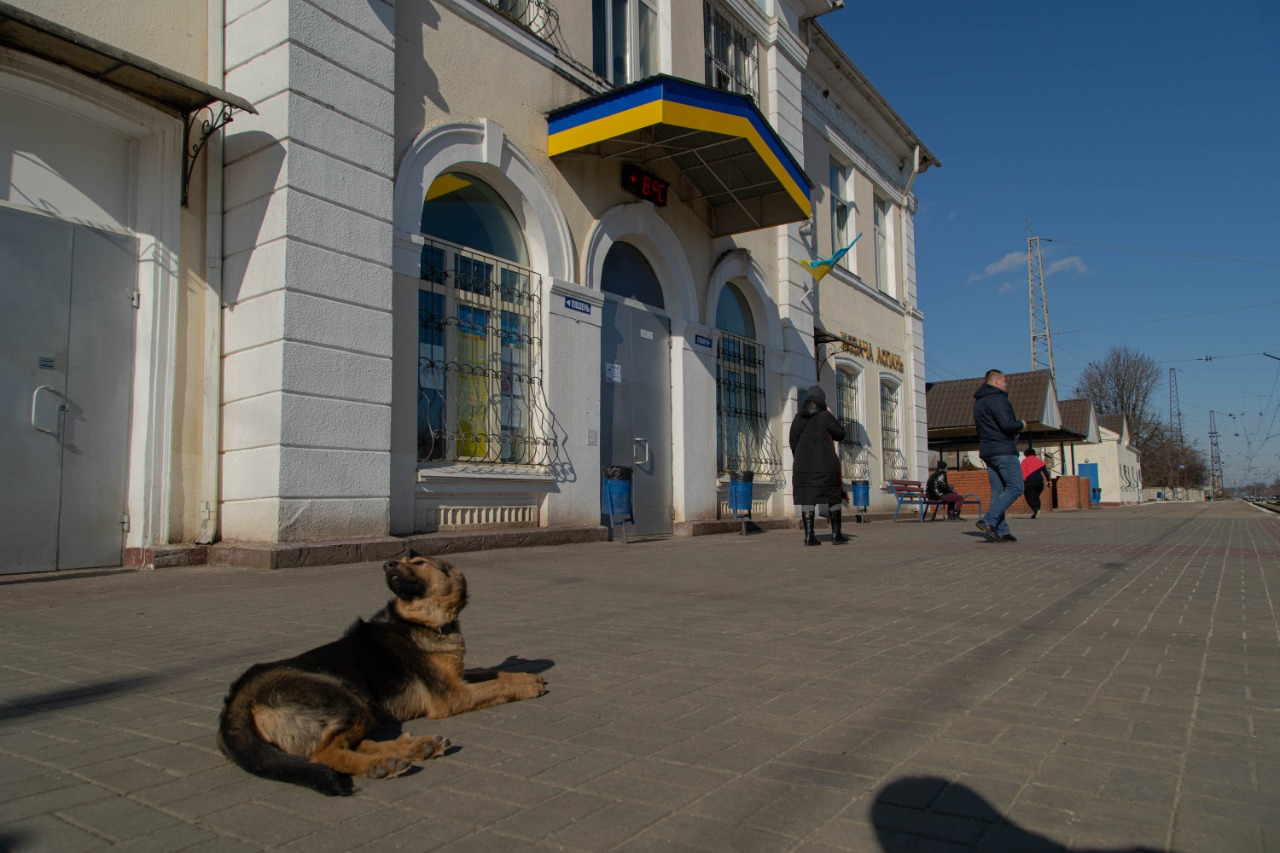
Air raid alarm in Kyiv in 2022

== List of strikes ==
Date	Details	Casualties within the city
25 February 2022	Russian Missiles. One Ukrainian Su-27 was shot down and crashed into a residential building. Pilot Col. Oleksandr Oksanchenko died.	Multiple injured.
26 February 2022	A missile hit a residential building, and a storage facility caught fire.	4 dead, at least 4 injured.
1 March 2022	2 missiles hit Kyiv TV tower, partially knocking out access to news and broadcasts.	5 dead, 5 injured.
15 March 2022	Artillery shelling. A 35-hour curfew was announced by Kyiv's mayor Vitali Klitschko.	At least 4 dead.
20 March 2022	Retroville, a shopping centre located in the Vynohradar historical neighborhood of the Podilskyi District of Kyiv, was bombed in a Russian airstrike. Part of the mall along with its 12-storey business center were destroyed. Further information: Kyiv shopping centre bombing	At least 8 dead.
28 April 2022	Two long-range "air-based weapons" were launched during a visit by the UN Secretary General António Guterres. The attack killed RFE/RL journalist and producer Vira Hyrych.	At least 1 dead.
5 June 2022	Missiles hit the Darnytski and Dniprovski District of Kyiv.	1 injured.
26 June 2022	Long-range missiles fired from Russian bombers around Astrakhan damaged an apartment building and a kindergarten.	1 died, 6 injured.
10 October 2022	Missile strikes, at least one Kh-101 cruise missile was used. Caused power outage in Kyiv.	8 dead.
17 October 2022	28 Iranian-made drones were used, including HESA Shahed 136 (Geran-2). Most were reportedly shot down.	At least 5 died.
23 November 2022	Kh-101 missile was used.	?
14 December 2022	13 Iranian-made drones were used. According to Ukrainian claims, all were shot down by air defense.	None.
16 December 2022	38 air-launched cruise missiles and 22 Kalibr sea-launched missiles were used.	?
19 December 2022	23 Iranian-made Shahed drones launched from the eastern coast of the Sea of Azov were spotted over Kyiv, 18 of them were reportedly intercepted.	None.
29 December 2022	Missile strikes caused power outage, affecting 40% of Kyiv residents. Ukrainian officials claimed 16 missiles were destroyed over Kyiv.	3 injured.
2 January 2023	At least 60 drones targeted Kyiv, some evaded air defense.	1 dead, 1 injured.
14 January 2023	S-400 missiles were fired from Russia's Bryansk Oblast.	?
28 April 2023	Kyiv came under attack after a pause of about two months. Other locations were also attacked.	None.
3 May 2023	Shahed-type drones and missiles. According to Ukrainian claims, all missiles and drones were destroyed in Kyiv airspace by Ukrainian air defense forces.	None.
9 May 2023	25 Kalibr and Kh-101/Kh-555 cruise missiles were launched from the Caspian Sea region, 23 of them were reportedly downed.	None.
16 May 2023	18 different missiles were launched – 9 Kalibr cruise missiles from ships in the Black Sea, 6 Kinzhal hypersonic ballistic missiles, 3 Iskander short-range ballistic missiles from land and 3 drones. According to Ukrainian officials' claims, all were shot down. Ukrainian defense minister Oleksii Reznikov particularly praised the shootdowns of all Kinzhal hypersonic missiles. According to Ukrainian Air Force spokesperson Yurii Ihnat, 6 Kinzhal missiles were used from an estimated Russian reserve of about 50, which was regarded as "a relatively big number" (that is 12%). One of the three MIM-104 Patriot air defense systems provided by the United States to Ukraine was damaged during the attack according to U.S. officials.	3 injured.
25 May 2023	Unspecified number of cruise missiles were launched by Tu-95MS bombers at night from the Caspian Sea region. All were reportedly intercepted in Kyiv's airspace.	?
28 May 2023	In a wave of 59 Shahed drones, 36 were shot down within Kyiv and the region.	?
29 May 2023	Iskander ballistic missiles, possibly also S-300 and S-400 missiles were used. According to Ukrainian officials' claims, all missiles were shot down by air defense.	1 injured.
30 May 2023	31 Iranian-made loitering drones attacked from the north and south. Ukrainian officials claimed that the air defense destroyed 29 of them.	1 dead, 5 injured.
1 June 2023	7 Iskander-M ballistic missiles and 3 Iskander-K missiles were used. All were reportedly shot down.	3 dead due to falling missile debris, 11 injured.
2 June 2023	15 cruise missiles and 21 Shahed drones were reportedly destroyed over Kyiv.	2 injured by falling debris.
13 June 2023	In a preliminary report Kh-101/Kh-555 missiles were fired at night by bombers Tu-95MS from the Caspian Sea, all missiles were reportedly destroyed by air defense.	?
16 June 2023	6 Kalibr cruise missiles, 6 Kinzhal ballistic missiles and two drones were used, according to the Ukrainian Air Force, shortly before the arrival of an African delegation led by South African President Cyril Ramaphosa to Kyiv. No buildings were damaged.	?
20 June 2023	30 Shahed drones were launched, 28 of them were reportedly shot down. The drones were launched from Russian territory to the north and from the coast of the Sea of Azov in the south-east.	None.
1 July 2023	Several Shahed drones were launched, all were reportedly shot down.	One injured, three homes damaged.
21 September 2023	A total of 43 Kalibr cruise missiles, of type Kh-55 and its variants Kh-101 and Kh-555, were air-launched by 10 Russian Tu-95MS bombers, at infrastructure across Ukraine, with an unknown number directed to Kyiv. A total of 36 were shot down by air defense.	3 hospitalized, 21 homes damaged.
25 November 2023	Nearly 75 Shahed drones were launched from Primorsko-Akhtarsk and Kursk Oblast, Russia. A total of 71 of them were intercepted, mainly in the Kyiv region.	At least two injured in Solomianskyi District. Some buildings damaged.
29 December 2023	Lukianivska station and several apartment blocks were damaged by Russian drone and missile attack. Further information: 29 December 2023 Russian strikes on Ukraine	At least 33 killed and 35 injured
21 March 2024	Two ballistic missiles and 29 cruise missiles, possibly of North Korean origin, were shot down over the Kyiv region.	A total of 17 injured by falling debris.
8 July 2024	30 missiles struck Kyiv and other cities, damaging residential buildings, infrastructure, and the Okhmatdyt children's hospital. Further information: 8 July 2024 Russian strikes on Ukraine	At least 22 killed and 82 injured.
26 October 2024	Missiles fired against Kyiv and Dnipro.	2 dead.
3 November 2024	Drone attack against Kyiv, damaging buildings, roads, and power lines.	none
13 November 2024	Four missiles were launched, including two 9K720 Iskander ballistic missiles which were shot down by air defense.	1 injured by falling debris.
26 November 2024	At least 10 Russian drones were shot down by air defense.	None. Some buildings damaged.
20 December 2024	Eight missiles were used, including Kh-47M2 Kinzhal hypersonic missiles and 9K720 Iskander and Hwasong-11A ballistic missiles.	1 dead, 7 injured.
1 January 2025	72 drones were launched, including Shahed drones, of which 47 were shot down by air defense and another 24 were intercepted.	2 dead, 6 injured.
3 January 2025	93 drones were launched, of which 60 were shot down by air defense and another 26 were intercepted.	1 dead, 4 injured.
18 January 2025	39 Shahed drones and four ballistic missiles were launched. Two missiles and 24 drones were shot down by air defense, and 14 other simulator drones were intercepted.	3 dead, 3 injured. Some buildings damaged.
12 February 2025	Seven ballistic missiles and 71 drones were launched, of which six missiles were shot down by air defense.	1 dead, 4 injured. Damage reported in some districts.
11 March 2025	Russian drone attack.	none
23 March 2025	Russian drone attack hits apartment buildings and causes fires.	3 dead, 10 injured
6 April 2025	Russian missile attack	1 dead, 3 injured
24 April 2025	Russia fires drones, ballistic and guided missiles against Kyiv starting at 1:00 a.m. The attack lasts for 11 hours. One residential building collapses.	12 dead, 90 injured
7 May 2025	Russian ballistic missile and drone attack, starting at around 11 a.m.	2 dead, 8 injured
25 May 2025	Russia launches nine Iskander ballistic missiles, 56 cruise missiles, four guided air missiles and 298 attack drones against Ukraine, including against Kyiv.	Dozens injured.
6 June 2025	Russia launches missiles, attack drones against Kyiv.	4 dead, dozen injured, damage to several apartment buildings.
10 June 2025	Russia fires 315 drones against Kyiv. Air raid lasts for five hours, until 5:30 a.m. Seven out of 10 Kyiv districts are hit. Saint Sophia Cathedral, a UNESCO World Heritage Site, is damaged in the assault.	1 dead, four injured.
17 June 2025	Russia fires over 400 munitions of drones and missiles against Kyiv during the night. A strike on a multi-story residential building leads to its collapse, killing 16 residents inside.	28 dead (including a US citizen in the Solomianskyi District), 134 injured.
23 June 2025	Russia fires hundreds of drones and missiles against Kyiv during the night.	10 dead (including an 11-year old girl), 34 injured.
4 July 2025	Russia fires 539 drones and 11 missiles against almost all of Kyiv's districts during the night. Air raid alarm lasts for 8 hours.	1 dead, 26 injured.
9 July 2025	Russia fires around 400 drones and 18 missiles against Kyiv during the night. Targets include houses and residential buildings, cars, warehouse facilities, offices and a health care clinic.	2 dead, a dozen injured.
21 July 2025	Russia fires hundreds of drones and missiles against Kyiv.	1 dead, 9 injured.
28 July 2025	Russian airstrikes against Kyiv. Damage to a residential building and several cars in the Darnytskyi District, but no fires.	8 injured.
31 July 2025	Russian missile and drone strikes against Kyiv. Sviatoshynskyi and Solomyansky districts suffer the brunt of the attacks.	31 dead (including five children), 159 injured.
28 August 2025	The Russian Armed Forces launch nearly 600 drones and more than 30 ballistic and cruise missiles at Kyiv striking multiple residential areas.	at least 23 dead (including 4 children). Dozens injured.
7 September 2025	Russia launched 810 drones, four ballistic missiles and nine cruise missiles. Ukrainian air defenses intercepted most of them, but 54 drones and 9 cruise missiles hit targets across Ukraine. In Kyiv, the Cabinet of Ministers of Ukraine was hit for the first time in the war. Four residential buildings in the Sviatoshynskyi District and one in Darnytskyi District were also damaged.	2 dead (a baby and a young woman), dozens injured.
28 September 2025	Russia launched 500 drones, 40 missiles (including Kinzhal) against Kyiv and the surrounding area. The attack lasted for 12 hours. Darnytskyi, Sviatoshynskyi, Solomianskyi, Holosiivskyi, and Dniprovskyi Districts were hit.	4 dead (including a 12-year old girl), dozens injured.
22 October 2025	Six people are killed and several others are injured in Russian strikes on power plants in Kyiv, Ukraine.	6 dead, several others injured.
14 November 2025	Russian missile and drone strikes on Kyiv and Chornomorsk. Residential areas, energy facilities and the Azerbaijani Embassy in Kyiv damaged.	6 civilians killed, several injured.
29 November 2025	Russian missile and drone strikes against Kyiv. Kinzhal missiles used.	3 people killed, 29 injured.
23 December 2025	Russian missile and drone strikes against energy infrastructure in Kyiv. Power outages across the city.	1 killed, three injured.
27 December 2025	Russian forces fire 40 missiles, including Kinzhal, and 500 drones against Kyiv. Residential buildings targeted in Darnytsia, Holosiivsky and Obolonskyi district.	1 killed, 22 injured.
9 January 2026	Russian forces fire drones against Kyiv during the night. Residential buildings and energy infrastructure targeted.	4 killed, 10 injured.
20–24 January 2026	Russian forces fire hundreds of drones and missiles against Kyiv. Thousands of apartment buildings left without heating, electricity and water during winter. One million people in Kyiv remain without electricity.	1 killed, 4 injured.
22 February 2026	Russian forces fire drones and missiles against Kyiv infrastructure.	1 killed, 5 injured.
14 March 2026	Russian forces fire 430 drones and 68 missiles against Kyiv region during the night.	4 dead, 12 injured.
3 April 2026	Russian forces launch drones and missiles against Kyiv region. Damage in a residential building in Obukhiv; 20 animals died due to damage of a veterinary clinic.	1 dead, 8 injured.
16 April 2026	Russian forces launch 700 drones and dozens of ballistic and cruise missiles against Ukraine, including Kyiv at 2:30 a.m. Podilskyi District targeted.	4 dead, including a 12-year old boy.
24 April 2026	Russian forces launch missiles and drones against Kyiv, including the North Korean Hwasong-11A ballistic missile. See: April 2025 Russian attack on Kyiv.	13 dead.
14 May 2026	Russian forces launch missiles and drones against Kyiv at 3am, and the assault continues during the day. An apartment block collapsed in the Darnytskyi District.	24 dead, 57 injured.
24 May 2026	Russian forces launch missiles and drones against Kyiv at night, as well as hypersonic Oreshnik missile against the city of Bila Tserkva in the Kyiv region. Damaged buildings include: Hinaus gallery, Zhytniy Market, the Taras Shevchenko Institute of Literature, the National Art Museum of Ukraine, the National Chornobyl Museum, the Ukrainian House and the Kyiv Small Opera.	4 dead, 100 injured.
2 June 2026	Russian forces launch ballistic missiles and drones against Kyiv at night. Targets include a petrol station, a construction site, apartment blocks, two houses. Power outages across the city. 41,000 people, including 4,500 children, are hiding in the underground Kyiv Metro.	6 people killed.
15 June 2026	Russian forces launch 70 missiles and 611 drones across Ukraine. Among the targets hit is the Dormition Cathedral, located within the UNESCO World Heritage site of Kyiv Pechersk Lavra monastery complex, founded in 1051, causing a fire. 140,000 Kyiv residents left without without electricity.	4 people killed, 23 injured.
2 July 2026	Russian forces launch 74 missiles and 496 drones mainly targeting Kyiv. Ukraine's air defences intercepted the bulk of the assault, but 25 ballistic missiles and 12 drones still got through, hitting 33 separate locations.	31 people killed, 102 injured.
6 July 2026	Russian forces launched 23 ballistic missiles, 68 missiles and 351 drones at Kyiv, hitting residential high-rises in two districts.	14 people killed,117 injured.
19 July 2026	Russian forces launch 40 Iskander-M and hypersonic Zircon ballistic missiles against Kyiv at 1:30 am. The bombing lasts for five hours. A residential building is set on fire in the central Shevchenkivskyi district.	One dead, several injured.
31 July 2026	Russian forces launch ballistic missiles and drones against Kyiv during the night. Darnytskyi and Solomianskyi District were attacked the most. A missile lands near the Lithuanian embassy.	9 dead, 29 injured.
5 August 2026	Russian forces launch ballistic missiles and drones against Kyiv during the night. No ballistic missiles intercepted due to shortage of Patriot systems.	17 dead, 29 wounded.
7 August 2026	Russian forces launch ballistic missiles and drones in the Kyiv metropolitan area.	4 dead, including a 3-year old boy and his grandparents.
20 August 2026	Russian forces launch ballistic missiles and drones against Kyiv. Strikes damage a hospital, a school, a preschool, residential buildings and several warehouses. Russian drones enter territory of Romania and Moldova.	17 dead, dozens wounded.
29 August 2026	Russian drone strikes a weapons depot in Myla, the Kyiv region. The explosion damages 130 houses, and the nearby care home for the elderly and disabled.	38 dead, 42 injured, 400 evacuated.
11 September 2026	Russian jet-powered drones strike two petrol stations in Kyiv.	2 dead, 12 injured
27 September 2026	Russian drones strike a market.	2 killed, 10 injured
28 September 2026	Russian forces strike Kyiv's National Academy of Sciences, pharmaceutical company and gas stations with one-way attack drone.	4 dead, 8 injured
7 October 2026	Russian forces strike Kyiv. Suspected unexploded Russian Iskander missile crashes.	2 dead
18 October 2026	Russian forces strike Kyiv. One person killed in the Desnianskyi District, a metro station damaged. Cosmo Multimall shopping and entertainment center hit in the Solomianskyi District.	1 dead, 8 injured
13 November 2026	Russian drone strikes the 2nd floor of the National Institute of Traumatology and Orthopedics in Kyiv, at 3:00am, Shevchenkivskyi District.	3 injured
20 November 2026	Russian missile and drone attacks in 20-30 minutes intervals, targeting three bridges in Kyiv on the Dnieper, water utility facility, and power stations.	6 killed

== See also ==
- List of military engagements during the Russo-Ukrainian war (2022–present)
- Russian attacks on civilians in the Russo-Ukrainian war (2022–present)
- Russian strikes against Ukrainian infrastructure (2022–present)
- Russian war crimes
