= List of military engagements during the Russo-Ukrainian war (2022–present) =

Military situation in Ukraine

This is a list of military engagements during the Russo-Ukrainian war (2022–present), encompassing land, naval, and air engagements as well as campaigns, operations, defensive lines and sieges. Campaigns generally refer to broader strategic operations conducted over a large territory and over a long period. Battles generally refer to short periods of intense combat localised to a specific area and over a specific period. However, use of the terms in naming such events is not consistent.

== Battles ==
Name	Oblast	Start date	End date	Front	Result of the battle
Battle of Antonov Airport	Kyiv	24 February 2022	25 February 2022	Northern	Russian victory and subsequent withdrawal
Capture of Chernobyl	Kyiv	24 February 2022	24 February 2022	Northern	Russian victory and subsequent withdrawal
Battle of Kharkiv	Kharkiv	24 February 2022	13 May 2022	Eastern	Ukrainian victory
Battle of Sumy	Sumy	24 February 2022	early March 2022	Northern	Ukrainian victory
Siege of Chernihiv	Chernihiv	24 February 2022	4 April 2022	Northern	Ukrainian victory
Siege of Mariupol	Donetsk	24 February 2022	20 May 2022	Eastern, southern	Russian victory
Battle of Kyiv	Kyiv City	25 February 2022	2 April 2022	Northern	Ukrainian victory
Battle of Hostomel	Kyiv	25 February 2022	1 April 2022	Northern	Ukrainian victory (Note: City under Russian control from 5 March through 1 April 2022.)
Capture of Melitopol	Zaporizhzhia	25 February 2022	26 February 2022	Southern	Russian victory and ongoing occupation
Battle of Volnovakha	Donetsk	25 February 2022	12 March 2022	Eastern	Russian victory
Battle of Mykolaiv	Mykolaiv	26 February 2022	8 April 2022	Southern	Ukrainian victory
Battle of Bucha	Kyiv	27 February 2022	31 March 2022	Northern	Ukrainian victory (Note: City under Russian control from 12 March through 31 March 2022.)
Battle of Irpin	Kyiv	27 February 2022	9 March 2022	Northern	Ukrainian victory
Battle of Makariv	Kyiv	27 February 2022	25 March 2022	Northern	Ukrainian victory
Battle of Kherson	Kherson	1 March 2022	1 March 2022	Southern	Russian victory, occupation (March–November 2022)
Battle of Voznesensk	Mykolaiv	2 March 2022	3 March 2022	Southern	Ukrainian victory
Battle of Izium	Kharkiv	3 March 2022	1 April 2022	Eastern	Russian victory
Battle of Enerhodar	Zaporizhzhia	4 March 2022	4 March 2022	Southern	Russian victory and ongoing occupation
Battle of Moshchun	Kyiv	5 March 2022	21 March 2022	Northern	Ukrainian victory
Battle of Brovary	Kyiv	9 March 2022	1 April 2022	Northern	Ukrainian victory
Battle of Rubizhne	Luhansk	17 March 2022	12 May 2022	Eastern	Russian victory
Battle of Slavutych	Kyiv	23 March 2022	26 March 2022	Northern	Russian victory and subsequent withdrawal (Note: City recaptured by Ukraine on 28 March 2022 after a Russian withdrawal)
Battle of Popasna	Luhansk	18 April 2022	7 May 2022	Eastern	Russian victory
Battle of Marinka	Donetsk	18 April 2022	25 December 2023	Eastern	Russian victory
Battle of the Siverskyi Donets	Luhansk	5 May 2022	13 May 2022	Eastern	Ukrainian victory
Battle of Sievierodonetsk	Luhansk	6 May 2022	25 June 2022	Eastern	Russian victory
Battle of Lysychansk	Luhansk	25 June 2022	2-3 July 2022	Eastern	Russian victory
Battle of Bakhmut	Donetsk	3 July 2022	20 May 2023	Eastern	Russian victory
Battle of Pisky	Donetsk	28 July 2022	24 August 2022	Eastern	Russian victory (Note: Russian defence ministry claimed control on the 13 of August, it was confirmed by geolocated footage on the 24 of August)
Battle of Soledar	Donetsk	3 August 2022	16 January 2023	Eastern	Russian victory
Battle of Vuhledar	Donetsk	28 October 2022	1 October 2024	Eastern	Russian victory
Battle of Mala Tokmachka	Zaporizhzhia	7 June 2023	9 June 2023	Southern	Russian victory
Battle of Avdiivka	Donetsk	10 October 2023	17 February 2024	Eastern	Russian victory
Battle of Chasiv Yar	Donetsk	4 April 2024		Eastern	Ongoing
Battle of Krasnohorivka	Donetsk	8 April 2024	9 September 2024	Eastern	Russian victory
Battle of Ocheretyne	Donetsk	16 April 2024	28 April 2024	Eastern	Russian victory
Battle of Toretsk	Donetsk	18 June 2024	7 August 2025	Eastern	Russian victory
Battle of Kurakhove	Donetsk	16 October 2024	early January 2025	Eastern	Russian victory
Battle of Kostiantynivka	Donetsk	25 October 2025		Eastern	Ongoing

== Campaigns and offensives ==
Name	Oblast	Start date	End date	Front	Result
Snake Island campaign	Odesa	24 February 2022	30 June 2022	Southern	Ukrainian victory
Northern Ukraine border skirmishes	Sumy Oblast, Chernihiv Oblast, Ukraine, and Kursk Oblast, Russia	29 March 2022		Northern	Ongoing
Kherson counteroffensive	Kherson and Mykolaiv	29 August 2022	11 November 2022	Southern	Ukrainian victory
Dnieper campaign	Kherson, Mykolaiv and Zaporizhzhia	1 September 2022		Southern	Ongoing
Kharkiv counteroffensive	Kharkiv, Donetsk and Luhansk	6 September 2022	1 October 2022	Eastern	Ukrainian victory
Lyman front	Donetsk	3 September 2022	1 October 2022	Eastern	Ukrainian victory
Luhansk Oblast campaign	Kharkiv and Luhansk	19 September 2022		Eastern	Ongoing
2023 Bryansk Oblast raid	Bryansk Oblast, Russia	2 March 2023	2 March 2023	Russia	Inconclusive
2023 Belgorod Oblast incursions	Belgorod Oblast, Russia	22 May 2023	17 December 2023	Russia	Inconclusive
2023 Ukrainian counteroffensive	Donetsk, Kherson and Zaporizhzhia	4 June 2023	December 2023	Eastern	Russian victory
Raids on the Tendra Spit	Kherson	28 February 2024	7 August 2024	Southern	Russian victory
March 2024 western Russia incursion	Belgorod Oblast and Kursk Oblast, Russia	12 March 2024	7 April 2024	Russia	Inconclusive
2024 northern Kharkiv offensive	Kharkiv	10 May 2024	June 2024	Eastern	Inconclusive
Kharkiv Oblast campaign (2024–present)	Kharkiv	10 May 2024		Eastern	Ongoing
Pokrovsk offensive	Donetsk	18 July 2024	January 2026	Eastern	Russian victory
Kursk campaign	Kursk Oblast, Russia	6 August 2024	March 2025	Russia	Russian victory
Velyka Novosilka offensive	Donetsk	11 November 2024	28 January 2025	Eastern	Russian victory
Kupiansk offensive	Kharkiv	29 November 2024		Eastern	Ongoing
2025 Sumy offensive	Sumy	19 February 2025	26 June 2025	Northern	Inconclusive
Novopavlivka offensive	Donetsk and Dnipropetrovsk	28 March 2025	11 February 2026	Eastern	Inconclusive
2025 Dobropillia offensive	Donetsk	11 August 2025	29 November 2025	Eastern	Ukrainian victory
Huliaipole offensive	Dnipropetrovsk and Zaporizhzhia	11 September 2025	January 2026	Southern	Russian victory
2026 Ukrainian counteroffensive	Dnipropetrovsk, Donetsk and Zaporizhzhia	11 February 2026		Southern	Ongoing
2026 Dobropillia offensive	Donetsk	22 July 2026		Eastern	Ongoing

== Notable non-battle attacks ==
Name	Location	Date	Attacker	Target
Odesa strikes	Odesa, Odessa Oblast, Ukraine	24 February 2022–present	Russia	Targets in the Odesa area
Chuhuiv air base attack	Chuhuiv, Kharkiv Oblast, Ukranine	24 February 2022	Russia	Ukrainian air base
Millerovo air base attack	Millerovo air base, Millerovo Oblast, Russia	25 February 2022	Ukraine	Russian air base
Chornobaivka attacks	Kherson International Airport, Kherson, Russian controlled Ukraine	27 February–5 November 2022	Ukraine	Russian-controlled airport
Vinnytsia strikes	Vinnytsia, Vinnytsia Oblast, Ukraine	6 March 2022 - 17 July 2022	Russia	Ukrainian Airbase, and Air Force command center
Yavoriv military base attack	Yavoriv, Lviv Oblast, Ukraine	13 March 2022	Russia	Ukrainian military base
7 March 2022 Mykolaiv military barracks attack	Soliany, Mykolaiv Oblast, Ukraine	7 March 2022	Russia	Ukrainian military base
18 March 2022 Mykolaiv military quarters attack	Mykolaiv Oblast, Ukraine	18 March 2022	Russia	Ukrainian military base
Berdiansk port attack	Berdiansk, Zaporizhzhia Oblast, Russian controlled Ukraine	24 March 2022	Ukraine	Russian naval ship
Sinking of the Moskva	Black Sea	13 April 2022	Ukraine	Russian Slava-class cruiser Moskva
Desna barracks airstrike	Desna, Chernihiv Oblast, Ukraine	17 May 2022	Russia	Ukrainian military barracks
Attack on Nova Kakhovka	Nova Kakhovka, Kherson Oblast, Russian controlled Ukraine	11 July 2022	Ukraine	Russian military forces & an ammunition depot
2022 Saky air base attack	Saky Air Base, Crimea, Russia	9 August 2022	Ukraine	Russian air base
2022 Crimean Bridge explosion	Crimean Bridge, Crimea, Russia	8 October 2022	Ukraine	Crimean Bridge section
Strikes on Ukrainian infrastructure	Ukraine	10 October 2022–present	Russia	Critical infrastructure and facilities
Makiivka military quarters shelling	Makiivka, Donetsk Oblast, Russian controlled Ukraine	31 December 2022–1 January 2023	Ukraine	Russian military forces and an ammunition depot
Wagner Group rebellion	Russia	23–24 June 2023	Wagner Group	Russian Ministry of Defence
Zarichne airstrike	Zarichne, Zaporizhzhia Oblast, Ukraine	3 November 2023	Russia	Ukrainian military barracks
2023 Belgorod shelling	Belgorod Oblast, Russia	30 December 2023	Ukraine (Note: Claimed to be Russian air defense by Ukraine)	Attack on Belgorod Oblast bordering Ukraine
2024 Belgorod strike	Belgorod Oblast, Russia	15 February 2024	Ukraine	Targets in the Belgorod Oblast
September 2024 Poltava strike	Poltava Oblast, Ukraine	3 September 2024	Russia	Military Institute of Telecommunications and Information Technologies
Cherkaske missile attack	Dnipropetrovsk, Ukraine	3 March 2025	Russia	Ukrainian military training camp
2025 Sumy airstrike	Sumy, Ukraine	13 April 2025	Russia	Congress Center of the Sumy State University, city of Sumy.
2025 Russian strikes on Ukrainian training grounds	Dnipropetrovsk and all over Ukraine	1 June 2025	Russia	Ukrainian military training camps
Operation Spiderweb	Olenya, Dyagilevo, Ivanovo, Belaya, and Ukrainka airbases, Russia	1 June 2025	Ukraine	Russian Air Force's Long-Range Aviation assets at five air bases.

== Outside Russia and Ukraine ==
Name	Location	Date	Attacker	Target
2022 Zagreb Tu-141 crash	Zagreb, Croatia	10 March 2022	Ukraine	Unintentional out-of-control drone strike in Croatia.
2022 missile explosion in Poland	Przewodów, Lublin Voivodeship, Poland	15 November 2022	Ukraine	Unintentional out-of-control missile strike which damaged the Polish village of Przewodów.
Azerbaijan Airlines Flight 8243	Near Aktau International Airport, Aktau, Kazakhstan	25 December 2024	Russia	Unintentional downing of civilian international passenger flight after being hit mid-flight by a Russian missile during efforts to repel a Ukrainian drone attack.
2025 Russian drone incursion into Poland	Eastern, central and northern Poland	9–10 September 2025	Russia	Unarmed drones entered Poland's airspace after allegedly being launched from Russia. Up to four drones were confirmed to have been shot down, most by the Dutch Air Force.
Ukrainian attacks on oil tankers	Black Sea, Mediterranean Sea, and other seas	28 November 2025–present	Ukraine	A series of military operations conducted by the Security Service of Ukraine against Russian oil tankers.

== See also ==
- Russo-Ukrainian war
- Timeline of the Russo-Ukrainian war (2022–present)
- Russo-Ukrainian war (2022–present) order of battle
- Combatants of the war in Donbas
- List of Russian generals killed during the Russo-Ukrainian war (2022–present)
- List of Ukrainian flag officers losses during the Russo-Ukrainian war
- Territorial control during the Russo-Ukrainian war
- List of battles involving Russia
