= List of battles involving Russia =

This is a list of battles involving the Russian Federation.

Battle	Date	Allies	Enemies
Second Chechen War (1999–2009)
Battle of Grozny	1999–2000	Russia	Ichkeria; Chechen Mujahideen
Battle for Height 776	2000	Russia	Ichkeria; Chechen Mujahideen
Battle of Komsomolskoye	2000	Russia	Ichkeria
Zhani-Vedeno ambush	2000	Russia	IIB
Galashki ambush	2000	Russia	Ichkeria
Battle for Vedeno	2001	Russia	Ichkeria
Tsotsin-Yurt operation	2001–2002	Russia	Ichkeria
Grozny OMON ambush	2002	Russia	Ichkeria
Nazran raid	2004	Russia	Caucasian Front; Ichkeria; Vilayat Ghalghaiche
Avtury raid	2004	Russia	Ichkeria; Chechen Mujahideen
Grozny raid	2004	Russia	Ichkeria
Dagestan raids	2005	Russia	Caucasian Front
Nalchik raid	2005	Russia	Caucasian Front
Gimry fighting	2006	Russia	Caucasian Front
Avtury ambush	2006	Russia	Caucasian Front
Zhani-Vedeno ambush	2007	Russia	Ichkeria
Russo-Georgian War (2008)
Battle of Tskhinvali	2008	Russia; South Ossetia	Georgia
Battle of the Kodori Valley	2008	Abkhazia; Russia	Georgia
Battle off the coast of Abkhazia	2008	Russia	Georgia
Occupation of Poti	2008	Russia	Georgia
Occupation of Gori	2008	Russia; South Ossetia	Georgia
Insurgency in the North Caucasus (2009–2017)
Tsentoroy attack	2010	Russia	Caucasus Emirate
Grozny clashes	2014	Russia	Caucasus Emirate
Russo-Ukrainian War (2014–present)
Annexation of Crimea	2014	Russia	Ukraine
Battle in Shakhtarsk Raion	2014	NAF; Russia	Ukraine
Battle of Ilovaisk	2014	NAF; Russia	Ukraine
Battle of Novoazovsk	2014	NAF; Russia	Ukraine
Second Battle of Donetsk Airport	2014–2015	NAF; Russia	Ukraine
Battle of Debaltseve	2015	NAF; Russia	Ukraine
Battle of Avdiivka (2017)	2017	Donetsk PR; Russia	Ukraine
2022 Snake Island campaign	2022	Russia	Ukraine
Battle of Antonov Airport	2022	Russia	Ukraine
Capture of Chernobyl	2022	Russia	Ukraine
Battle of Kharkiv (2022)	2022	Russia	Ukraine
Battle of Kherson	2022	Russia	Ukraine
Battle of Okhtyrka	2022	Russia	Ukraine
Battle of Sumy	2022	Russia	Ukraine
Siege of Chernihiv	2022	Russia	Ukraine
Siege of Mariupol	2022	Russia; Donetsk PR	Ukraine
Battle of Kyiv (2022)	2022	Russia	Ukraine
Battle of Hostomel	2022	Russia	Ukraine
Capture of Melitopol	2022	Russia	Ukraine
Battle of Volnovakha	2022	Russia; Donetsk PR	Ukraine
Battle of Lebedyn	2022	Russia	Ukraine
Battle of Mykolaiv	2022	Russia	Ukraine
Battle of Bucha	2022	Russia	Ukraine
Battle of Irpin	2022	Russia	Ukraine
Battle of Makariv	2022	Russia	Ukraine
Battle of Enerhodar	2022	Russia	Ukraine
Battle of Voznesensk	2022	Russia	Ukraine
Battle of Izium	2022	Russia	Ukraine
Battle of Moshchun	2022	Russia	Ukraine
Battle of Huliaipole	2022	Russia	Ukraine
Battle of Brovary	2022	Russia	Ukraine
Battle of Rubizhne	2022	Russia; Luhansk PR	Ukraine
Battle of Marinka	2022-2023	Russia; Donetsk PR	Ukraine
Battle of Slavutych	2022	Russia	Ukraine
Battle of Popasna	2022	Russia; Luhansk PR	Ukraine
Battle of the Siverskyi Donets	2022	Russia	Ukraine
Battle of Sievierodonetsk (2022)	2022	Russia; Luhansk PR; Donetsk PR	Ukraine
Battle of Davydiv Brid	2022	Russia	Ukraine
Battle of Lysychansk	2022	Russia; Luhansk PR	Ukraine
Battle of Pisky	2022	Russia; Donetsk PR	Ukraine
Battle of Bakhmut	2022-2023	Russia; Donetsk PR	Ukraine
Battle of Soledar	2022-2023	Russia; Donetsk PR; Luhansk PR	Ukraine
2022 Kherson counteroffensive	2022	Russia; Donetsk PR; Luhansk PR	Ukraine
2022 Kharkiv counteroffensive	2022	Russia; Donetsk PR; Luhansk PR	Ukraine
Battle of Lyman (September–October 2022)	2022	Russia; Luhansk PR	Ukraine
Luhansk Oblast campaign	2022	Russia	Ukraine
Battle of Vuhledar	2022-2024	Russia; Donetsk PR	Ukraine
2023 Ukrainian counteroffensive	2023	Russia	Ukraine
Battle of Mala Tokmachka	2023	Russia	Ukraine
Battle of Avdiivka (2023–2024)	2023-2024	Russia	Ukraine
Velyka Novosilka Offensive	2024-2025	Russia	Ukraine
Kursk campaign	2024-2025	Russia	Ukraine
Battle of Toretsk	2024-2025	Russia	Ukraine
Battle of Chasiv Yar	2024-2025	Russia	Ukraine
Battle of Ocheretyne	2024	Russia	Ukraine
Battle of Krasnohorivka	2024	Russia	Ukraine
Battle of Kurakhove	2024-2025	Russia	Ukraine
Raids on the Tendra Spit	2024	Russia	Ukraine
Pokrovsk offensive	2024-2025	Russia	Ukraine
Huliaipole offensive	2025-2026	Russia	Ukraine
2025 Sumy offensive	2025–present	Russia	Ukraine
Battle of Kostiantynivka	2025–present	Russia	Ukraine
Novopavlivka offensive	2025–present	Russia	Ukraine
Dobropillia offensive	2025	Russia	Ukraine
Intervention in Syria (2015––2024)
Northwestern Syria offensive	2015	Syria; Iran; Russia	(Syria) Opposition
Aleppo offensive	2015	Syria; Iran; Russia	(Syria) Opposition ISIS
Homs offensive	2015	Syria; Russia	ISIS
Latakia offensive	2015–2016	Syria; Russia	(Syria) Opposition
Sukhoi Su-24 shootdown	2015	Russia	Turkey
East Aleppo offensive	2015–2016	Syria; Iran; Russia	ISIS
Hama offensive	2015	Syria; Russia	(Syria) Opposition
Orontes River offensive	2015–2016	Syria; Russia	(Syria) Opposition
Second Battle of Al-Shaykh Maskin	2015–2016	Syria; Russia	(Syria) Opposition
Deir ez-Zor offensive	2016	Syria; Russia	ISIS
Northern Aleppo offensive	2016	Syria; Iran; Russia	(Syria) Opposition
Khanasir offensive	2016	Syria; Russia	ISIS
Battle of al-Qaryatayn	2016	Syria; Russia	ISIS
Palmyra offensive	2016	Syria; Russia; Iran	ISIS
Southern Aleppo campaign	2016	Syria; Iran; Russia	(Syria) Opposition
Aleppo bombings	2016	Syria; Russia	(Syria) Opposition
Ithriyah-Raqqa offensive	2016	Syria; Russia	ISIS
Aleppo campaign: First offensive; Second offensive	2016	Syria; Iran; Russia	(Syria) Opposition
Latakia offensive	2016	Syria; Russia	(Syria) Opposition
