= 30 December 2023 Belgorod shelling =

Airstrikes during the Russian invasion of Ukraine

- Part of attacks in Russia during the Russo-Ukrainian war
- Location: Belgorod, Belgorod Oblast, Russia
- Date: 30 December 2023 (UTC+3)
- Deaths: 25 (Note: Including five children.)
- Injuries: 108 (Note: Including 17 children.)
- Perpetrator: Armed Forces of Ukraine (claimed by Russia)

On 30 December 2023, during the Russo-Ukrainian war, explosions occurred in the city of Belgorod, Russia, killing at least 25 people and wounding over 100. Russian sources said the explosions were shelling by the Ukrainian Armed Forces. Ukraine attributed the explosions to the work of Russian air defence.

Russia also reported that it had shot down drones in other Russian cities the same day. The attack occurred a day after Russia launched airstrikes at multiple cities in Ukraine, killing 57 and wounding 160. The Russian Defense Ministry called the strikes a "terrorist attack" that would "not go unpunished", launching 49 drones at Ukrainian cities the following days in retaliation.

It is reportedly the single largest death toll in a Russian city since the beginning of the war on 24 February 2022.

== Background ==
The explosions took place amid Russian mass missile and drone attacks against Ukraine, including Russia's largest-ever wave of attacks against Ukraine and an emergency meeting at the UN Security Council on 29 December 2023, further strikes on Kharkiv on 30 December, and another wave of Russian strikes and the Russian accidental bombing of a village in Voronezh Oblast on 2 January 2024.

The same day, Russian officials claimed that 32 Ukrainian drones were shot down over Moscow, Bryansk, Oryol, and Kursk Oblasts. They also claimed that two people, including a nine-year old child, were killed and four others were injured in separate instances of shelling in Bryansk and Belgorod Oblasts.

== Attacks on Belgorod ==
Firefighters eliminate the consequences of the shelling. Belgorod, 30 December 2023

The explosions in Belgorod, only about 40 kilometers from the border with Ukraine, took place in daylight hours. The Russian Defense Ministry claimed that Czech-made unguided Vampire rockets (range 20.5 km) and guided Vilkha missiles (range 130 km) fitted with cluster-munition warheads were used and were believed to have originated from a multiple rocket launcher in Kharkiv Oblast. According to the BBC it is unlikely that Vampire rockets can reach Belgorod from Ukrainian territory without modification work to boost its range. Among locations hit according to a source close to the Russian Investigative Committee were an ice skating rink located in the city's Cathedral Square, a shopping center, a sports center, and a university.

Twenty-five people, including five children, were reported to have been killed in the attacks, while 108 people, including 17 children, were injured.

A source from the Ukrainian security services told the BBC that its forces had launched more than 70 drones against Russian military targets in "response to Russia's terrorist attacks on Ukrainian cities and civilians", and attributed events in Belgorod to the "incompetent work of Russian air defence", which led to falling fragments. Residents also told independent Russian media outlets that air raid sirens were only heard 30 minutes following the start of the attacks, and that several designated bomb shelters had been locked, while others were not aware of where to seek shelter due to government policy that ruled against the disclosure of the locations of designated shelters.

== Response ==
The Russian Ministry of Defence vowed to avenge the attack, while continuing to attack only "military facilities and infrastructure directly related to them."

Later that evening, Russia conducted missile strikes on Kharkiv, injuring 28 people in what the Russian Defence Ministry said was a direct response to the attacks on Belgorod. It also claimed to have struck only military installations there using high-precision missiles, although Kharkiv's mayor Ihor Terekhov said the missiles struck civilian infrastructure instead, including "cafes, residential buildings and offices". The Ministry of Internal Affairs of Ukraine reported damage to 12 blocks of flats, 13 homes, hospitals, a hotel building, a kindergarten, commercial premises, a gas pipeline and cars.

The Russian Defence Ministry also claimed "a missile strike on the former Kharkiv Palace Hotel" had killed "representatives of the Defence Intelligence of Ukraine and the Armed Forces of Ukraine directly involved in the planning and execution" of the attack in Belgorod. It also claimed that the attack on the building of the Security Service of Ukraine (SBU) in Kharkiv Oblast and the temporary deployment point of the Right Sector, which it described as a "nationalist group", had killed "SBU personnel, foreign mercenaries and fighters of the Kraken unit," whom it accused of "subversive actions on Russian territory." Ukrainian intelligence dismissed the claims, stating they were "the sick delusions of the terrorist regime."

== Aftermath ==
On 5 January 2024, the governor of Belgorod Oblast, Vyacheslav Gladkov, said that several families comprising at least 100 individuals were evacuated from Belgorod city to Stary Oskol, Gubkin and Korochansky District due to the attacks. By 8 January, the number of evacuees reached 300, while requests were made to transfer 1,300 children to schooling camps elsewhere in Russia.

Midnight masses for Orthodox Christmas that were due on 6 January as well as Epiphany celebrations scheduled on 19 January were also cancelled due to the attacks.

== Reactions ==
The Kremlin said Russian President Vladimir Putin had been briefed on the attacks, and that health minister Mikhail Murashko would join a team of emergency workers to Belgorod. Foreign ministry spokeswoman Maria Zakharova said to the Russian news agency TASS that the United Kingdom and the United States were culpable for the "terrorist attack" on Belgorod for allegedly inciting "the Kyiv regime to carry out terrorist actions." She also accused European Union countries that supply weapons to Ukraine of responsibility.

At an emergency meeting of the United Nations Security Council, Russian ambassador Vasily Nebenzya denounced the attacks, to which Ukraine and its allies responded by blaming Putin for starting the war. In response, the French envoy said that Ukraine was defending itself under UN laws, while the U.S. and the UK stated that Putin was responsible for Russian deaths by starting the war. UN assistant secretary-general Mohammed Khiari said strikes against civilians and civilian infrastructure "violate international humanitarian law, are unacceptable and must end now".

== See also ==
- 2023 Belgorod Oblast incursions
- Belgorod city missile strike
- Attacks in Russia during the Russian invasion of Ukraine
