= Kyiv metropolitan area =

Largest metropolitan area in Ukraine

Kyiv metropolitan area Київська агломерація
- Urban area
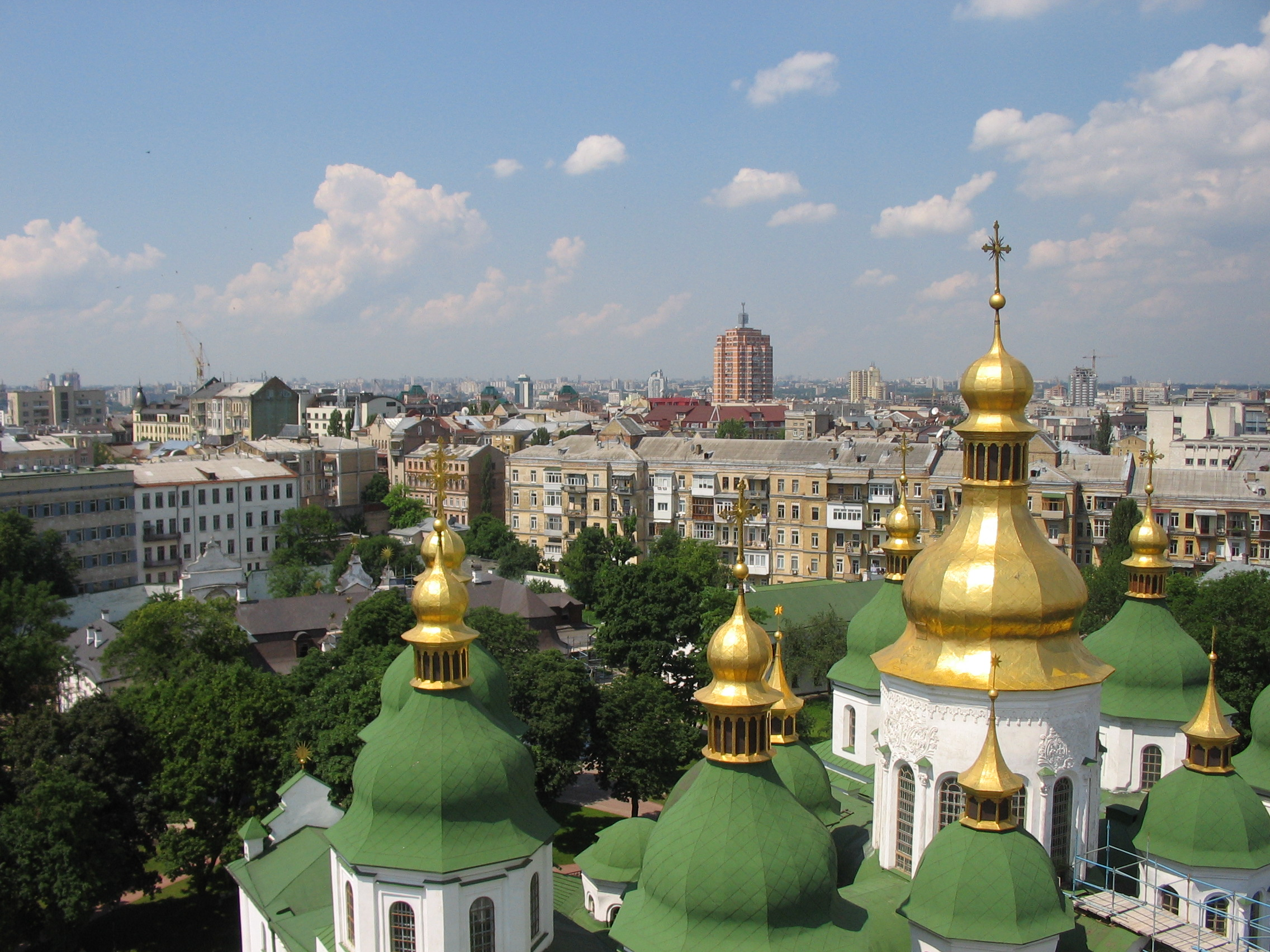
- Skyline of Kyiv

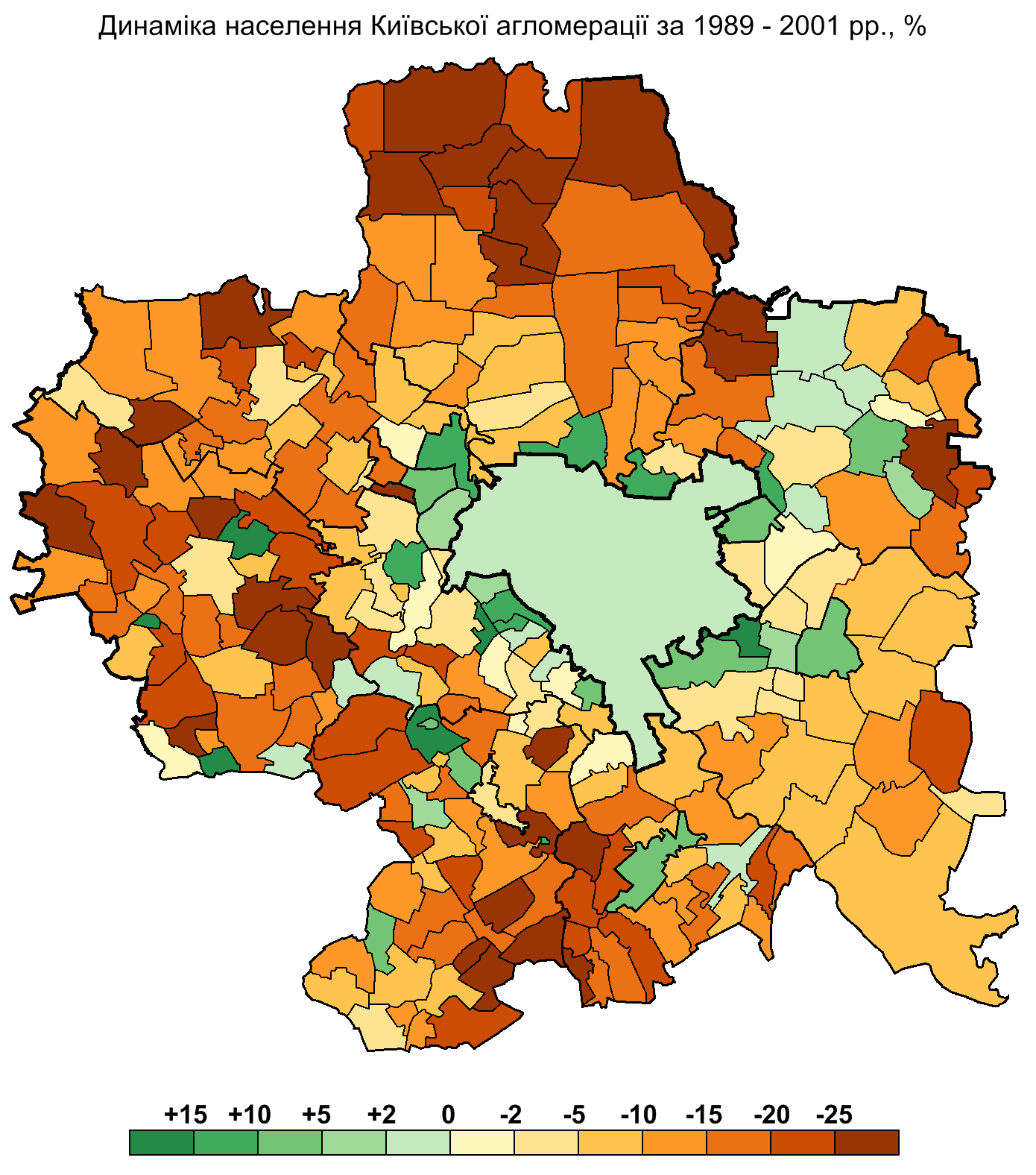
- Population change in Kyiv agglomeration
- Country: Ukraine
- Oblasts: Kyiv; Kyiv
- Largest city: Kyiv

Area
  - Metro: 13,534 km^{2} (5,226 sq mi)

Population
  - Metro: 4,280,000
  - Metro density: 303/km^{2} (780/sq mi)

GDP (nominal, 2021)
  - Metro: ₴1.568 trillion (€40.6 billion)

The Kyiv metropolitan area (Ukrainian: Київська агломерація, romanized: Kyivska ahlomeratsiia) is an unofficially designated urban agglomeration within the outer boundary of Kyiv Oblast in Ukraine. The metropolitan area is not officially defined, but it generally includes Kyiv and surrounding suburban and satellite settlements within Kyiv Oblast that are closely integrated with the capital through commuting, economic activity, and infrastructure. It is ranked among the 10 largest metropolitan areas in Europe.

== Area and population ==
In 2010, CityPopulation.de estimated the population of the Kyiv agglomeration at approximately 3.375 million, ranking it among the world’s largest urban areas. In contrast, PopulationData.net estimated the population at around 4.64 million, reflecting a broader definition of the metropolitan region.

Since the onset of the war in Donbas in 2014, and particularly following the full-scale Russian invasion of Ukraine in 2022, the population of Kyiv and its metropolitan area has increased significantly due to the arrival of hundreds of thousands of internally displaced persons (IDPs).

Estimates of Kyiv’s city proper population have varied considerably over time. Official figures list 2,847,200 residents as of July 2013, while the 2001 Ukrainian census recorded 2,611,300 inhabitants. Alternative estimates have placed the population at at least 3.5 million as early as 2007, based on indirect indicators such as the volume of bakery products sold in the city, which account for commuters and temporary residents. More recent estimates suggest a population of approximately 2.95 million in 2022 and around 3.02 million in 2024.

The population of the suburban settlements within the Kyiv metropolitan area has been estimated at approximately 1.1 million, though figures vary depending on the boundaries used.

The total area of the metropolitan region, based on administrative-territorial units commonly associated with the Kyiv agglomeration, is 13,534 km², resulting in an estimated population density of roughly 268 people per square kilometer under conservative definitions, and higher under broader estimates.

== Economy ==
In 2021, Kyiv metropolitan area had a Gross regional product of around ₴1.568 trillion (€40.6 billion) of which ₴1.276 trillion (€33 billion) was Kyiv city.

== Transport ==
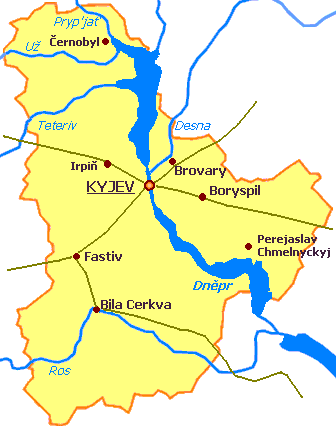
Simplified map of the major railway lines in Kyiv Oblast.

The area has a highly developed railway and road infrastructure, being linked to Kyiv through the suburban railways, buses and minibuses.

The Kyiv metropolitan area is served by two international passenger airports: Boryspil Airport and Kyiv (Zhuliany) Airport; there are also the Hostomel cargo airport and an additional three operating airfields facilitating airplane manufacturing and general aviation.
