= February 2024 Belgorod missile strike =

Attack during the Russo-Ukrainian War

- Part of Attacks in Russia during the Russian invasion of Ukraine
- Location: Belgorod, Belgorod Oblast, Russia
- Date: 15 February 2024
- Deaths: 7 (including a 1-year-old girl)
- Injuries: 18
- Perpetrator: Armed Forces of Ukraine

On 15 February 2024, Ukraine fired several missiles at Russia’s Belgorod Oblast which borders the country. According to Russian officials, fourteen missiles were shot down but one hit and "heavily damaged" a shopping center in Belgorod city. Seven civilians, including a one-year-old girl, were killed, while 18 others were injured. Another missile struck a sports stadium.

== Background ==
Belgorod lies about 30 km (19 miles) from the border with Ukraine. On 30 December 2023, Belgorod was shelled by Ukrainian forces, killing 25 civilians and injuring 108. The Russian Defense Ministry called the strikes a "terrorist attack" that would "not go unpunished", launching 49 drones at Ukrainian cities the following days in retaliation.

== Strike ==
Russian state media claimed that Ukraine fired several missiles at Belgorod Oblast and that 14 were shot down but one hit and "heavily damaged" a shopping center in Belgorod city killing seven civilians, including a one-year-old girl, and injuring 18 others. Another missile struck a sports stadium. Videos posted on social media showed several ambulances parked outside a heavily damaged shopping centre with shattered windows. Russia claimed the missiles were fired from a RM-70 multiple rocket launcher. Ukraine has not commented on the strikes.

== See also ==
- Timeline of the Russian invasion of Ukraine (1 December 2023 - present)
- 30 December 2023 Belgorod shelling
