= April 2025 Russian attack on Kyiv =

2025 missile attack on Kyiv

- Part of the attacks on civilians in the Russian invasion of Ukraine
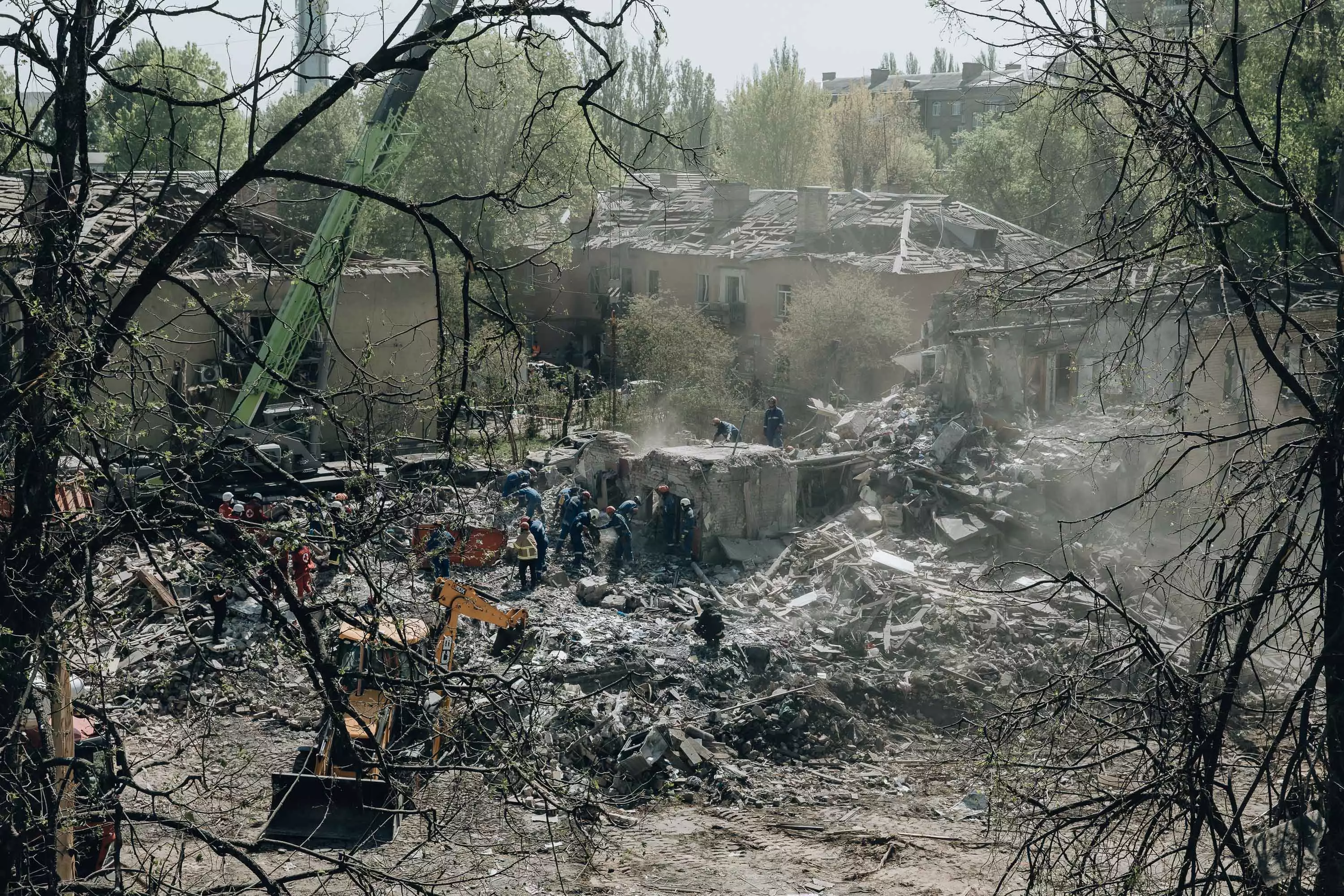
- Destroyed apartment building after the attack
- Location: Kyiv
- Date: 24 April 2025; 18 months ago
- Attack type: Missile strike
- Weapon: KN-23 ballistic missile
- Deaths: 13
- Injuries: 90+
- Perpetrators: Russia; North Korea (Note: A North Korean missile, the KN-23, was used in the attack.)

On the night of April 24, 2025, Russia launched an attack on Kyiv using cruise and ballistic missiles (Kh-101, Iskander-M/Iskander-K, KN-23, Kalibr, and Kh-59/Kh-69), as well as attack drones. As a result of the Russian strike, the cities of Kyiv, Kharkiv, and Zaporizhzhia, as well as the Kyiv, Kharkiv, Dnipropetrovsk, Zhytomyr, Khmelnytskyi, Poltava, and Sumy regions were affected. The attack resulted in the deaths of 13 Ukrainians, and injuries to over 90 others, making it one of the deadliest attacks on Kyiv in the Russian invasion of Ukraine since 2022.

== Consequences of the strike ==
=== Kyiv ===
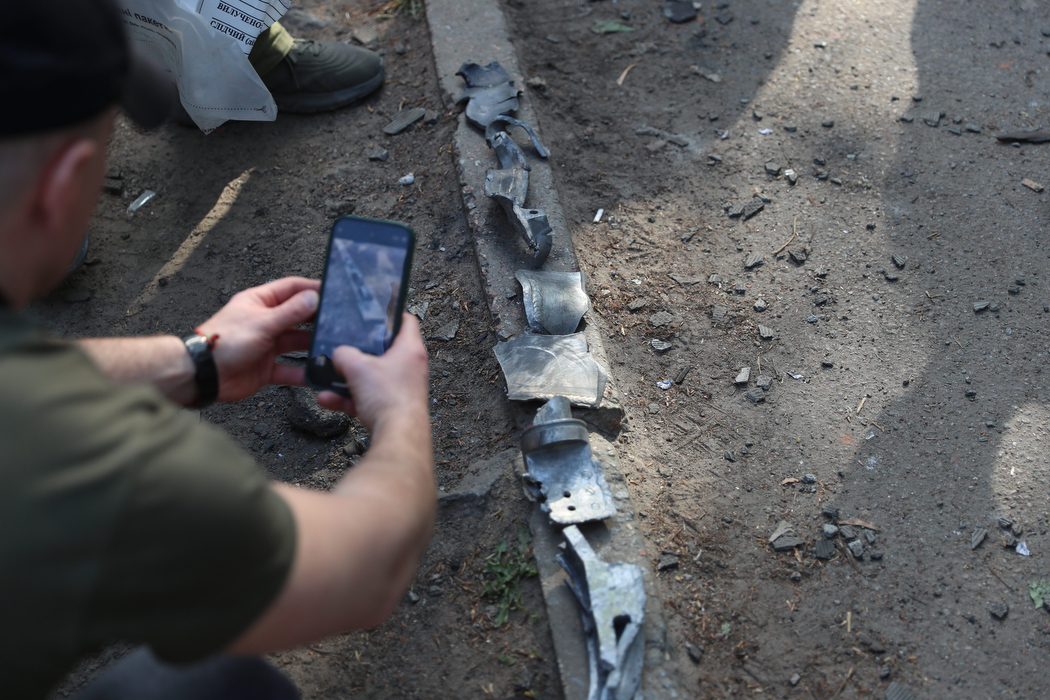
Remains of the missile that struck Kyiv on April 24, 2025

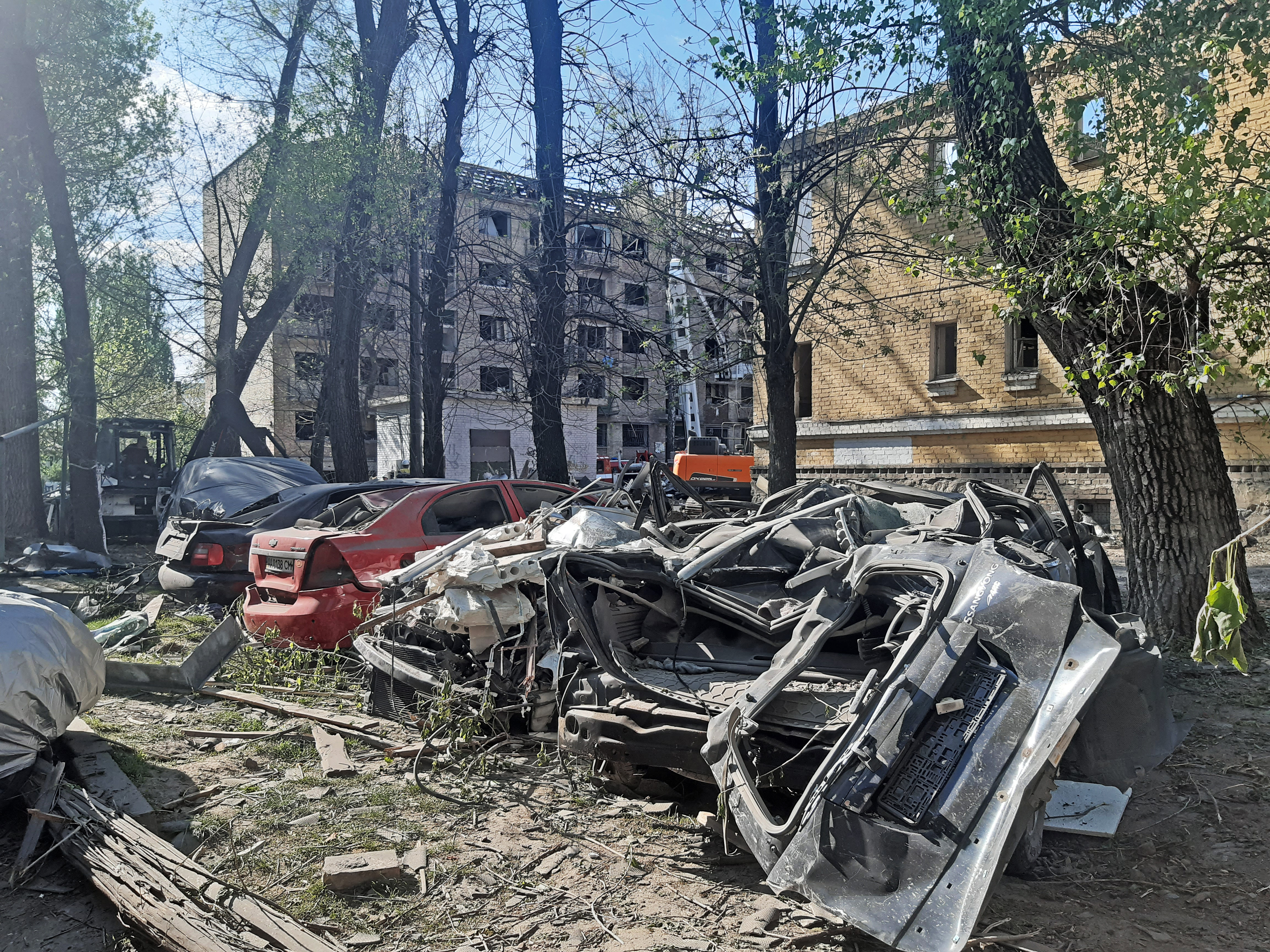
Consequences of the Russian attack on 24.04.2025

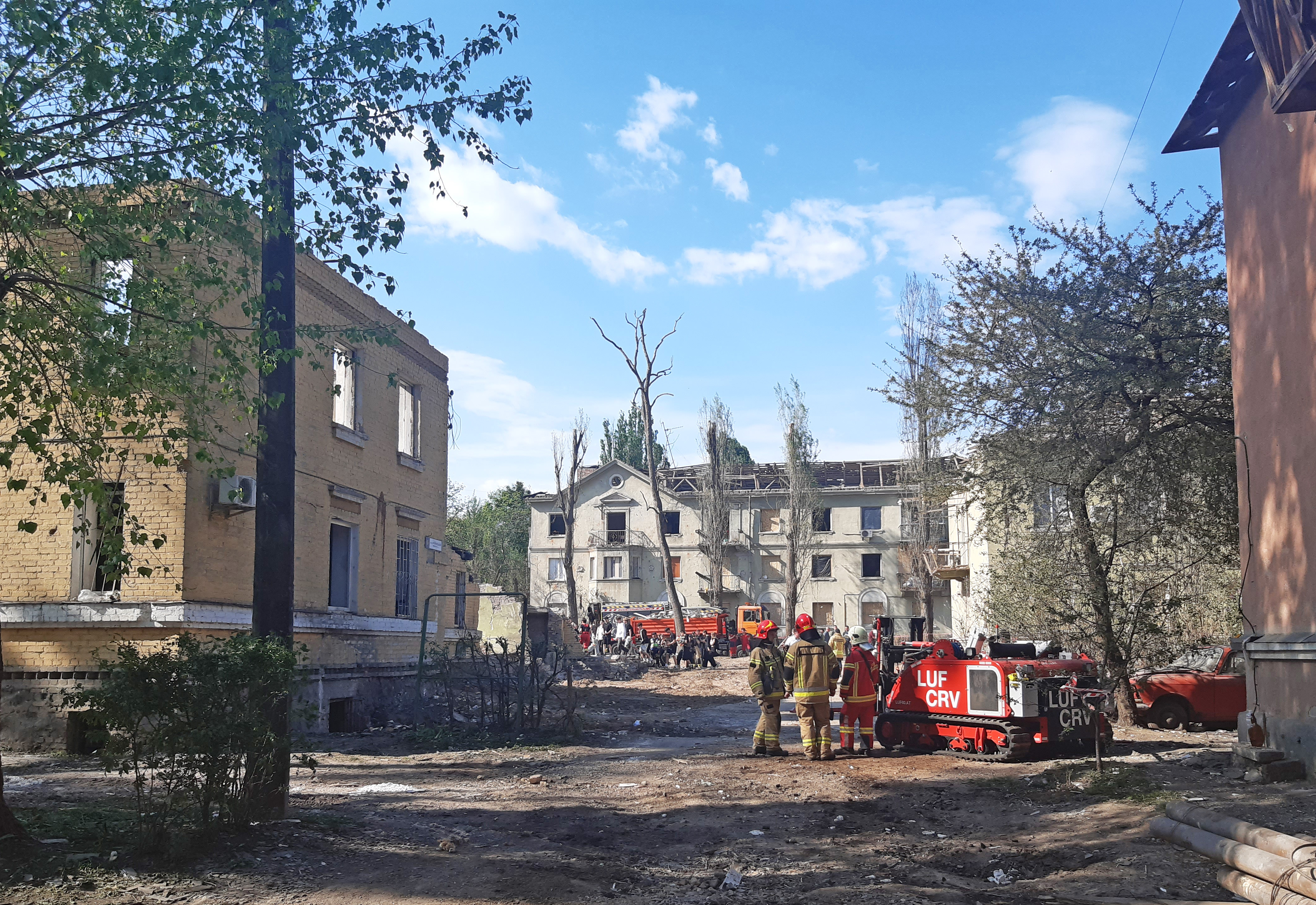
Clearing the ruins after the Russian attack

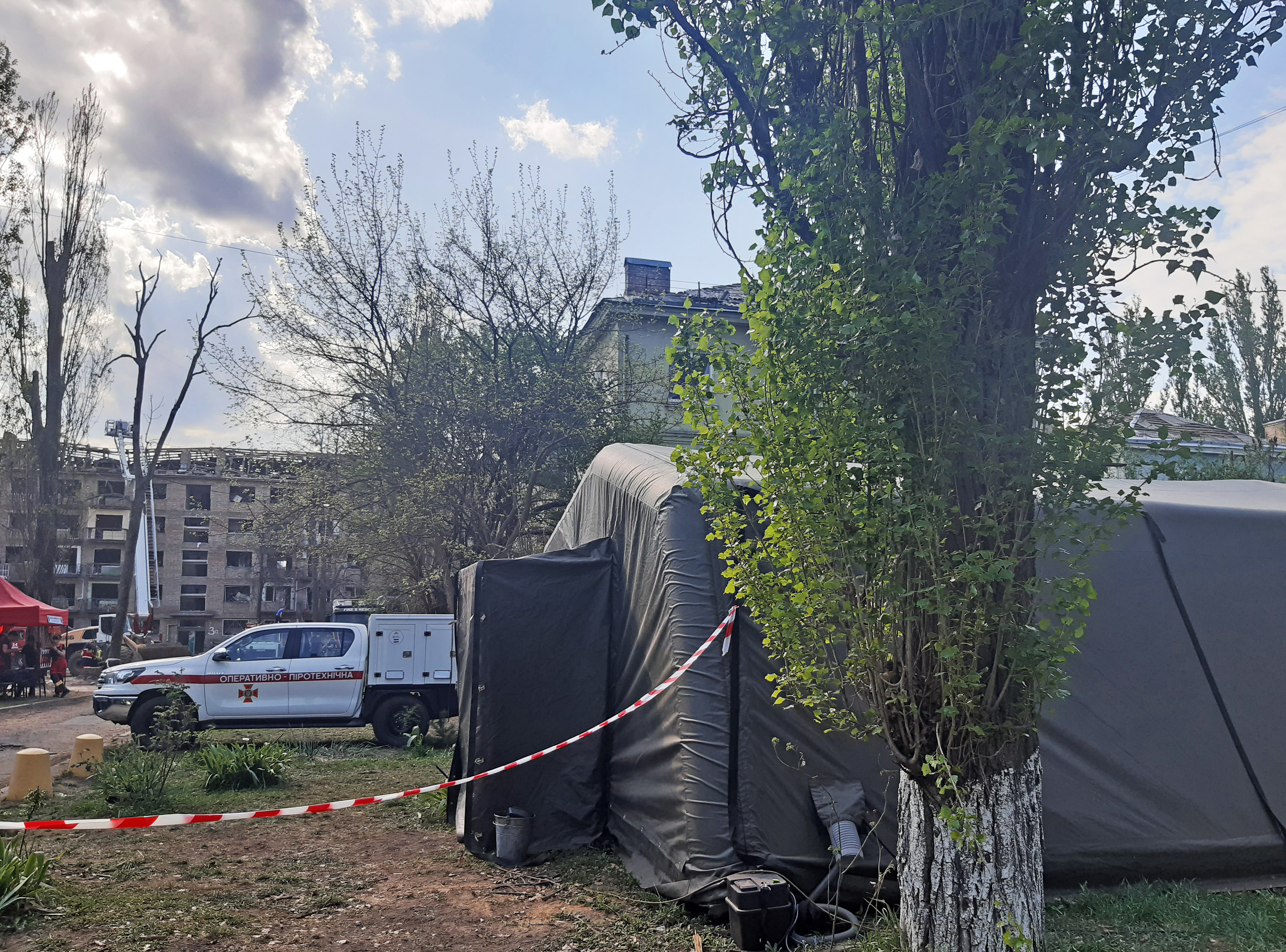
Aid points for victims of the Russian attack

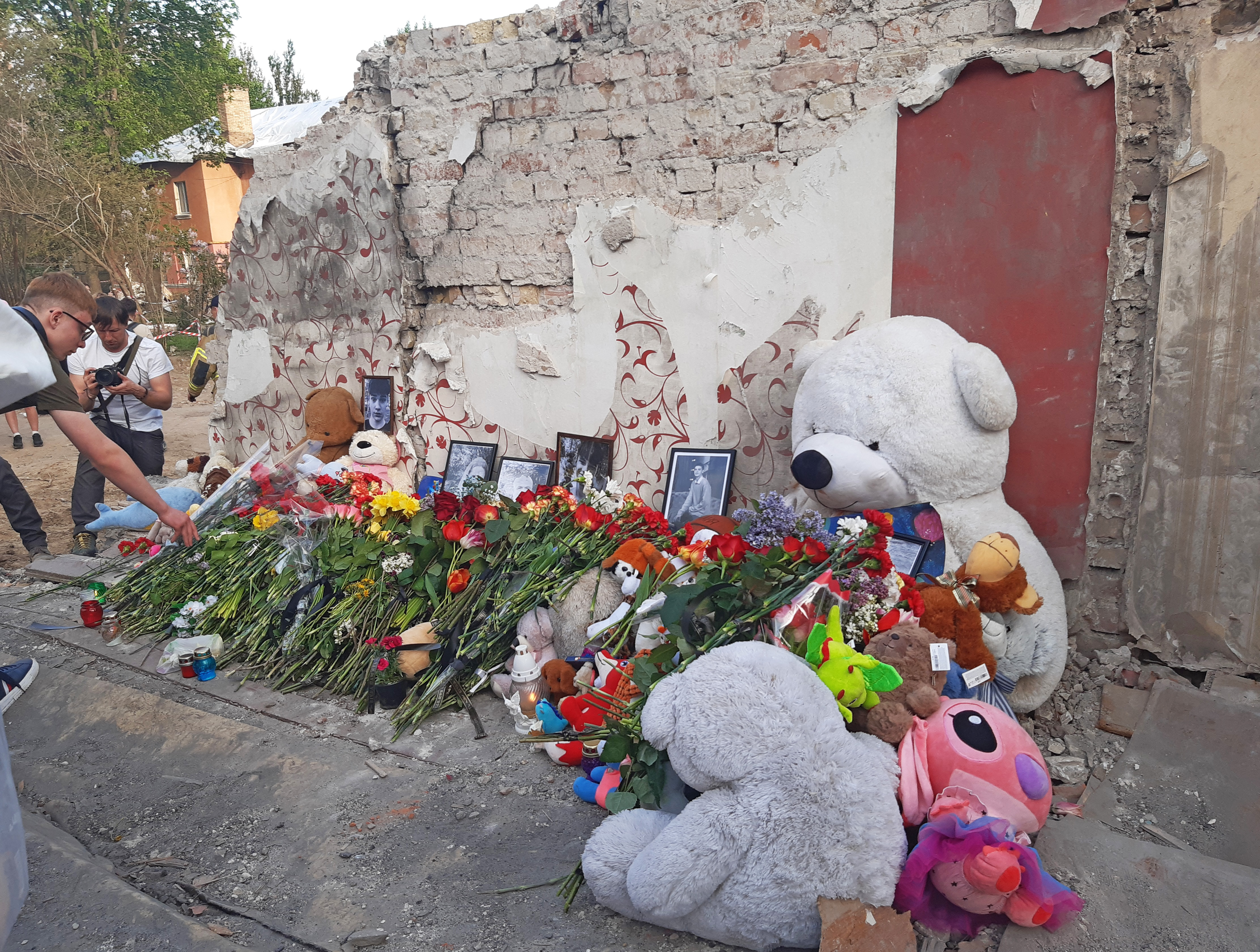
Commemoration of the dead in Kremeneckyi Lane (Kyiv) after the Russian attack on April 24, 2025

Kyiv suffered the most: emergency responders worked at 13 locations. The Ukrainian president, Volodymyr Zelenskyy, confirmed that the missile that struck Kyiv was a North Korean Hwasong-11A (KN-23).

As of 13:30 on April 28, 13 fatalities due to the Russian strike were recorded. Over 90 people were injured.

Tragic consequences in the Sviatoshynskyi District. There, residents of a destroyed building were trapped under the rubble. The Central Wedding Palace in Kyiv was also damaged. On April 25, a day of mourning was declared in Kyiv. President Volodymyr Zelenskyy, officials, and diplomats visited the site of the attack in the Sviatoshynskyi district and honored the memory of the victims.

=== Kyiv Oblast ===
In the Bucha Raion, three five-story residential buildings were damaged. A fire on the roof of one of them was extinguished. Also damaged were 4 stores, 8 cars, and a public transport stop.

In the Brovary and Vyshhorod raions, fires of dry grass and forest litter were controlled. In addition, in the Vyshhorod Raion, a warehouse and three cars were damaged.

=== Kharkiv ===
14 enemy drones and 11 missiles of various types approached the city in waves and from several directions. Six people were injured, including a child. As a result of the strikes, multi-story and private houses, an educational institution, and infrastructure objects were damaged.

As a result of one of the strikes, which hit the Novobavarskyi District, windows were broken in adjacent multi-story buildings. There are also reports of damage to private houses in the Osnovianskyi District.

=== Zhytomyr Oblast ===
A renewed strike was inflicted on the State Emergency Service unit that arrived at the site of a fire extinguishing operation in Zhytomyr Oblast. A 39-year-old rescuer was injured.

=== Sumy Oblast ===
Around 04:00, the Russian Armed Forces attacked an agricultural enterprise in the Nedryhailivska hromada of the Romny Raion with 4 kamikaze drones of the “Geran-2” type. Two people were injured.

=== Khmelnytskyi Oblast ===
As a result of the attack, a fire broke out, which was extinguished by units of the SES. A gas distribution point was damaged (without interrupting gas supply), the roofs of two residential buildings, windows, and doors in five apartments of a multi-apartment building were damaged. Damage was also recorded to the summer playground of the park of culture and recreation.

One man sustained a minor leg injury and was taken to the hospital. A minor sustained a leg cut from glass, hospitalization was not required.

== Reactions ==
President Volodymyr Zelenskyy called Russia’s night attack on Kyiv one of the most complex and linked it to Russia’s desire to pressure the US. He said this at a joint press conference with South African President Cyril Ramaphosa after talks in Pretoria. "Today’s attack is certainly one of the most complex, the most brazen from Russia. 215, if I am not mistaken, strike drones, ballistic and other missiles were recorded hitting civilian infrastructure, people, residential areas, various infrastructure. This is a serious strike," he said.

=== International ===
- United States — US president Donald Trump condemned the attack on Truth Social, saying he was "not happy with the Russian strikes on Kyiv", calling them "unnecessary and badly timed". He then urged Russian president Vladimir Putin to stop the attacks, and to "get the peace deal done".
- France — French President Emmanuel Macron called on the international community not to forget who the real culprit of the war is. He emphasized that "the anger of the USA should be directed exclusively at Putin." "We stand for sovereignty and territorial integrity, respecting international law. We will continue to defend the right of the Ukrainian people to live in peace on their territory and within their internationally recognized borders," he said.

=== Non-government and intergovernmental organizations ===
- United Nations — Resident and Humanitarian Coordinator in Ukraine Matthias Schmale condemned the attack as a flagrant violation of international humanitarian law.
- The Organization for Security and Cooperation in Europe (OSCE) convened a special permanent council, stating the necessity to hold the Russian Federation accountable to achieve a just peace.
