= 29 December 2023 Russian strikes on Ukraine =

Airstrikes during the Russian invasion of Ukraine

- Part of the Russo-Ukrainian war (2022–present)
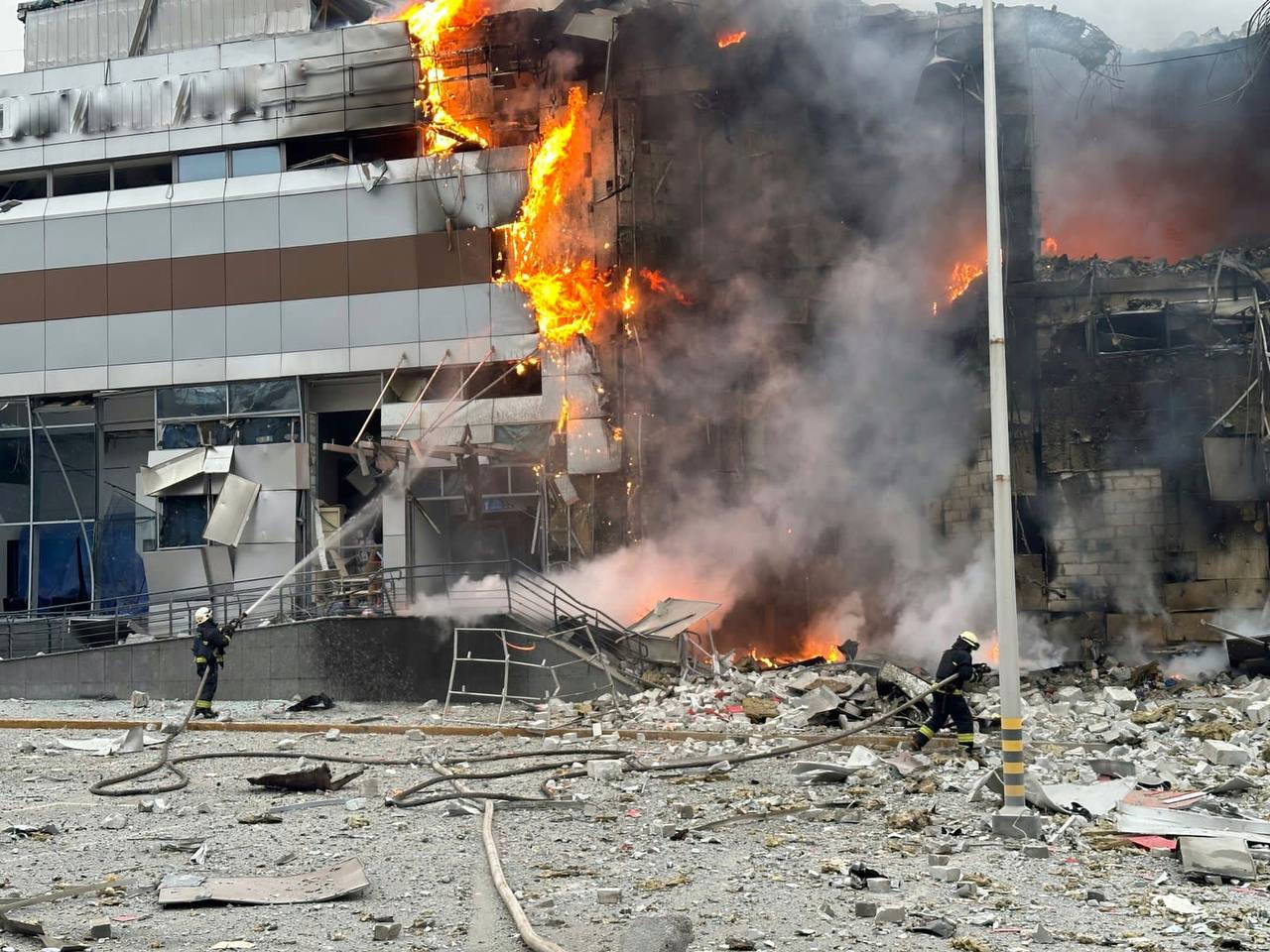
- Aftermath of a missile strike on a shopping mall in Dnipro
- Location: Regions across Ukraine
- Date: 29 December 2023; Early morning
- Attack type: Airstrikes
- Deaths: 58
- Injuries: >160
- Perpetrator: Russian Armed Forces

In the early morning hours of 29 December 2023, Russia launched what was seen to be the largest wave of missiles and drones yet seen in the Russo-Ukrainian War, with hundreds of missiles and drones hitting the Ukrainian capital Kyiv and other cities across the country. At least 58 people were reported to have been killed in the attacks, while 160 others were injured.

== Attack ==
=== Overview ===
According to Ukrainian officials at least 122 cruise and ballistic missiles and 36 drones were launched, killing at least 58 people and injuring more than 160 in an overnight nationwide attack that lasted up to 18 hours. The Ukrainian Air Force claimed to have intercepted 87 missiles and 27 drones. No Kh-22s were intercepted. Eighteen strategic bombers, including nine Tu-95MS aircraft from Olenya airbase in Murmansk Oblast were also believed to have been used in carrying out the attacks, while some of the missiles were believed to have been launched from Kursk Oblast. During the attack Kh-101s were seen deploying decoy flares.

The attack targeted cities across Ukraine, including Dnipro, Kharkiv, Konotop, Kyiv, Lviv, Odesa, and Zaporizhzhia, in what was possibly the largest aerial attack of the Russian invasion thus far. Ukrainian Air Force spokesperson Yurii Ihnat said that "we have never seen so many targets on our monitors at once." Ukrainian President Volodymyr Zelenskyy said the attacks destroyed or damaged over 100 private houses, along with 45 multi-story buildings, schools, two churches, hospitals, maternity wards, and numerous commercial and warehouse establishments.

The Economist reported that a source in Ukraine's defence industry indicated Russia had mainly targeted defence facilities, including those for missile and drone production, saying "The attacks had strategic meaning for the enemy, with the aim of reducing our capacity to strike ... It's a battle to see who can destroy more of the enemy's long-range weapons."

A spokesperson of the Russian Ministry of Defence said that "all the designated military targets have been hit". At the United Nations Security Council, Russian ambassador Vasily Nebenzya attributed Ukrainian casualties to Ukrainian air defenses.

=== By region ===
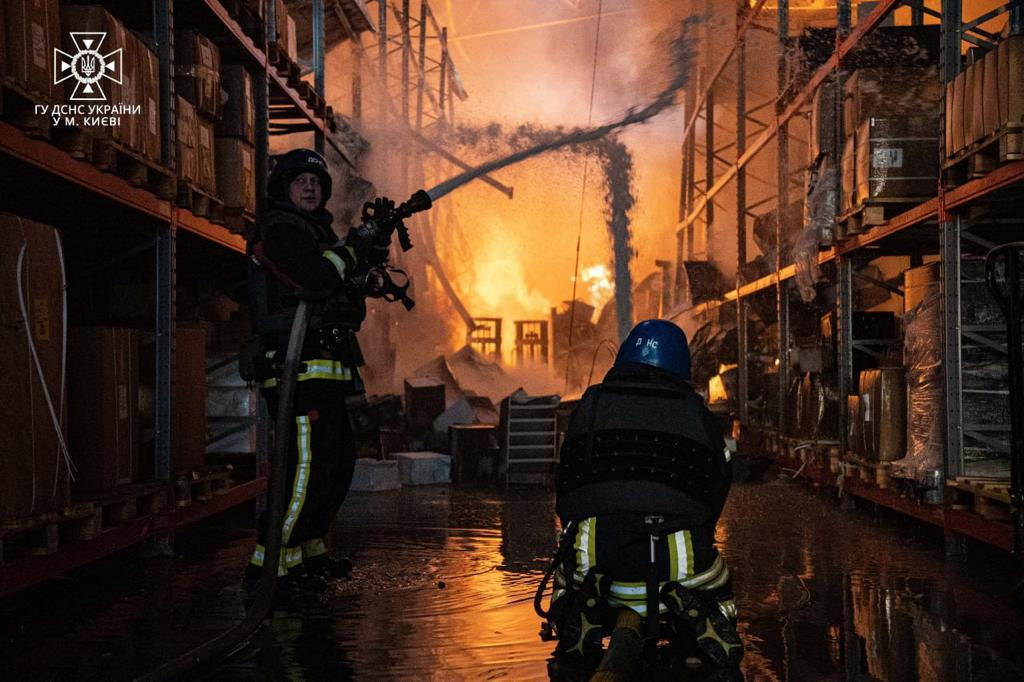
Burning warehouse in Kyiv

At least 33 people were reported to have died in Kyiv while at least 35 others were injured. At least ten people were trapped under a warehouse in the Podilskyi District. Several apartment buildings, warehouses, an office building and a house were also struck. The building of the Lukianivska station of the Kyiv Metro, which also serves as an air-raid shelter, was also damaged in an airstrike, but remained operational during the attack. The station lies across the street from a factory belonging to the Artem company, which produces missile components. There was no information on the factory's condition. In Boyarka, debris from an intercepted drone set fire to a house. At least 30 projectiles were shot down over the capital region.

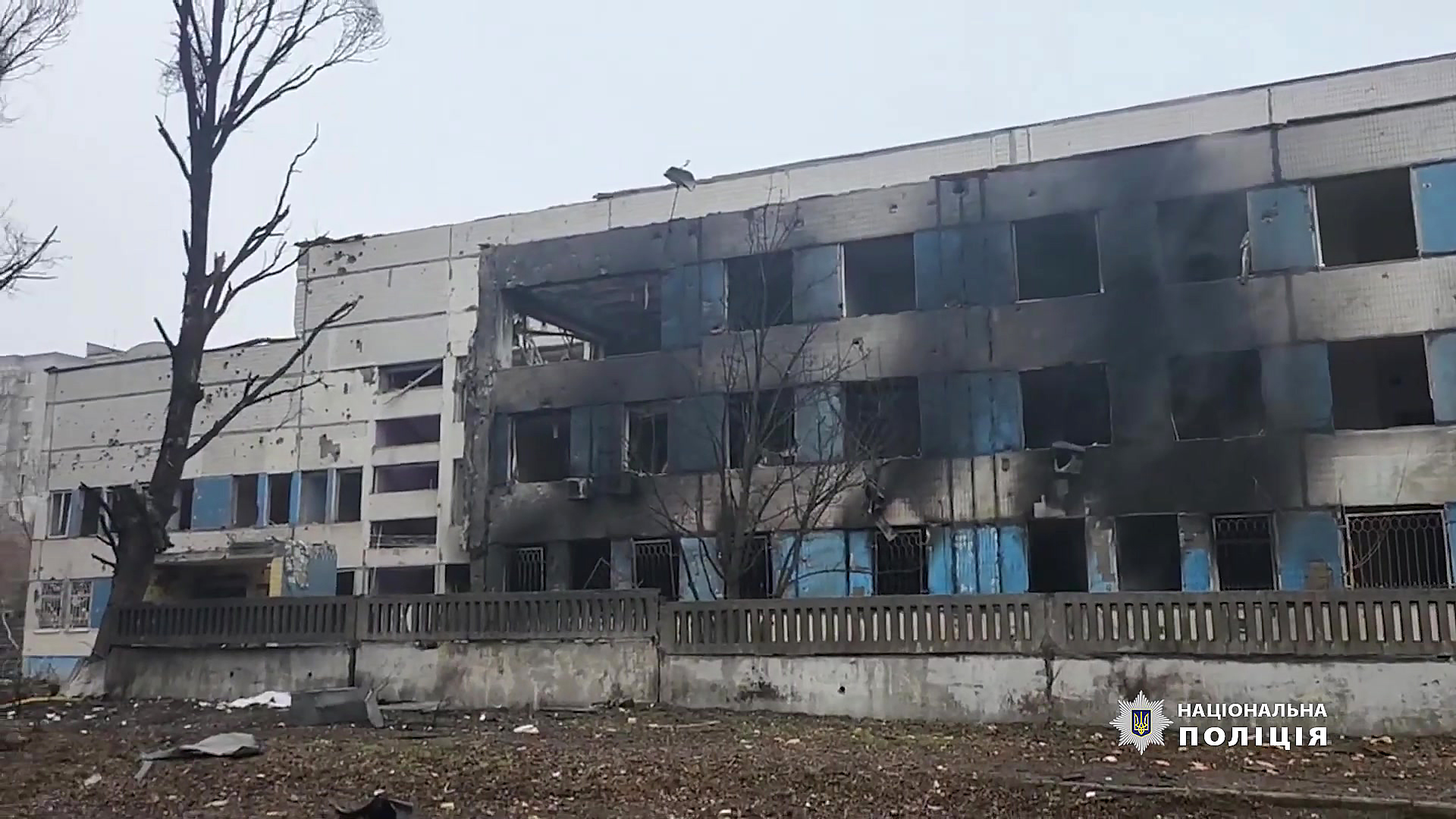
Destroyed maternity hospital in Dnipro

In Dnipro, a shopping center and a maternity hospital were attacked. Seven people, including a child and a police officer, died in the city while 30 others were injured. A house, eight administrative buildings and 24 high-rise buildings were also destroyed or damaged.

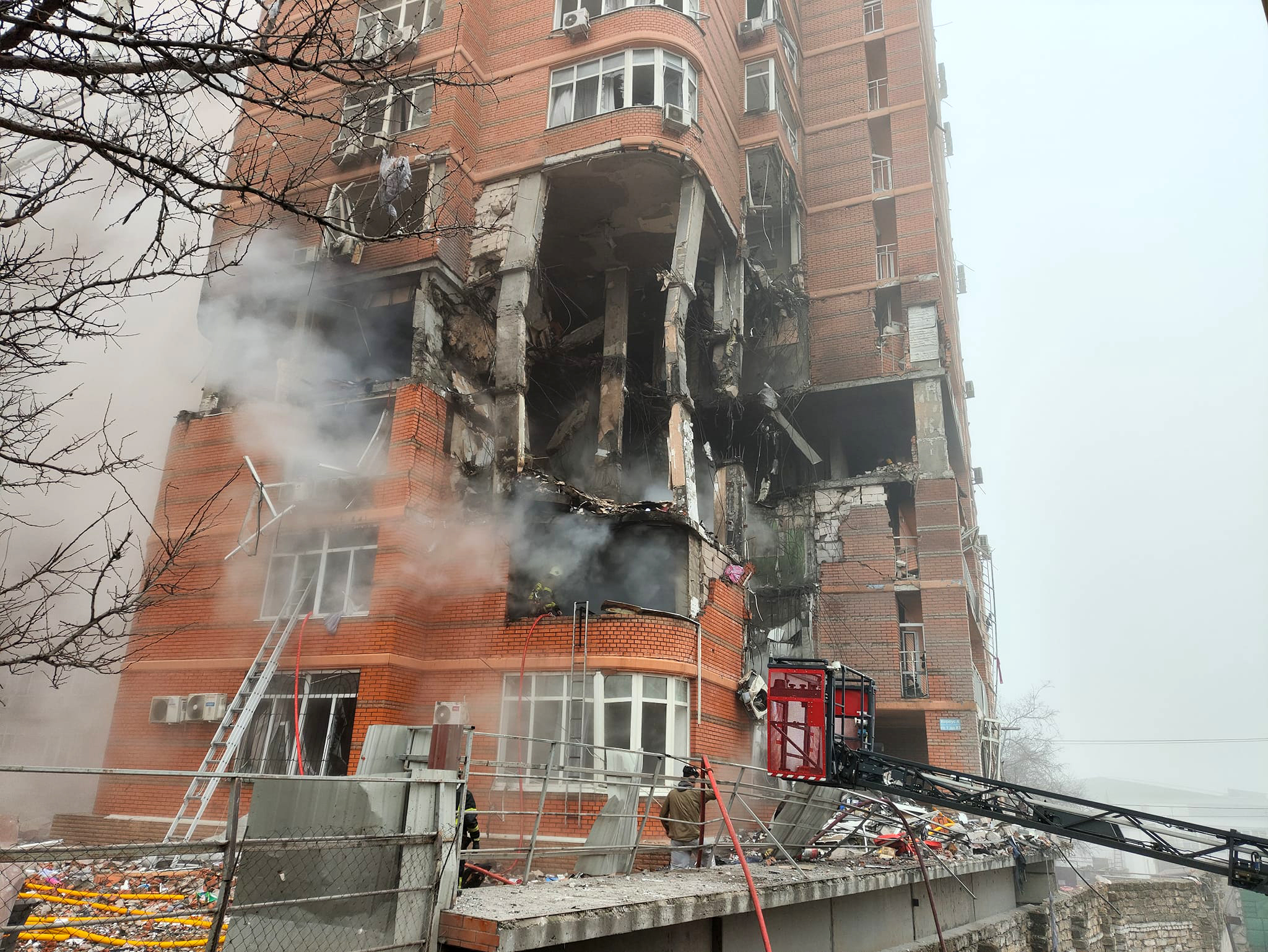
Damaged residential building in Odesa

In Odesa, falling drone debris caused a fire at a residential building, killing two people and injuring 15, including two children. A total of five people died in the city. while 27 others were injured. 21 residential buildings were also damaged.

In Lviv, one person was killed and 30 others were injured, while three schools and a kindergarten were damaged by drones. Thirteen residential buildings were also damaged. The fatality was later identified as basketball player Viktor Kobzystyi, who played for the national team in the 2001 and 2005 European Basketball Championships and coached several basketball teams including WBC Dynamo Kyiv.

In Kharkiv, three people were killed and 13 others were injured in three waves of missile attacks that damaged a warehouse, an industrial facility, a medical facility and a transport depot.

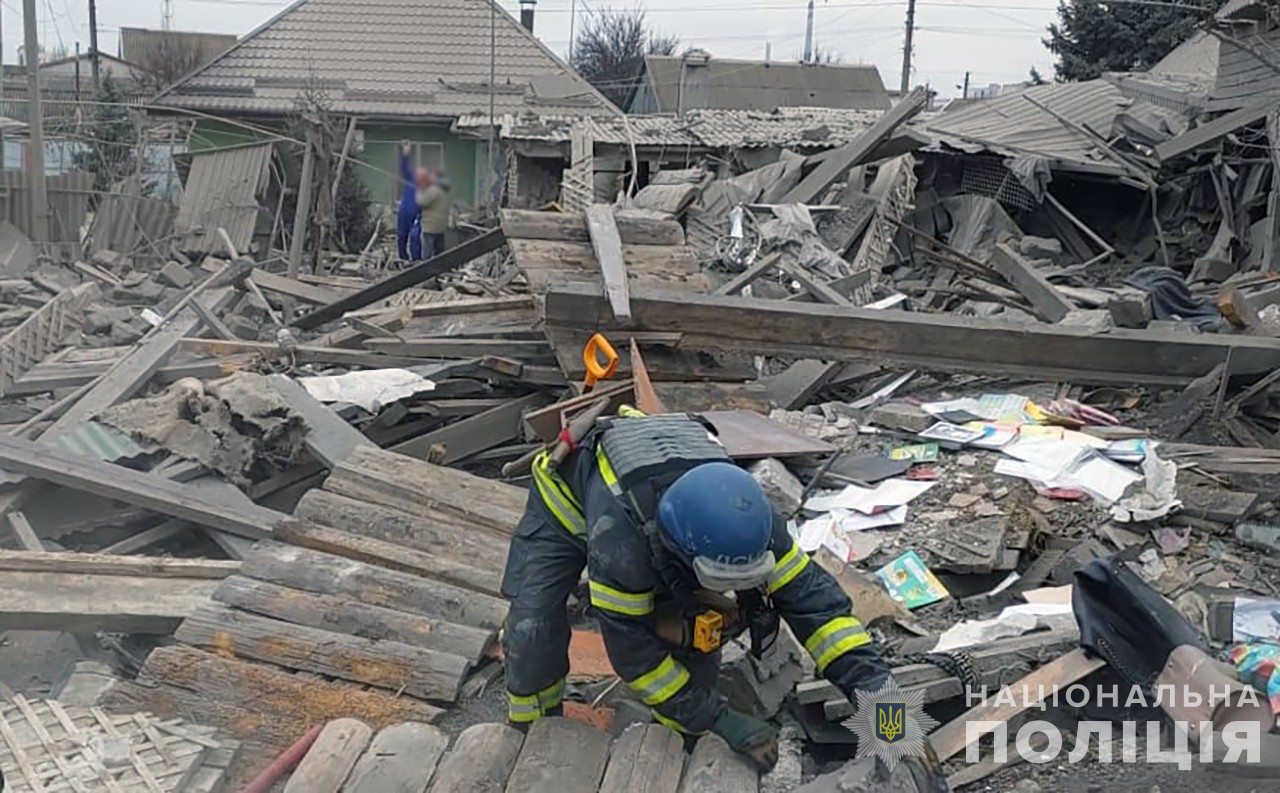
Destroyed houses in Zaporizhzhia

Nine people were killed in Zaporizhzhia while 13 others were injured. Several industrial facilities were targeted, while a house was destroyed and several multi-story buildings were damaged.

In Cherkasy Oblast, nine people, including a child were injured after a missile struck a residential area in Smila, damaging 51 houses. In Sumy Oblast, three people were injured while an apartment building and a vehicle service station were damaged after a missile struck Konotop.

=== Incursion into Poland ===
According to General Wiesław Kukuła, Chief of General Staff of the Polish Army and the Polish Army's Operational Command, one of the missiles entered Polish airspace from Ukraine near Zamość for approximately three minutes before it "turned back" for Ukrainian airspace, adding that it had travelled about 40 kilometers over the country. The governor of Lublin Voivodeship said that the projectile appeared on radars near Hrubieszów, which hosts a border crossing with Ukraine. Ordash later said that Russia would not provide an explanation over the incident until it received "concrete evidence" that the missile was theirs.

About 200 police officers were deployed to the area where the missile flew over to retrieve possible debris. while four Polish and American F-16 fighter jets, as well as an air tanker were scrambled from Polish airbases due to activities of long-range Russian aircraft. The Polish foreign ministry also summoned the Russian chargé d'affaires Andrei Ordash over the incident.

== Aftermath ==
In his address that evening, Zelenskyy praised the country's air defenses for their efforts to stop the attacks and pledged to strengthen them.

Days of mourning were declared in Zaporizhzhia, Dnipro, and Odesa for 30 December, while the mayor of Kyiv, Vitaly Klitschko, said that a day of mourning would be held in the city on 1 January 2024.

In response to the entry of the Russian missile, Polish prime minister Donald Tusk met with president Andrzej Duda and the country's defense and military leadership. Duda later said that there was "no threat at the moment" and nothing to suggest that "anything bad" could happen in relation to the incident. US National Security Advisor Jake Sullivan spoke with the head of the Polish National Security Bureau Jacek Siewiera, to express Washington's "solidarity with Poland".

An estimate by Ekonomichna Pravda put the cost of the Russian attack at $1.273 billion.

On 22 January 2025, the Security Service of Ukraine arrested a lawyer from Dnipro on suspicion of aiding airstrikes on the city.

== Reactions ==
Ukrainian foreign minister Dmytro Kuleba said that the attacks were a wake-up call for those debating on continuing support for the country.

At an emergency meeting of the United Nations Security Council, assistant secretary-general Mohammad Khiari called the attacks "appalling". UN Secretary-General António Guterres also said he condemned Russia's attacks "in the strongest terms" and called on them to end.

U.S. president Joe Biden said that the attacks highlighted the need to stop Russian president Vladimir Putin and urged the United States Congress to pass a proposed military aid package to Ukraine that had been stalled in the legislature. UK prime minister Rishi Sunak said that the attacks underscored Putin's aims to "eradicate freedom and democracy", and urged continued support for Ukraine "for as long as it takes". The UK government said it was sending 200 air defence missiles to protect civilians and infrastructure.

== Ukrainian missile interception claims and summary of damages ==
Region	City	Weapon	Intercepted/Total	Strikes, Killed/Wounded
Odesa Oblast	Odesa	(Iran) Shahed 136	27/36	Confirmed to have hit a high-rise building
Lviv Oblast	Lviv	(Iran) Shahed 136	27/36	Confirmed to have hit two critical infrastructure facilities
Ukraine		(Iran) Shahed 136	27/36	27 out of 36 drones shot down by air defense
Zaporizhzhia Oblast	Zaporizhzhia	5В55/48Н6/9M723	?/14	Strikes on industrial and residential buildings. Casualties: 7/13
Kharkiv Oblast	Kharkiv	5В55/48Н6/9M723	?/14	Strikes on industrial and residential buildings, medical facilities. Casualties: 3/13
Lviv Oblast	Lviv	(Russia) Kh-101/X-101/Kh-47M2 Kinzhal	87/108	Strikes in front of educational institutions and residential buildings. Casualties: 1/15
Kyiv		(Russia) Kh-101/X-101/Kh-47M2 Kinzhal	87/108	Rockets and rocket fragments confirmed to have fallen among residential buildings. Casualties: 32/30
Sumy Oblast	Konotop	(Russia) Kh-101/X-101/Kh-47M2 Kinzhal	87/108	Damaged premises of a service station and residential buildings. Casualties: 0/3
Odesa Oblast	Odesa	(Russia) Kh-101/X-101/Kh-47M2 Kinzhal	87/108	Confirmed to have hit a residential multi-story building and other buildings. Casualties: 2/25
Dnipropetrovsk Oblast	Dnipro	(Russia) Kh-101/X-101/Kh-47M2 Kinzhal	87/108	Strikes on a shopping center and maternity hospital. Casualties: 4/10+
Kharkiv Oblast	Kharkiv	(Soviet Union) Kh-22	87/108	Strike on a civilian building, simultaneously with shelling from S-300/S-400 missiles. Casualties: 3/13
Ukraine		(Soviet Union) Kh-59, Kh-31	87/108	87 X-101/X-555/X-55 missiles intercepted by Ukrainian air defense
Ukraine overall (excluding S-300 systems)			114/158	Casualties: 38/160
Claimed total interception rate:			81 %	

== See also ==
- 30 December 2023 Belgorod shelling
- 2 January 2024 Russian strikes on Ukraine
- 26 August 2024 Russian strikes on Ukraine
- Aerial warfare in the Russian invasion of Ukraine
- Attacks on civilians in the Russian invasion of Ukraine
- Bombing of Kharkiv (2022–present)
- Dnipro strikes (2022–present)
- Russian strikes against Ukrainian infrastructure (2022–present)
- Timeline of the Russian invasion of Ukraine (1 December 2023 – 31 March 2024)
