= Raids on the Tendra Spit =

Engagement in the Russo-Ukrainian war

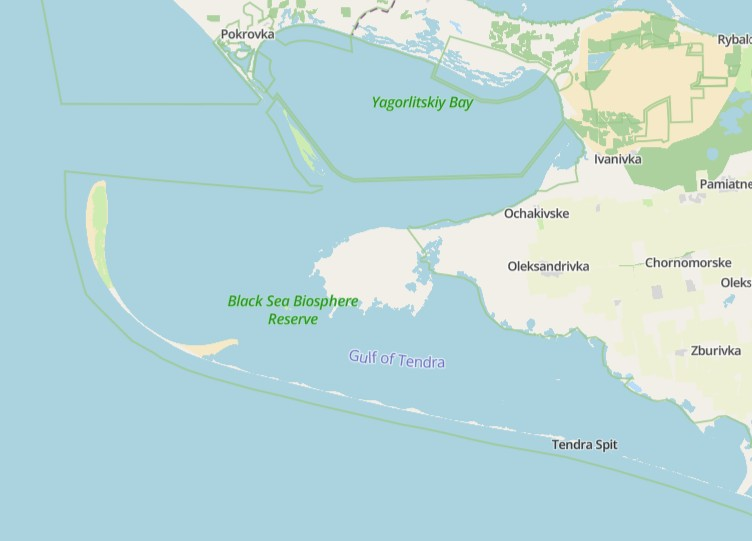
Map showing the location of the Tendra Spit (the thin, curved island on the left) off the Crimean coast

During the Russo-Ukrainian War, Ukraine has conducted raids on the Tendra Spit, which is occupied by Russia. The spit is a narrow island off the coast of Kherson Oblast, on the Black Sea. It is northwest of the Crimean Peninsula.

== February 2024 ==
A raid occurred over the night of 28 February and morning of 29 February 2024.

Five assault boats from the 73rd Naval Center of Maritime Special Operations were reported to have approached the beach and attempted to land. As they approached, the boats came under fire from Russian forces. One boat was reported to have escaped.

Russia claimed to have captured one Ukrainian and killed 20-25 others. The Ukrainian Defense Ministry acknowledged the deaths of four Ukrainians in the action. Russian sources posted photos to social media showing the bodies of six Ukrainians claimed to have been killed in the action.

== August 2024 ==
Ukraine's HUR military intelligence agency announced that it had conducted another raid on the Tendra Spit on 7 August 2024, reportedly destroying a Russian electronic warfare system and armoured vehicles, as well as inflicting casualties on Russian troops.

== September 2025 ==
On 3 September, the Ukrainian Navy claimed to have destroyed a Russian naval speedboat that was attempting to unload airborne soldiers at the spit, killing seven occupants and injuring four others.
