= Battle of Slavutych =

Battle in the Russian invasion of Ukraine

- Part of the northern front of the Russian invasion of Ukraine
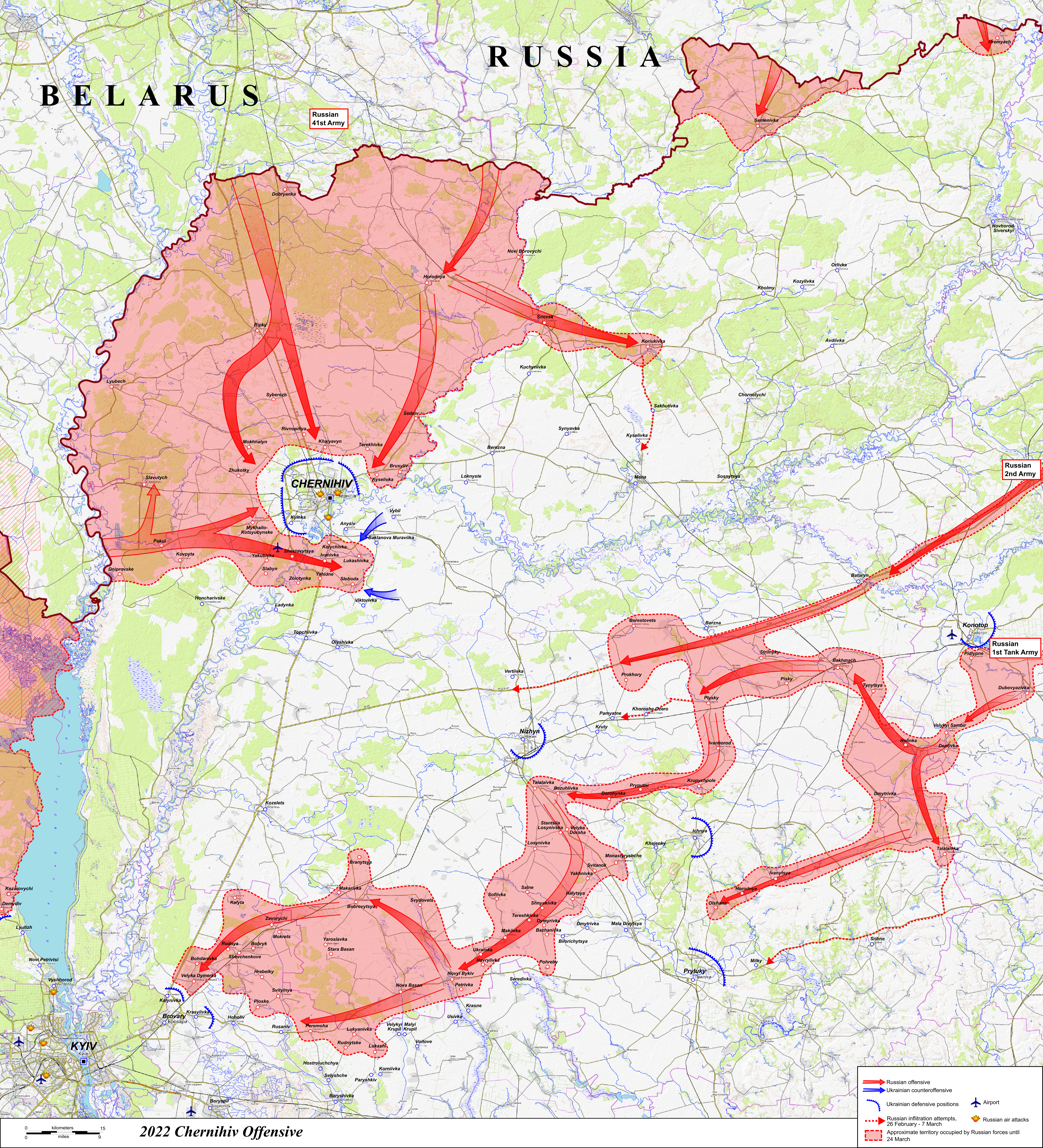
- Map of the 2022 Chernihiv offensive
Date	23–26 March 2022 (3 days)
Location	Slavutych, Kyiv Oblast, Ukraine 51°31′14″N 30°45′25″E

Belligerents
Russia	Ukraine

Casualties and losses
	4 Territorial Defense fighters killed
- 1 civilian wounded

The Battle of Slavutych was a military engagement that took place during the Russian invasion of Ukraine in the city of Slavutych, a purpose-built settlement for workers in the Chernobyl Exclusion Zone. The city came under attack by Russian forces in March 2022, forcing out Ukrainian defenders.

== Timeline ==
=== Initial siege and humanitarian crisis ===
Due to the siege of Chernihiv by Russian forces, the city of Slavutych was completely isolated from most of Ukraine by late February, leading to shortages of food and medicine. The city's electricity supply was disconnected; after Ukrenergo employees repaired damaged electricity lines to reconnect the city, Russian forces damaged them again.

Russian forces opened fire on a Ukrainian checkpoint near Slavutych on 23 March. Mayor Yuri Fomichev noted that the city was surrounded, and warned residents against trying to leave. He said that Russian forces had not advanced toward the city, but were nearby. The delivery of goods and humanitarian aid remained difficult. The following day, the shelling of Ukrainian checkpoints in Slavutych continued, with conditions within the besieged city described as a "humanitarian catastrophe." Energoatom warned that Russian forces were attempting to storm the city. On 25 March, the Slavutych city council forbade residents from moving around the city by foot or by vehicle, due to fears that they would be targeted by Russian snipers.

=== End of battle and Russian withdrawal ===
On 26 March, Russian armed forces entered Slavutych unopposed after driving Ukrainian Territorial Defense Force personnel away from the outlying checkpoints with artillery and direct tank fire. One Ukrainian fighter died at a checkpoint, and three more were killed by snipers while retreating. The city hospital was captured by Russian forces. Reports emerged that Russian troops had abducted the mayor of Slavutych, Yuriy Fomichev; he was ultimately released in time to address a protest rally against the Russian invasion, which took place later that day in the city square. More than 5,000 residents of the city took part in the peaceful protest, until it was disrupted by Russian troops firing warning shots and launching stun grenades into the crowd, injuring at least one civilian. Footage of protesters fleeing stun grenades circulated online internationally; the attack on a peaceful protest rally by civilians is a possible war crime.

In an address at the protest rally, the mayor of Slavutych assured Russian forces that there were no military forces or weapons within the city, telling them that they should withdraw as a result. Subsequently, Russian forces withdrew from the city centre into the city's outer suburbs.

The mayor of Slavutych agreed to allow Russian forces to search the city for weapons in order for them to agree to withdraw from the city. This process was completed on 27 March, and Russian troops exited Slavutych. Subsequently, humanitarian corridors were established in order to allow supplies and humanitarian aid to enter the city and give civilians the opportunity to evacuate.
