= Hroza =

Hroza (Ukrainian: Гроза) may refer to several localities in Ukraine:

- Hroza, Dnipropetrovsk Oblast
- Hroza, Kharkiv Oblast
  - Hroza missile attack

== See also ==
- Groza (disambiguation)
