= Kramatorsk missile attack =

Kramatorsk missile attack may refer to:

- February 2015 Kramatorsk rocket attack, 10 February 2015
- Kramatorsk railway station attack, 8 April 2022
- June 2023 Kramatorsk missile strike, 27 June 2023
- 2026 Kramatorsk bus massacre, 8 October 2026

== See also ==
- Kremenchuk shopping mall attack, 27 June 2022
