= 2026 Dnipro railway station massacre =

2026 Russian missile attack on Dnipro railway station

2026 Dnipro railway station massacre 2026 Dnipro train station attack
- Part of Russian attacks on civilians in the Russo-Ukrainian war (2022–present)
- Dnipro railway station

- Dnipro (Ukraine)
- Location: Dnipro, Ukraine
- Date: 29 October 2026; 11:00 (UTC+3)
- Attack type: One-way attack drone attack
- Deaths: 14
- Injuries: 14
- Perpetrator: Russia
- Motive: Anti-Ukrainian sentiment Russian irredentism

On 29 October 2026, at around 11:00 AM, Russian Armed Forces struck the Dnipro railway station with a turbojet-powered one-way attack drone, killing 14 civilians and wounding 14 more, including an 11-year old boy. It occurred in the Ukrainian city of Dnipro in the context of the Russo-Ukrainian War. Passengers were waiting at the train platform to board a train heading for Zaporizhzhia. A day of mourning was declared in Dnipro on 30 October. Six were seriously wounded, with shrapnel wounds. One of the victims had his both legs amputated.

Ukrainian Prime Minister Serhii Koretskyi condemned the attack on Telegram: "Russia is deliberately hunting civilians: on trains, at stations, in residential buildings... There is no justification for this terror, and there never can be". President of Ukraine Volodymyr Zelenskyy deplored the attack as "horrific". President of the European Commission Ursula von der Leyen said she was "heartbroken" by the "senseless and indiscriminate" Dnipro attack.

The attack occurred during Russia's increased efforts to capture all of Donbas in the Eastern Ukraine campaign. Kramatorsk and the neighboring Sloviansk were considered the "fortress belt" along the frontline, the last two big cities in northern Donetsk still under full Ukrainian control, as Russian forces have been trying to capture them for over a decade. According to Ukrainian Railways statistics, of the 521 Russian strikes against locomotives in the entire Russo-Ukrainian War since 2022, 60% occurred in 2026. In September 2026 alone, passengers were evacuated from more than 5,800 Ukrainian train services due to the threat of Russian attacks.

== See also ==
- Dnipro strikes
- 2026 Pryluky strike
- 2026 Kramatorsk bus massacre
- 2026 Komyshuvakha strike
- War crimes in the Russian invasion of Ukraine
- State terrorism
