= Groza =

Groza may refer to:

- Groza (surname), a Romanian surname
- Groza, Russia, a human settlement
- Groza, a tributary of the Uz in Bacău County, Romania
- OTs-14 Groza, Russian assault rifle
- MSP Groza silent pistol
- Groza, a Uragan-class guard ship of the Soviet Navy

== See also ==
- Hroza (disambiguation)
