= Grozăvești =

Grozăvești may refer to several places in Bucharest:

- Grozăvești, Bucharest, a district
- Grozăvești, a village in Corbii Mari Commune, Dâmbovița County
- Grozăvești, a village in Nicorești Commune, Galați County
- Grozăvești, a village in Hangu, Neamț Commune, Neamț County
- Grozăvești, a village in Drăghiceni Commune, Olt County
- Grozăvești Power Station, a large thermal power plant, having 2 generation groups of 50 MW each having a total electricity generation capacity of 100 MW
- Grozăvești metro station, a metro station

== See also ==
- Groza (surname)
- Grozești (disambiguation)
