= 2026 Kramatorsk bus massacre =

2026 Russian missile attack on Karamtorsk

Kramatorsk bus massacre 2026 Kramatorsk bus strike
- Part of Russian attacks on civilians in the Russo-Ukrainian war (2022–present)
- Aftermath of the attack

- Kramatorsk (Ukraine)
- Location: Kramatorsk, Ukraine
- Date: 8 October 2026; 10:00 am (UTC+3)
- Attack type: glide bomb attack
- Deaths: 33
- Injuries: 22
- Perpetrator: Russia
- Motive: Anti-Ukrainian sentiment Russian irredentism

On 8 October 2026, at around 10:00 am, a Russian glide bomb attack hit two civilian buses in the Ukrainian city of Kramatorsk during the Russo-Ukrainian War. The strike killed 33 civilians, while a further 22 were wounded. The bus was filled with civilians waiting at a bus station near a dental clinic on the Yuvileina Street. Following the attack, all public transport was briefly suspended in the city.

The attack occurred during Russia's increased efforts to capture all of Donbas in the Eastern Ukraine campaign. Kramatorsk and the neighboring Sloviansk were considered the "fortress belt" along the frontline, the last two big cities in northern Donetsk still under full Ukrainian control, as Russian forces have been trying to capture them for over a decade.

United Nations Human Rights Council Chief Volker Türk condemned the attack and repeated that "deliberate attacks on civilians could amount to war crimes". Regional governor Vadym Filashkin deplored the attack: "For them (the Russians), a bus with passengers is an attractive target precisely because one strike can kill as many people as possible".

== See also ==
- Attacks on civilians in the Russian invasion of Ukraine
- 2023 Kramatorsk restaurant missile strike
- 2026 Pryluky strike
- 2026 Dnipro railway station massacre
- 2026 Komyshuvakha strike
- War crimes in the Russian invasion of Ukraine
- State terrorism
