= Grozești =

Grozeşti may refer to:

- Grozești, Iași, a commune in Iaşi County, Romania
- Grozești, Mehedinți, a commune in Mehedinţi County, Romania
- Grozeşti, the former name of Oituz Commune, Bacău County, Romania
- Grozeşti, Nisporeni, a commune in Nisporeni district, Moldova

== See also ==
- Groza (surname)
- Grozăvești (disambiguation)
