= 2026 Komyshuvakha strike =

Russian missile attack in Ukraine

- Part of Southern Ukraine campaign
- The aftermath of the attack
- Type: Missile strike
- Location: Komyshuvakha, Ukraine; 47°43′10″N 35°31′29″E
- Date: 2 November 2026 c. 10 a.m.-11 a.m. (UTC+2)
- Executed by: Russia
- Casualties: 72 killed 4 missing and 5 injured
- Location within Ukraine

On 2 November 2026, a Russian airstrike hit a school in a double tap strike that was being used as a shelter and humanitarian aid distribution point in the rural settlement of Komyshuvakha during the Russian invasion of Ukraine. The strike has killed at least 72 so far, with four still missing. It is one of the single deadliest Russian strikes since the start of the invasion, and the attack was internationally condemned as a violation of humanitarian law.

The two week search and rescue operation for missing was completed on 16 November 2026.

== Background ==
=== Invasion of Ukraine ===
During the Russian invasion of Ukraine, which began on 24 February 2022, Russian forces entered Ukraine with the goal of assisting the separatist Donetsk People's Republic and Luhansk People's Republic in seizing the portions of Donetsk and Luhansk oblasts that were still controlled by the Ukrainian government in a "special military operation". As part of the operation, Russian forces entered and began occupying parts of Zaporizhzhia Oblast, and in September 2022, unilaterally annexed all of the oblast after a largely disputed referendum, despite not controlling all of the oblast. Since then, Russian forces have moved to closer to the oblast capital of Zaporizhzhia and by extension Komyshuvakha as part of the southern front.

=== Komyshuvakha ===
Komyshuvakha is a rural settlement located within Zaporizhzhia Raion. It is located about 30 km from Zaporizhzhia and is on an important highway that connects the positions of the Ukrainian Army, which uses it for traffic, supplies, and evacuation. Komyshuvakha is also located near the sectors of Orikhiv and Stepnohirsk on the front, which are both important cities to capture on the way to Zaporizhzhia. As such, is considered a frontline settlement, and as such has been constantly hit by KAB bombs and FPV drones, although according to locals, the shelling has ramped up since 2026. There were at least four prior strikes on the village before 2 November: one on 22 January, which killed one and injured ten, one on 15 June, which injured four, one in August, which destroyed residential buildings, and one on 28 October. This has led to an exodus of many local residents leaving and others also being evacuated. In June 2026, a mandatory evacuation of children took place, with all 11 children being evacuated, although mandatory evacuation of the adult population was not announced, and the head of the Zaporizhzhia Regional Military Administration, Mykhailo Semikin, encouraged others to leave. On 4 November, Semikin reported that only around 200 residents remained in the settlement of the pre-war estimate of 5,251 people.

=== Building and shelter ===
The original Komyshuvakha gymnasium "Dzherelo", which was destroyed in 2023. It was rebuilt by October 2025 as an underground school with a shelter, but its original purpose as a school ended due to evacuations. It was eventually used as a "point of invincibility" and as a humanitarian aid centre, before being completely destroyed again in November 2026.

The building that was hit was known as the Komyshuvakha gymnasium "Dzherelo". The original gymnasium was the main school in the village and was founded in either 1903, according to the village head, or 1959, according to the Komyshuvakha website, and renovated in 2021 under the "Great Construction" programme, and at that time had over 800 students studying there. It was struck by missiles on the night of 2 July 2023, with only one building of the original gymnasium surviving, which led to the old building being declared destroyed beyond restoration. After this, the students were moved to distance learning while plans were made to create a new building with a shelter. In the summer of 2024, the state budget allocated 111.4 million hryvnias for the construction of a shelter in Komyshuvakha, and in September 2024 a 529,000 hryvnias tender for the design of it was announced. Around that same time, Ivan Fedorov confirmed that the planned shelter would be in an underground school in the village, which drew some criticism, leading to a temporary pause in plans to construct it, which was also attributed to a rumoured Russian advance. The head of the village supported the construction of the combined shelter and school, saying that Komyshuvakha already had no certified shelter. However, in January 2025, collective appeals of 874 people from the council, parents, and teachers from the village led to the resumption of construction. Shortly after, another tender was announced, which LLC "Vivat Bud," owned by Volodymyr Tarasenko, won for 109,068,632.98 hryvnias, with the school's competition announced for the end of the year. "Vivat Bud" was already a subcontractor on other underground schools.

Construction began on 24 February 2025, and it was also confirmed that other pupils form the nearby villages of Yasna Poliana, Zarichne, and Novotavriiske would also attend with agreed upon bus routes, and that the school would also serve as a point of invincibility. The school officially opened on 17 October 2025, and was the 13th facility in the oblast to be a combined shelter and school, with a reported cost of 111 million hryvnias. The classrooms could be used and turned into shelters, with more than 300 students attending at the launch. In December 2025, it was announced that through financing from the European Union, additional works would be done. However, due to heavy shelling in 2026, the school eventually closed down, and by April 2026 there were no more students. The school was then converted to be for administrative services, after the village council building was destroyed, and humanitarian aid. Also, residents whose homes were destroyed were also allowed to stay there overnight. According to HUR MO, by the time of the strike the building was a "resilience centre" where civilians could come for aid every Monday.

== Attack ==
Video from the body camera of a policeman who died in the attack, which captures the moments before the double-tap second strike.

On the morning of 2 November 2026, at around 10 a.m., bread and humanitarian aid were being handed out to residents at the humanitarian centre. This was a routine operation, as since the school shut down and was converted into a humanitarian centre, deliveries and distribution were scheduled for every Monday. At the time, around 80 to 100 or more people were inside the centre, according to estimates. According to the HUR MO, two small aerial bombs - FAB-500s or KAB-500s, depending on the source - then hit the grounds of the centre. After the initial strike, police officers, rescuers, and other people began to come to the site, with rescuers urging people to go into the underground shelter within the centre. In released body camera, it is shown that at least one police officer went down into the shelter with other survivors and told them to get down, before the video went black after the Russians double tapped with at least nine FAB-3000 bombs. Although the centre and the shelter were designed to withstand some force, they were not able to withstand the shere pressure from multiple FAB-3000s combined with the FAB-500s initially, and the concrete structure began to collapse. This created a large fire underground, and a large crater began to form. A second wave of rescuers came immediately afterward, although the Russians continued to strike the village with drones overnight.

Ukraine's Main Directorate of Intelligence identified Fedor Zubakov as the officer who planned the attack, along with 6 pilots of the SU-34 planes that carried out the attack.

== Emergency response ==
Employees of the State Emergency Service of Ukraine (DSNS) searching for victims in the rubble on 2 November 2026.

Immediately after the first strike, officers and rescue workers arrived at the scene and were able to pull five people out alive and take one to the hospital before multiple of them were killed after the Russian forces double tapped during a second wave of attacks. After the second wave, more rescue units from the State Emergency Service of Ukraine (DSNS), the special State Mining Rescue Detachment, and a team with canine units came to survey the area and clear the rubble. The search dogs were then deployed and were able to find more than 30 body fragments by 4 November. The search and rescue units have worked around the clock, although the number of victims found decreased by the day. The work was hampered by heavy dust and smoke from the blast radius of the bombs and constant ongoing Russian strikes. During the initial rescue on the night of 2-3 November, multiple guide bombs hit the village, forcing the rescue workers to constantly leave to hide in shelters.

In order to identify how many people might have been in the building, the DSNS and police found data on the average number of people who were at the aid distributions on Mondays, and relatives in the village who were alive were encouraged to phone in if they could not reach somebody. Some of the bodies that have been found since have been so badly damaged that they are not able to be recognised, so it was confirmed that DNA profiling would also be used later. A team of volunteers also came from the front line in order to find carers for disabled people who might have been killed, while law enforcement immediately began investigations into classifying the strike as a war crime under Part 2 of Article 438 of the Criminal Code of Ukraine.

The two week search and rescue operation for missing was completed on 16 November 2026. According to Interior Minister Ivan Vygivskyi, the search and rescue site was shelled nine times, resulting in additional injuries of three police and rescue workers.

== Weapons used ==
An example of a FAB-3000 bomb being deployed from an SU-34 by Russian troops in July 2024. At the end of the video, the blast explosion from one is also shown.

The weapons used in the attack were either a KAB-500 or FAB-500 guided bomb in the first wave and then multiple FAB-3000 bombs in the second wave. The FAB-3000s in specific are only used very rarely by Russian forces, mainly to attack complex and underground structures.

The latter, the FAB-3000, is a high-explosive bomb that is designated as part of the super-heavy class, with a mass of about 3,000 kg, with an explosive power of 1.4 tonnes. It is a free-fall bomb, which Russian forces fit with a UMPK fit so that they can release it from aircraft at a distance, with the glide range being anywhere from 50-60 km to 70-80 km. However, DefPulse notes that Russian forces did not need a long distance, and that it could have been deployed not relatively far due to the village being near the front. Some sources say that an Su-34 was likely the carrier of the bombs, while others say that the Tu-22M3 were more likely to be in use. The specific variant thought to be used in the attack was a FAB-3000 M-54. The most well-known example of an FAB-3000 being used before was during the Siege of Mariupol in 2022, when they were used against Ukrainian soldiers who were in Azovstal in reinforced shelters; however, only six were used during the time at Azovstal.

== Victims ==
Casualties

Police officers:

- Mykola Balanda
- Dmitry Besedin
- Mykhailo Buzhenko
- Mikhail Romanov

State Emergency Service of Ukraine:

- Denys Konovalenko
- Oleksiy Suschevskyi

Medics:

- Oleksandr Zaryashchuk

Confirmed civilian victims:

- Iryna Fokina
- Tetiana Ivanivna
- Natalia Karapetyan
- Olha Tverdenko
- Artem Zhukov
- Daria Zhukova

As of 16 November 2026, there are a confirmed total of 72 dead, five wounded, and another 4 people still missing.

=== Fatalities ===
==== State employees ====
Among the confirmed dead are four police officers and two employees of the State Emergency Service of Ukraine (DSNS). The state listed the deaths of the police officers as: Mykhailo Buzhenko, Mykhola Balanda, Mikhail Romanov, and Dmitry Besedin. Buzhenko was a senior district police officer in the prevention sector of the police department No. 1 of the Zaporizhzhia district police department who had spent 21 years in the workforce. Balanda was a senior operative of the criminal police sector of police department No. 2 who had spent 23 years in the workforce. Both Romanov and Besedin were officers who had served over 10 years in the workforce. The state also listed the deaths of the DSNS servicepeople as Denys Konovalenko and Oleksiy Suschevskyi. Konovalenko was 44 and had spent 12 years in the civil protection service, had been awarded for the defense of Ukraine. He had a wife, and they had two children who were 18 and 19, respectively. Suschevskyi was also 44 and had joined the DSNS in 2013 after having served in fire and rescue units within Zaporizhzhia for more than 13 years, and was also awarded for the defense of Ukraine, and also received the Defender of the Motherland Medal. He had a wife, with whom he had two children, who were 12 and 8, respectively.

One responding military medic was also killed, Oleksandr Zaryashchuk, who was originally from Zhytomyr. Prior to the invasion, he worked as a teacher and paramedic and also wrote poetry, but in 2024, he signed a contract to be a medic and was deployed to Komyshuvakha because there was a shortage of qualified doctors in the village. He and his wife had children.

==== Civilians ====
At least 46 civilians were killed in the attack, with search and rescue operations ongoing as of the fifth day. The list of the names of civilian deaths has not been released.

=== Injuries, missing, and survivors ===
As of 16 November, there are a total of four missing, five wounded.

== Reactions ==
=== Domestic ===
The Ukrainian president, Volodymyr Zelenskyy, condemned the strike and said that there was very little reaction internationally, and said he was counting on a response to support Ukraine with air defenses. The Minister of Foreign Affairs of Ukraine, Andrii Sybiha, said that the attack was another barbaric and cynical Russian attack, and called for there to be no concessions to Russia, which continued to kill innocent people. Regionally, the Head of the Zaporizhzhia Regional Military Administration, Mykhailo Semikin, said that the oblast budget would cover all funeral costs for those killed in the attack, and give 20,000 hryvnias to anyone with moderate injuries and an additional 30,000 hryvnias for those with severe injuries. A maximum of 50,000 hryvnias would be given to each person, and he said the oblast would provide all necessary assistance. Further, a three-day period of mourning was declared for all of the oblast from 3-5 November.

=== International ===
- Latvia On Twitter, the Foreign Minister of Latvia, Baiba Braže, said that the country would convene an extraordinary meeting of the UN Security Council over a number of "horrific attacks on civilians in Ukraine", including the specified example of Komyshuvakha.
- Israel The Minister of Foreign Affairs of Israel in a statement said they were deeply saddened by the terrible news and condemned the attack, wishing a speedy recovery to those involved.
- Lithuania The Minister of Foreign Affairs of Lithuania summoned the representative of the Russian embassy in Lithuania due to a number of attacks, including the one in Komyshuvakha.

=== Organisations ===
- UN The UN Secretary-General, António Guterres, condemned the ongoing attacks and the record number of civilian casualties, including children.
- UN The UN Humanitarian Coordinator for Ukraine, Matthias Schmale, condemned the attack and said that the "very possibility of dying trying to get life-saving help or take shelter is terrifying", and said that civilians seeking help and rescuers should never be targeted.
- UN The Head of the United Nations Human Rights Monitoring Mission in Ukraine, Danielle Bell, said that the Russians had to have known the site was a humanitarian centre, and said it violated most of the fundamental principles of international humanitarian law.
- Council of Europe The Secretary General of the Council of Europe, Alain Berset, condemned the strike and called it a gross violation of international law.
- Council of Europe The Commissioner for Human Rights of the Councill of Europe, Michael O'Flaherty, strongly condemned the attack and called for increase support for Ukraine.

== See also ==
- September 2022 Zaporizhzhia civilian convoy attack
- October 2022 Zaporizhzhia residential building airstrike
- October 2023 Hroza missile attack
- 14 May 2026 Russian strikes on Ukraine
