= 2026 Pryluky strike =

2026 Russian missile attack in Ukraine

- Part of Northern Ukraine campaign
- The aftermath of the attack
- Type: Missile strike
- Location: Pryluky, Ukraine; 50°35′21″N 32°23′08″E
- Date: 7 October 2026
- Executed by: Russia
- Casualties: 22 killed 54 injured
- Location within Ukraine

On the morning of 7 October 2026, Russia struck one civilian residential building with a Kh-101 cruise missile in Pryluky, Ukraine, during the Russian invasion of Ukraine. A total of 22 people were killed in the building, including five children, and 54 others were injured. This occurred during a large morning strike across Ukraine, with a variety of missiles and Shahed drones being used across the attack.

== Background ==
=== Invasion of Ukraine and retreat from Chernihiv ===
During the Russian invasion of Ukraine, which began on 24 February 2022, Russian forces entered Ukraine with the reported goal of assisting the separatist Donetsk People's Republic and Luhansk People's Republic in seizing the portions of Donetsk and Luhansk oblasts that were still controlled by the Ukrainian government in a "special military operation". As part of the operation, Russian forces entered and began occupying parts of Chernihiv Oblast, however they eventually withdrew by late March to April 2022 in order to concentrate their forces in the east. Since then, Russian forces have occasionally continued to strike parts of the oblast, although they have mostly only targeted the oblast capital of Chernihiv. The deadliest of these post-withdrawal was the April 2024 Chernihiv missile strike, which killed 18.

=== Pryluky ===
Pryluky is a city within the southern part of Chernihiv Oblast and the seat of Pryluky Raion. During the initial phase of the Northern Ukraine campaign after the Russian invasion of Ukraine, skirmishes and a brief battle in the city occurred from late February to March 2022. The closest the Russians ever got was briefly managing to accumulate military equipment in Pryluky Raion by 4 March 2022, although they did not capture any settlements in the raion. According to Volodrymyr Chernov, the acting head of the Pryluky District Military Administration, Russian forces attempted several times to capture the seat of Pryluky, but were stopped by a strong Ukrainian resistance. After the Russians entirely withdrew from Chernihiv Oblast from late March to early April 2022, the city has been the site of some strikes since then. These include, but are not limited to: June 2022, when three missiles struck the city, causing a brief fire; April 2026, when they destroyed the city council building; and the deadliest of these, in May 2026, when a ballistic missile hit the centre of the city, killing two and injuring 21 more people.

== Attack ==
A destroyed section of an apartment that was hit during the attack.

Sometime in the early hours of 7 October, Russian forces launched a large, nationwide attack using around 70 missiles along with Shahed drones across Ukraine, striking 12 different oblasts. Around 117 drones were shot down by the Ukrainian Air Force, along with 39 cruise missiles and five ballistic missiles. The Russian Ministry of Defense responded soon after, saying they had struck key defensive industrial enterprises across Ukraine. Ukrainian president Volodymyr Zelenskyy had warned the night prior that per Ukrainian intelligence reports, a massive strike was being prepared by Russian forces.

Six of those cruise missiles from the morning were unable to be shot down, and made it about 150 km east of Kyiv to Pryluky. One of them then hit a five-story residential building, with the residents unable to be warned because they were still asleep. Early reporting stated that 30 flats of the residential building were completely destroyed, alongside two entrances to the place, trapping people inside. The others managed to damage another nearby residential building, an enterprise, vehicles, and the children's and youth creativity centre, cutting off the gas supply.

== Emergency response ==
A serviceman of the State Emergency Service of Ukraine (DSNS), Viacheslav Fesenko, carrying the body of a child who was killed during the attack.

Soon after the attack, members of the National Police of Ukraine and the State Emergency Service of Ukraine (DSNS) began search and rescue operations. More than 500 personnel took part in the searches, with additional units being brought in from neighbouring areas. Specialised heavy machinery was also brought in to remove unstable structures and sift through the rubble. During the initial search, 12 were rescued from the rubble, although this increased to 15 by the evening hours of 7 October. DSNS psychologists were also being brought in to assist people who had survived. Zelenskyy confirmed the end of search operations on 8 October 2026.

== Weapon used ==
The cruise missile that was confirmed to have hit the apartment building was a Kh-101. Kh-101s have been used extensively since the Russian invasion, after having previously been seen in the Syrian civil war as part of the Russian intervention in the Syrian civil war.

== Victims ==
=== Fatalities ===
By the morning of 8 October, the day the search operations ended, the DSNS confirmed that 22 people had died, of which five of those were children. Of the five children, four died at the residential building, while one died in the hospital. Zelenskyy named four of the children the day prior: Oleksandr (1), Kyrylo (1), Serhii (1), and Maksym (8). Among the other notable deaths that were released was a family of three generations: the grandmother, Viktoriia, her daughter, Kateryna, and one of Kateryna's children, Sashka. They lived on the fifth floor of the residential building. One police veteran who was 47 at the time, Oleh Malysh, was also reported as dead. He had recently returned from the front as part of a rifle battalion of the police from the Chernihiv Oblast. The mother of Oleh's wife was also reported as having been killed in the strike.

=== Injuries ===
Another 54 people were reported as having been injured, with 15 being rescued from the rubble of the residential building.

== Reactions ==
=== Domestic ===
Soon after the attack, Ukrainian President Zelenskyy claimed that it was a present to Russian President Vladimir Putin, as the attack occurred directly on Putin's birthday. The following day, Zelenskyy, together with the visiting Foreign Secretary of the U.K., Ed Miliband, visited Pryluky. During the visit, they spoke with residents, paid tribute, and visited the local hospital. During this speech, Zelenskyy thanked the rescuers and asked for more support for Ukraine in the light of such attacks, like increasing sanctions on Russia.

=== Russia ===
In response to the strike, the Ministry of Defense of Russia said that the intended target was the "Plastics-Pryluky" ("Пластмас-Прилуки") plant. They claimed that the plant had been producing components for the Ukrainian cruise missile FP-5 Flamingo, and that some of the Flamingos components were also stored there. Russian media specifically claimed that the plant listed the Luch State Design Bureau, a missile developer, as one of its customers, and that the plant was listed as an enterprise of strategic importance for the economy and security of Ukraine as other justifications for the attack. They also deflected blame and said that it was not the missile intended for the plant that had hit the residential building, but that the strike on the building was the result of a failed Ukrainian air defense.

=== International ===
- France The spokesperson for the Ministry for Europe and Foreign Affairs said that France condemned the attacks against civilians and infrastructure and described the attacks on Kramatorsk and Pryluky as "barbaric".
- United States A spokesman for the White House said that U.S. President Donald Trump wanted the war to be resolved so that senseless killings stopped.
- Lithuania The Foreign Minister, Kęstutis Budrys, wrote on X that criminals in the Kremlin had given a birthday present to Putin in the form of a massive attack on Ukraine and called Russia a terrorist state.
- European Union The EU Ambassador to Ukraine, Kateryna Martenova, appealed to Putin and asked if this was what he wanted on his birthday.

=== Organisations ===
- United Nations The UN Humanitarian Coordinator for Ukraine, Matthias Schmale, called for an end to attacks against civilians.

== See also ==
- 14 May 2026 Russian strikes on Ukraine
- 2026 Komyshuvakha strike
- 2025 Sumy airstrike
- 3 March 2022 Chernihiv bombing
- 16 March 2022 Chernihiv breadline attack
