= Hroza missile attack =

2023 Russian airstrike in Ukraine

- Part of the attacks on civilians in the Russian invasion of Ukraine
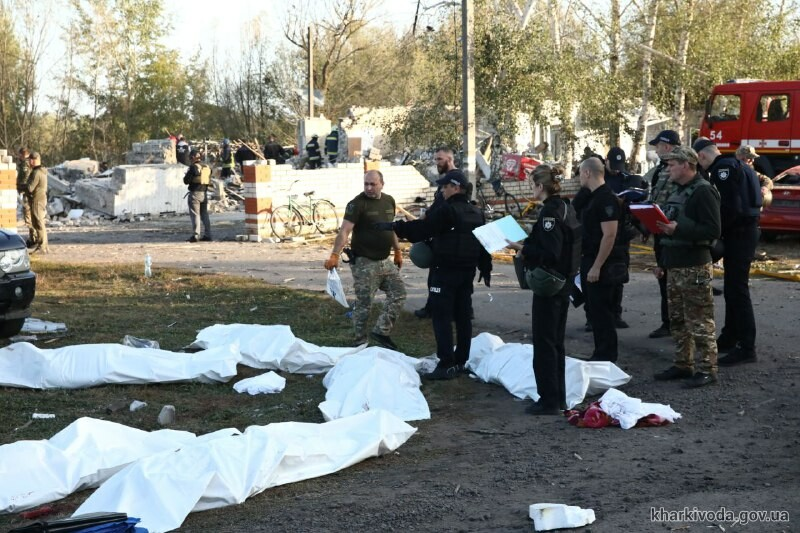
- Hroza after the missile strike
- Location: 49°40′23″N 37°12′30″E; Hroza, Kharkiv Oblast, Ukraine
- Date: 5 October 2023; 1:15 p.m. (UTC+02:00)
- Target: Ukrainian civilians
- Attack type: Missile strike
- Deaths: 59
- Injuries: 7
- Perpetrator: Russia
- Motive: Attack on a memorial service of a Ukrainian soldier which Russia believed would attract his colleagues

On 5 October 2023, the Russian Armed Forces launched an Iskander ballistic missile at residents gathered in a memorial service at a shop and cafe in Hroza, Kupiansk Raion, Kharkiv Oblast, Ukraine, killing 59 and injuring at least 7 others. Among those killed in the airstrike was a six-year-old boy. The attack took place as part of the Russian invasion of Ukraine.

== Background ==
The memorial service was for a Ukrainian soldier who was killed in action. Local prosecutor Dmytro Chubenko said that the soldier's widow, son, who was also a soldier, and daughter-in-law were among those killed in the attack.

According to the Ukrainian minister of internal affairs, Ihor Klymenko, Hroza had a population of 330 people prior to the attack. Hroza was captured by Russian forces early in the invasion, and liberated by Ukraine during the Kharkiv counteroffensive, in September 2022. The governor of Kharkiv, Oleh Synyehubov, confirmed that all those killed were residents of Hroza, and that this airstrike killed 10% of the village's pre-war population (about 501 in 2020).

== Reactions ==
Ukrainian president Volodymyr Zelenskyy called the attack "a completely deliberate act of terrorism" and accused Russia of "genocidal aggression." He also said that the attack "couldn't even be called a beastly act - because it would be an insult to beasts," and "Who could launch a missile at them? Who? Only absolute evil." In response to the attack, Zelenskyy criticized countries supporting Russia, saying "all those who help Russia circumvent sanctions are criminals."

Kharkiv governor Oleh Synyehubov described the attack as one of the region's "bloodiest crimes." UN Humanitarian Coordinator Denise Brown said; "Our thoughts are also with the people of Ukraine, who had to witness today, once again, another barbaric consequence of Russia’s invasion... Attacks against civilians and civilian infrastructure are prohibited under international humanitarian law and they must stop immediately".

Press secretary for Russian president Vladimir Putin Dmitry Peskov denied that Russia was responsible for the attack in Hroza and repeated that the Russian military does not target civilian facilities. In his speech to the UN Security Council on 9 October 2023 Permanent Representative of Russia to the United Nations Vasily Nebenzya said that the attack had happened precisely at the moment when president Zelenskyy visited a EU summit in Spain. Nebenzya also stated at the Council that "at the time of the strike, the funeral of one of the high-ranking Ukrainian nationalists was taking place there. Of course, many of his neo-Nazi accomplices took part in it."

== Investigation ==
On 11 October 2023 Ukraine's SBU announced that it established the identities of two men who provided the exact timing of memorial service in Hroza to the Russians. These were Vladimir and Dmitry Mamon, who began collaborating with Russians during the region's occupation and on liberation fled to Russia, but continued to maintain social networks in the village. Messages acquired by SBU indicate the brothers did realize there would be civilians at the service and Russians "probably won't send gifts" (missiles), yet they still indicated the meeting as a target because they hoped the deceased soldier's comrades would be also present. The prosecutor's office also increased the number of killed to 55 after remains of two women earlier unaccounted for were identified in the rubble, while 3 people are still unaccounted for.

On 31 October 2023 UN OHCHR published findings of its investigation, concluding that all victims of the strike, 36 women, 22 men and one child, were civilians. UN stated that Russia either failed to verify intelligence about the presence of soldiers at the service, or deliberately targeted civilians, and urged Russia to acknowledge responsibility, to conduct an investigation to hold those responsible to account and prevent other such attacks, and to provide reparations for direct and indirect victims.

On 12 February 2024, a former Ukrainian police officer was charged in absentia for allegedly helping Russia strike Hroza.

== See also ==
- Russian war crimes
- August 2023 Chernihiv missile strike
- July 2023 Lyman cluster bombing
- July 2023 Kramatorsk restaurant missile strike
- November 2026 Komyshuvakha strike
- Sanaa funeral airstrike – 2016 airstrike in Yemen
