= Dnipro railway station =

Railway station in Dnipro, Ukraine

Coordinates: 48.4772°N 35.0150°E

Dnipro–Holovnyi Дніпро–Головний
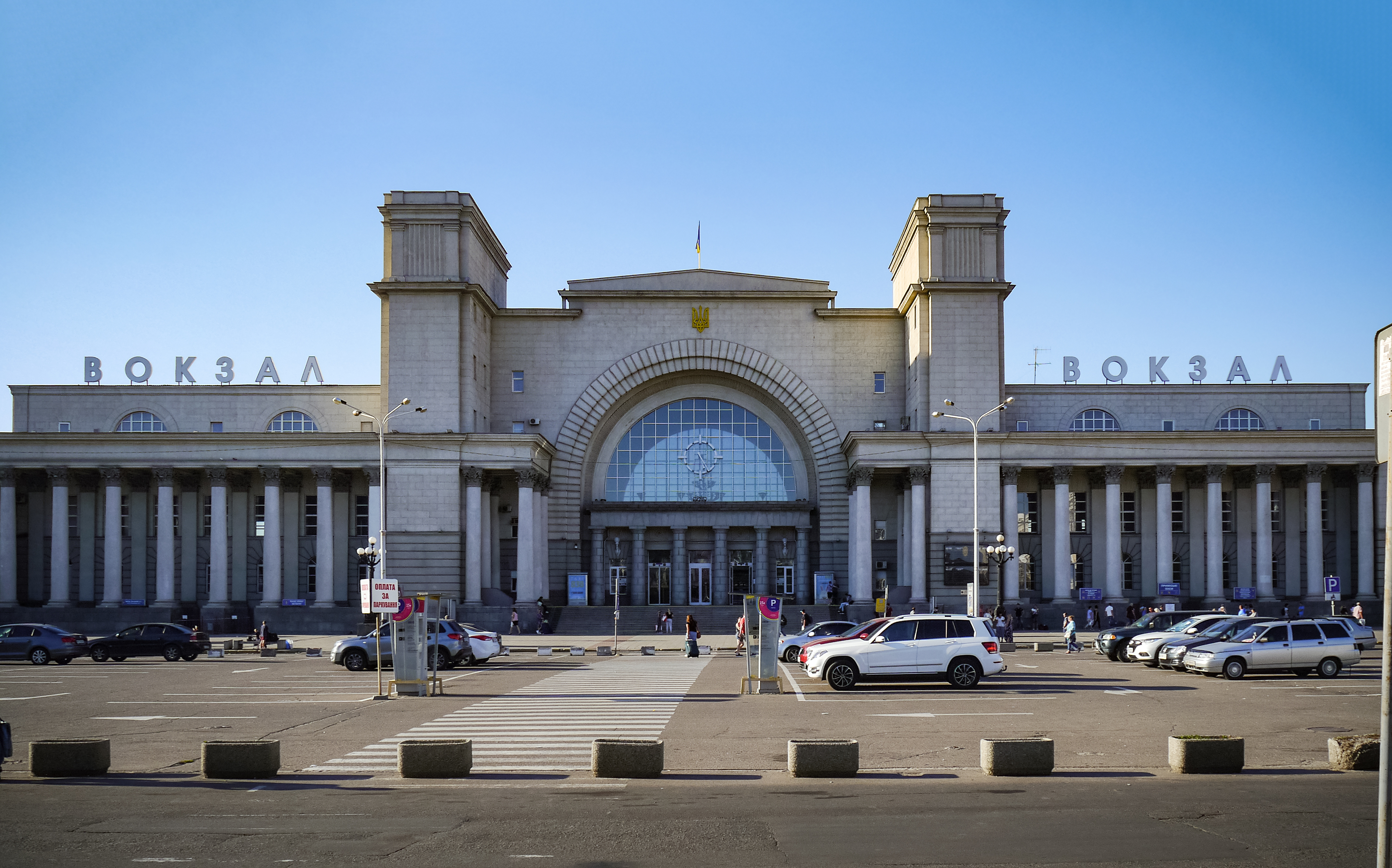

General information
- Location: Ukraine, Dnipro
- System: Prydnipro Railways terminal
- Owner: Ukrainian Railways (Prydnipro Railways)
- Platforms: 12
- Tracks: 24

Construction
- Parking: Yes

Other information
- Station code: 45100

History
- Opened: 1884
- Former names: Yekaterinoslav (1884-1926)

Services
Preceding station	Ukrainian Railways	Following station
Horyainove toward Verkhivtseve	Dnipro–Verkhivtseve	Terminus
Terminus	Dnipro–Synelnykove	Amur toward Synelnykove
Location

Dnipro–Holovnyi (Ukrainian: Дніпро–Головний) is the main railway station of Dnipro, Dnipropetrovsk Oblast, Ukraine.

== History ==
The station was opened in 1884, called Ekaterinoslav.

July 20, 1926, the Presidium of the USSR Central Executive Committee of the city and station Ekaterinoslav was renamed to Dnipropetrovsk.

During the Holodomor, British journalist Gareth Jones noted that it was filled with starving peasants desperate for food.

During World War II the building was destroyed and in its place under the project of architect Alexey Dushkin in 1951 and built a new station building.

In 1976 a large monumental statue of Grigoriy Petrovsky, after whom the city was renamed in 1926, was erected on the square in front of the railway station. This statue was destroyed by an angry mob on 29 January 2016.

On 19 May 2016 the official name of Dnipropetrovsk was changed to Dnipro. Hence the official name of the station was changed to Dnipro-Holovnyi.

The station was damaged during one of the Russian strikes on Dnipro during the Russo-Ukrainian war. On 18 November 2025 some windows at the railway station were blown out and two trains were delayed for about two and a half hours. On 29 October 2026, a Russian one-way attack drone struck a crowded platform of the station, killing 14 civilians and wounding 14 more.

== Trains ==
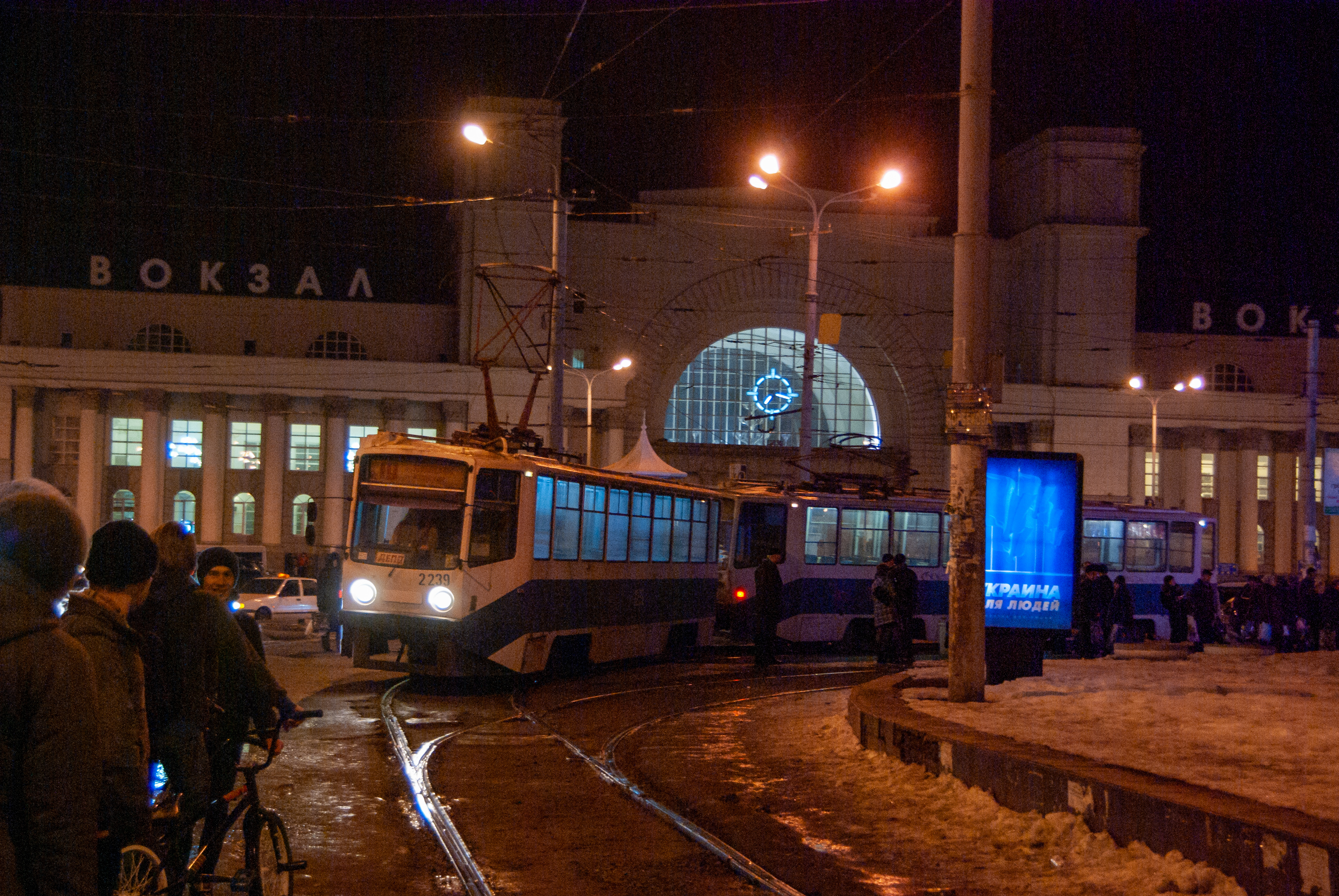
Dnipro-Holovnyi at night

Since the Russian invasion of Ukraine Dnipro city became an important logistic point for refugees and army

As of April 2023, the routes served from Dnipro are:

- Dnipro — Odesa
- Dnipro — Kyiv
- Dnipro — Pokrovsk
- Dnipro — Lviv
- Dnipro — Truskavets

With additional services calling at Dnipro between:

- Yasinia — Zaporizhzhia
- Kharkiv — Odesa
- Kharkiv — Uman
- Kovel — Zaporizhzhia
- Kramatorsk — Odesa
- Kyiv — Zaporizhzhia
- Lviv — Pokrovsk
- Przemyśl (Poland) — Zaporizhzhia
