= Groza, Russia =

Rural settlement in Bryansk Oblast, Russia

Groza (Russian: Гроза) is a rural-type settlement in Klintsovsky District, Bryansk Oblast, Russia.

It was first mentioned in the 1920s.

In 1926, it had a population of 40. By 2002, that had dropped to 1 person, who was ethnically Russian.
