= Hroza, Dnipropetrovsk Oblast =

Coordinates: 48°09′27″N 35°04′45″E

Hroza (Ukrainian: Гро́за) is a settlement in Ukraine, located in Dnipro Raion, Dnipropetrovsk Oblast. Its population was 43 as of 2021.

== Demographics ==
According to the 2001 Ukrainian census, 93.6% of the village population spoke Ukrainian, and 6.4% spoke Russian.
