= Zaporizhzhia civilian convoy attack =

Airstrike during the Russian invasion of Ukraine

- Part of Attacks on civilians in the Russian invasion of Ukraine
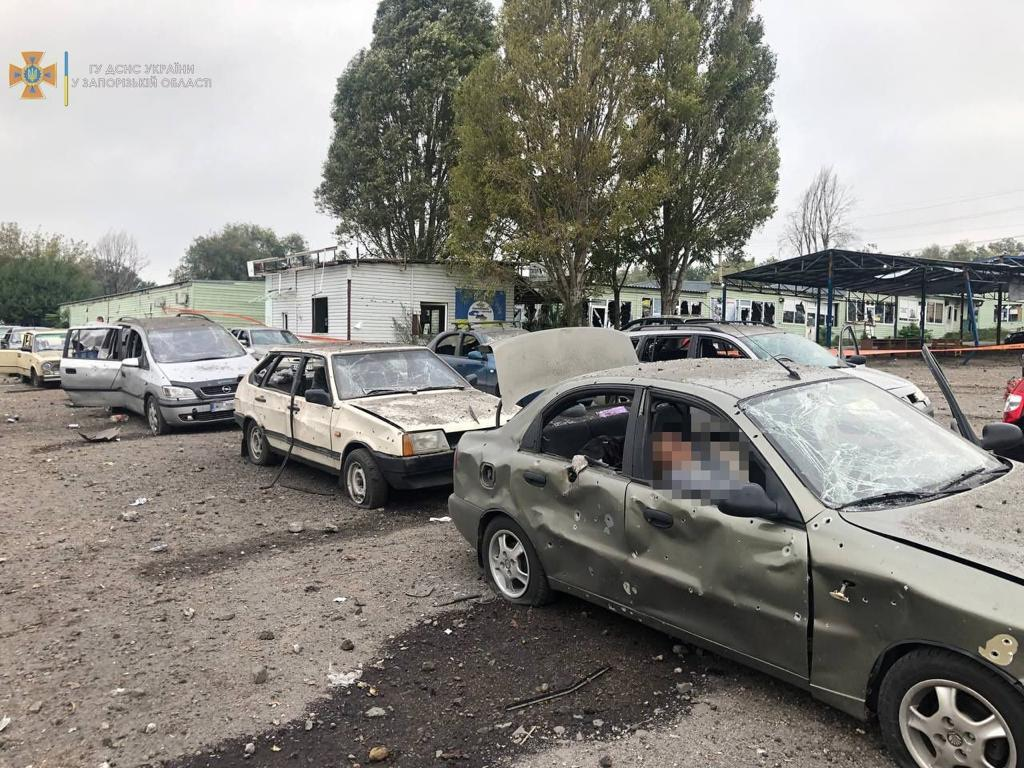
- Damaged vehicles after the attack
- Location: Zaporizhzhia, Ukraine
- Date: 30 September 2022
- Attack type: Missile strike
- Deaths: 32
- Injuries: ~88
- Perpetrator: Russian Armed Forces

On 30 September 2022, the Russian Armed Forces reportedly launched sixteen S-300 missiles at a civilian convoy in the outskirts of Zaporizhzhia, during the Russian invasion of Ukraine. 32 people were killed (both adults and children) and 86 more were injured.

Four of the missiles hit an area next to an automotive market on the southeast of Zaporizhzia, where a humanitarian convoy of around 60 cars was forming before going to the Russian checkpoint at Vasylivka in order to pick up their relatives.

The attack occurred hours before Russia formally annexed four regions of Ukraine, including Zaporizhzhia Oblast.

== Reaction ==
Vice-President of the European Commission Josep Borrell condemned the attack, tweeting, "Another heinous attack by Russia on civilians: this time a humanitarian convoy bringing vital help to people living in the non-government controlled areas of Zaporizhzhia."

Ukrainian President Volodymyr Zelenskyy commented on the attack by calling Russia a "state-terrorist". The Zaporizhzhia regional prosecutor's office opened a criminal case on the violation of the laws and customs of war. The Ukrainian authorities of the Zaporizhzhia region declared 1 October a day of mourning.

== Reaction ==
As a result of the attack, travel to the temporarily occupied territory has been suspended indefinitely. 1 October 2022 has been declared a day of mourning in the Zaporizhzhia region for those killed. The Zaporizhzhia Regional Prosecutor’s Office has launched criminal proceedings on charges of violating the laws and customs of war and of intentional homicide. The President of Ukraine, Zelenskyy, stated:

A terrorist state is firing missiles at the civilian population in Zaporizhzhia, Mykolaiv and Dnipropetrovsk regions. It is striking Ukrainian regions with multiple launch rocket systems and drones. In Zaporizhzhia and the surrounding area alone, the occupiers fired 16 missiles in a single morning! Only complete terrorists, who have no place in a civilised world, could act in this way. The enemy is raging and trying to take revenge for our resilience and their own failures. It is cynically destroying peaceful Ukrainians, having long since lost all humanity. Bloodthirsty scum! You will be held to account without fail. For every Ukrainian life lost!

— President of Ukraine Volodymyr Zelenskyy

At the same time, the Russian authorities claimed to have struck a ‘strategic target’.

EU representative Josep Borrell expressed his condolences and stated that the EU condemns the Russian attack on civilians and that those responsible for the attack will be brought to justice.

According to the UK Ministry of Defence, Russia’s use of a missile from an air defence system to strike a ground target may indicate that it lacks high-precision long-range missiles.

== See also ==
- 2022 Zaporizhzhia residential building airstrike
