= 2022 Zaporizhzhia residential building airstrike =

Airstrike during the Russian invasion of Ukraine

Zaporizhzhia residential building airstrike
- Part of Attacks on civilians in the Russian invasion of Ukraine
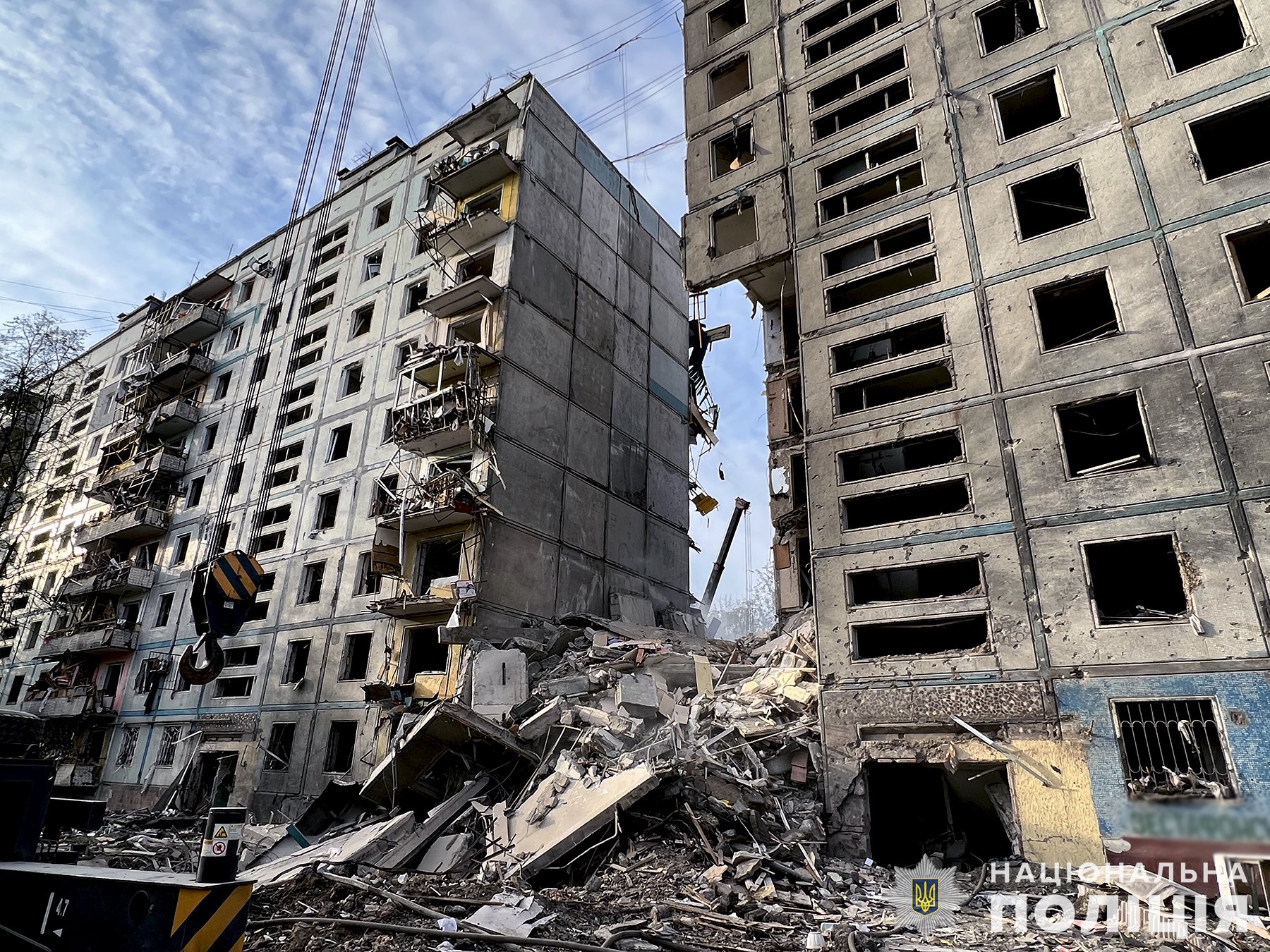
- A residential building in Zaporizhzhia following the airstrike
- Location: Zaporizhzhia, Ukraine
- Date: 9 October 2022; 3 a.m. Eastern European Summer Time (UTC+3:00)
- Attack type: Missile strike
- Deaths: 13
- Injuries: 89
- Perpetrator: Russian Armed Forces

The Zaporizhzhia residential building airstrike occurred in the early morning of 9 October 2022. The missile attack by the Russian Armed Forces, killed at least 13 people and injured more than 89 others.

The airstrike, like others in Kyiv, Lviv, Dnipro, Mykolaiv and Zhytomyr, took place the day after an explosion damaged large parts of the Crimean Bridge, which Russian president Vladimir Putin accused Ukraine of carrying out, and called it an "act of terrorism."

== Background ==
During the Russian invasion of Ukraine, Russian authorities and the Russian Armed Forces have repeatedly attacked civilians. In the Zaporizhzhia Oblast, an attack on a civilian convoy on 30 September killed 32 people and injured nearly 90 others. The attack preceded the annexation of the region.

A few days before the airstrike, on 6 October at least 17 people including a child died when seven Russian missiles struck Zaporizhzhia, three of them reaching the residential center of the town.

On 8 October, an explosion caused major damage to the Crimean Bridge, a key supply route for the Russian Armed Forces to enter occupied Crimea.

== Airstrike ==
Six missiles were launched at a residential area in Zaporizhzhia, destroying an apartment building and damaging 70 other buildings. The attack resulted in the deaths of 13 people, including a child. Another 89 were injured, 11 of whom were children. The missiles reportedly originated from Russian-controlled locations in Zaporizhzhia.

== See also ==
- 10 October 2022 missile strikes on Ukraine, another retaliatory attack for the Crimea Bridge explosion
- Attacks on civilians in the 2022 Russian invasion of Ukraine
- War crimes in the 2022 Russian invasion of Ukraine
- Zaporizhzhia civilian convoy attack
- 2023 Dnipro residential building airstrike
