= Kramatorsk railway station attack =

2022 Russian missile attack in Ukraine

- Part of Eastern Ukraine campaign
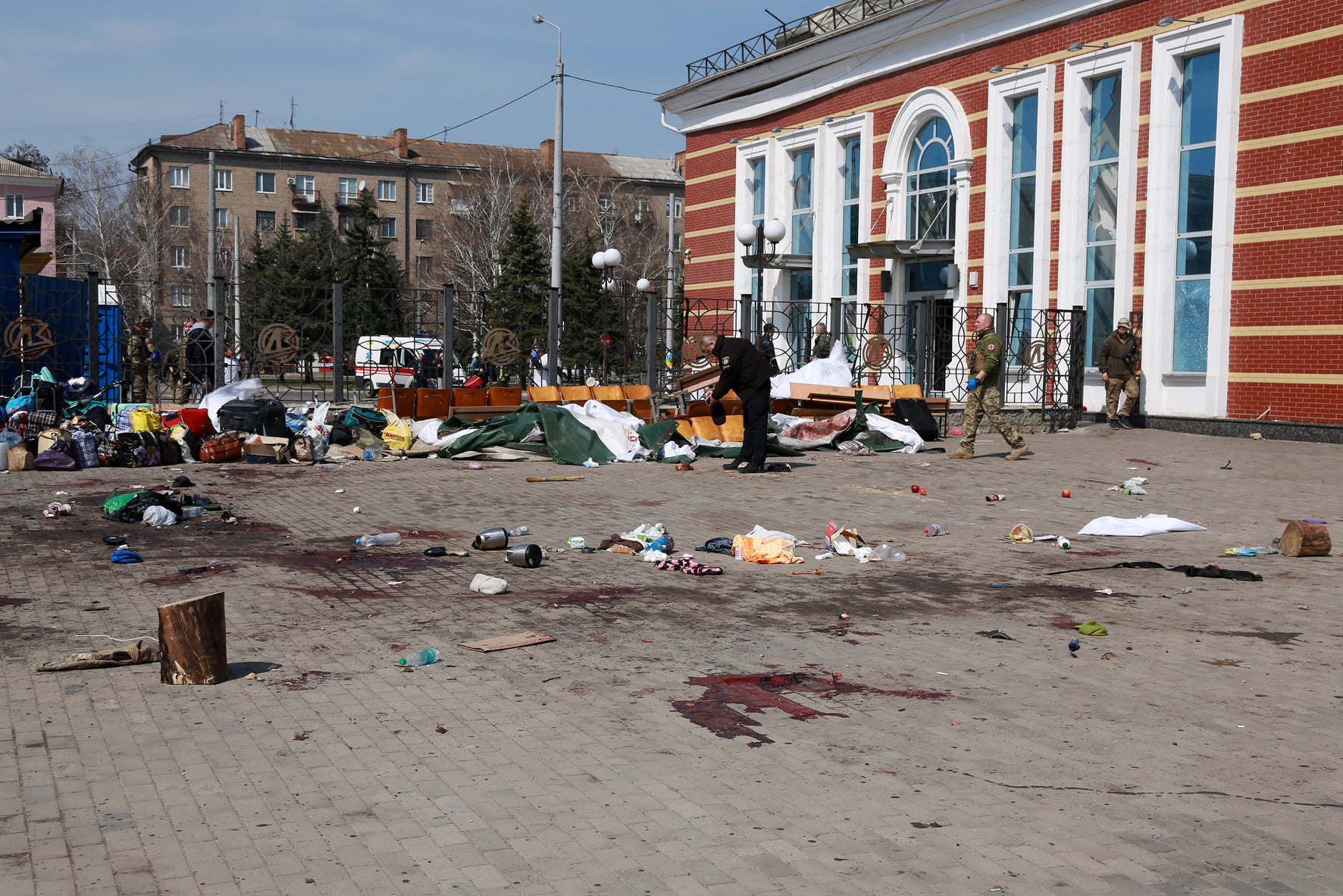
- The aftermath of the attack
- Type: Missile strike
- Location: Kramatorsk, Ukraine; 48°43′34″N 37°32′34″E
- Date: 8 April 2022 ca. 10:30 (UTC+3)
- Executed by: Russia
- Casualties: 63 (including 9 children) killed 150+ injured
- Location within Ukraine

On 8 April 2022, a Russian missile strike hit the railway station of the Ukrainian city of Kramatorsk during the Russian invasion of Ukraine. The strike killed 63 civilians (including 9 children) and wounded 150 (including 34 children).

== Background ==
During the Russian invasion, which began on 24 February, Russian forces entered Ukraine with the goal of assisting the separatist People's Republics of Donetsk and Luhansk in seizing the portions of Donetsk and Luhansk oblasts that were still controlled by the Ukrainian government. The soldiers of the Armed Forces of Ukraine stationed in Sloviansk and Kramatorsk played a key role in resisting the Russian offensive.

On the night of 7 April, pro-Russian Telegram channel ZАПИСКИ VЕТЕРАНА ("Veteran's Notes") warned civilians not to evacuate from Sloviansk and Kramatorsk on railways. At around 10:10 the next morning, shortly before the bombing of the railway station in Kramatorsk, the Russian Ministry of Defence announced that they had hit railway stations in Sloviansk, Pokrovsk, and Barvinkove with "high-precision air-based missiles".

== Attack ==
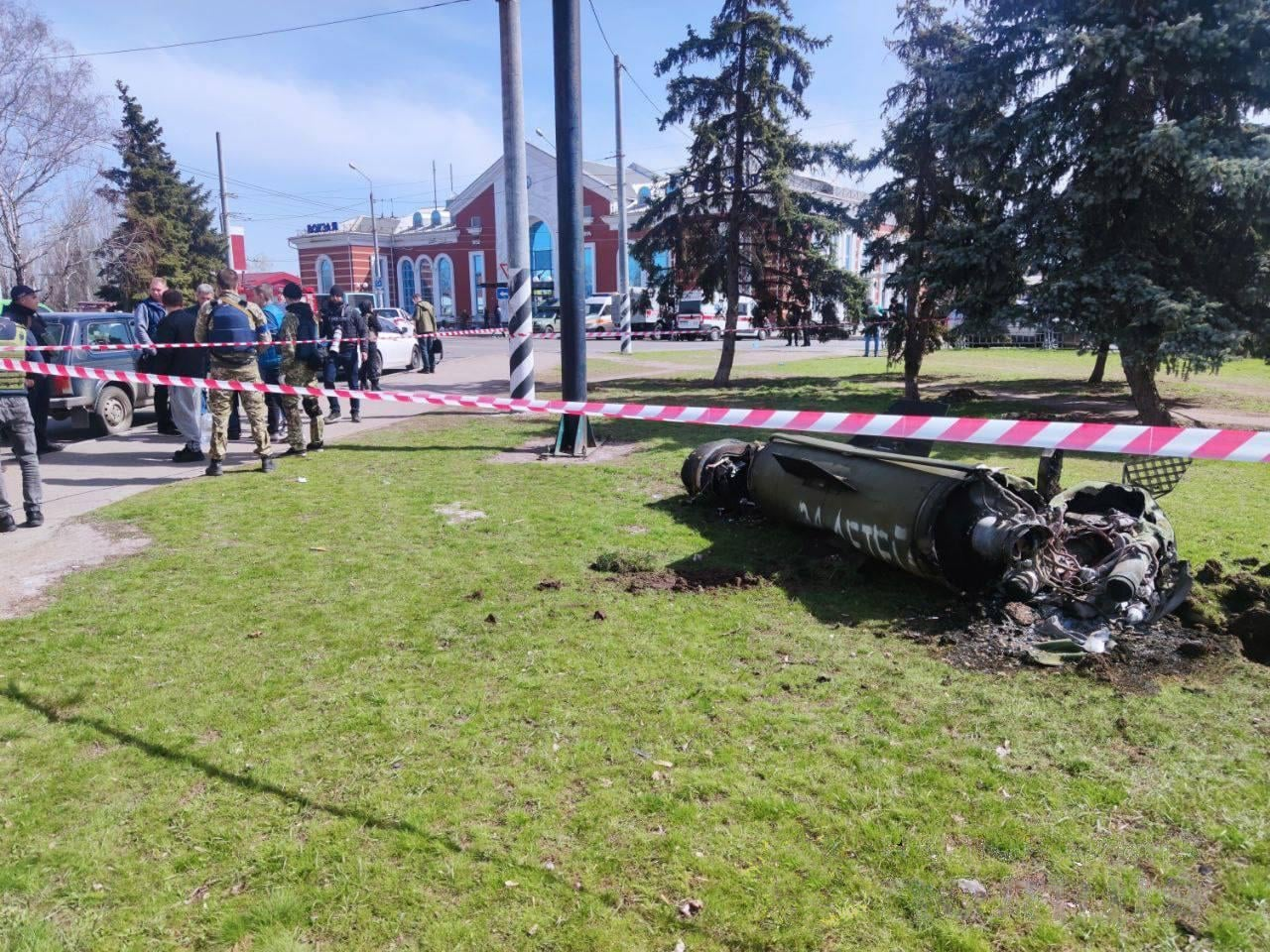
Debris from one of the missiles, with the railway station visible in the background. The top half of the inscription ЗА ДЕТЕЙ ("[in revenge] for the children") is visible.

According to the Ukrainian government, between 1000 and 4000 civilians, mainly women and children, were present at the station awaiting evacuation from the region, which was being subjected to heavy Russian shelling.

At 10:24 and 10:25, media affiliated with the People's Republic of Donetsk published videos showing a pair of missiles being launched from Shakhtarsk, a city under separatist control. At approximately 10:30, two missiles hit near the railway station building in Kramatorsk, and the first reports were published in Ukrainian media at around 10:45.

A World Central Kitchen aid worker who witnessed the attack in Kramatorsk said that he had heard "between five and ten explosions". Reports described the scene as extremely bloody, with several people losing limbs from the explosions. Victims' bodies were strewn around amid abandoned luggage.

The missiles were initially misidentified as Iskander ballistic missiles. Pavlo Kyrylenko, governor of Donetsk oblast, later specified that they had rather been Tochka-U missiles armed with cluster munitions.

The remnants of one of the missiles had the Russian words ЗА ДЕТЕЙ (za detey), meaning "[in revenge] for the children", painted in white on its outside. It also bore serial number Ш91579, which investigators said could potentially help trace it back to its original arsenal.

== Responses ==
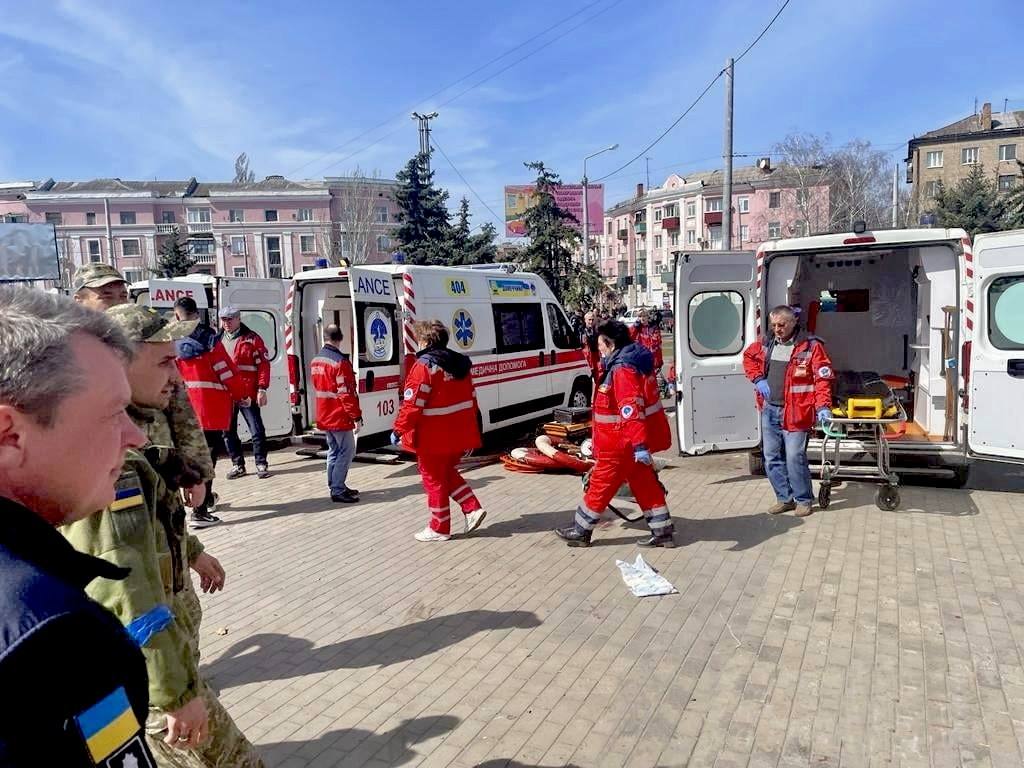
Emergency services at the scene of the incident.

Michelle Bachelet, United Nations High Commissioner for Human Rights, said that the attack "is emblematic of the failure to adhere to the principle of distinction, the prohibition of indiscriminate attacks and the principle of precaution enshrined in international humanitarian law".

Dunja Mijatović, Council of Europe Commissioner for Human Rights, said that the "strike on a densely populated urban area of Ukraine is yet another demonstration of the blatant disregard for civilian life, which has by now sadly become a steady feature of this military aggression".

Ukrainian President Volodymyr Zelenskyy described Russia as "an evil with no limits".

European Commission President Ursula von der Leyen, who visited Ukraine on the day of the attack, condemned the attack as "despicable". French Foreign Minister Jean-Yves Le Drian described the attack as a "crime against humanity", saying that it could not remain unpunished, while British Defence Secretary Ben Wallace condemned it as a war crime.

United Nations Secretary-General António Guterres described the missile strike as "completely unacceptable".

Oleksandr Kamyshin, chairman of Ukrainian Railways, described the event as being a "targeted blow to the passenger infrastructure of the railway and the residents of the city of Kramatorsk". The Security Service of Ukraine opened criminal proceedings under Article 438 of the Criminal Code.

Royal United Services Institute analyst Justin Bronk said that Russia aimed to damage Ukrainian transport infrastructure to make it difficult for Ukrainian forces to move around Donbas. He also suggested that Russia opted for the Tochka-U missile type due to its use by the Ukrainian army, in order to "muddy the waters". The Pentagon highlighted Russian responsibility for the attack, as well as the strategic importance of the railway junction.

=== Response by Russia and its supporters ===
Initially, Russian state media and pro-Russian telegram channels claimed successful Russian airstrikes on a military transport target in Kramatorsk. After it became clear that the missiles had killed civilians, however, earlier reports were redacted, the Russian government denied responsibility for the attack, and the Russian Ministry of Defence characterized it as a Ukrainian hoax. The Russian Ministry of Defence claimed that the missiles were launched by Ukrainian forces from the city of Dobropillia, southwest of Kramatorsk.

Russian media also said that the serial number of the missile was in the same range as one used by Ukrainian forces. Serial numbers cannot be used to prove which side fired the missile, however, since all Tochka-U's were manufactured at a single site in Russia and distributed from there across the Soviet Union. As a result, there was, for example, a close serial number match between a Tochka-U used by Russia in Syria and one used by Ukraine in Snizhne. Moreover, both Russia and Ukraine have made extensive use of munitions captured from the other side.

A fake video clip with a mock BBC logo, attributing blame to the Ukrainian forces, circulated through pro-Russian telegram channels since 10 April. The video was also aired on Russian state television. The BBC has not produced any such video.

=== Assessment of the Russian response ===
The Russian Ministry of Defense claimed that their forces no longer use Tochka-U missiles. However, Amnesty International, the investigative journalists of the Conflict Intelligence Team, and a number of military experts had already reported the use of Tochkas by Russian forces in multiple parts of Ukraine prior to the strike on Kramatorsk. Moreover, investigators from the open-source Belarusian Hajun project had published videos of several Russian trucks with Tochka missiles heading from Belarus to Ukraine with 'V' markings on 5 and 30 March 2022. The Institute for the Study of War assessed that the Russian 8th Combined Arms Army, which is active in the Donbas area, is equipped with Tochka-U missiles. Russian news reports and social media footage showed the 47th Missile Brigade, part of Russia's 8th Combined Arms Army, displaying Tochka-U missiles at public events in 2021, including at the Victory Day parade in Krasnodar.

On 14 April, Bellingcat stated that open source evidence remained insufficient to establish the direction from which the missile had been fired.

On 18 April, PolitiFact assessed the possibility of the incident being a false flag, concluding that "there's no credible evidence that Ukraine was behind the April 8 attack at the Kramatorsk train station."

== Documentary ==
In 2023 Ukrainian filmmaker Aleksandr Kirienko made a documentary, Save The Grasshopper, about the incident.

== See also ==
- Attacks on civilians in the Russian invasion of Ukraine
- 2022 Kremenchuk missile strike
- War crimes in the Russian invasion of Ukraine
- 2026 Kramatorsk bus massacre
- Malaysia Airlines Flight 17
- Chaplyne railway station attack
