= Hroza, Kharkiv Oblast =

Hroza Гроза
- Village
- Location of Hroza within Ukraine Hroza (Ukraine)
- Coordinates: 49.673056°N 37.208333°E
- Country: Ukraine
- Oblast: Kharkiv Oblast
- Raion: Kupiansk Raion
- Hromada: Shevchenkove settlement hromada
- Founded: 1922

Area
  - Total: 1.81 km^{2} (0.70 sq mi)
- Elevation: 167 m (548 ft)

Population (2001 census)
  - Total: 497
  - Density: 275/km^{2} (711/sq mi)
- Time zone: UTC+2 (EET)
  - Summer (DST): UTC+3 (EEST)
- Postal code: 63609
- Area code: +380 5751

Hroza (Ukrainian: Гроза, pronounced [ɦroˈzɑ]) is a village in the Kupiansk Raion of Kharkiv Oblast in northeastern Ukraine. It belongs to Shevchenkove settlement hromada, one of the hromadas of Ukraine, and is just outside the town of Shevchenkove. It is 34 kilometres (21 mi) west of Kupiansk and 79 kilometres (49 mi) southeast by east (SEbE) of the centre of Kharkiv city.

In October 2023, the village became known for being the site of a missile attack by the Russian Armed Forces against civilians, which killed a large amount of its population.

== History ==
Hroza was founded in 1922. Its name means "thunderstorm" in the Ukrainian language.

In the 2020 Ukrainian administrative reforms, Hroza was included in Shevchenkove settlement hromada on 12 June 2020. On 17 July 2020, Hroza, along with the surrounding hromada, was transferred from Shevchenkove Raion to Kupiansk Raion.

=== Russian invasion of Ukraine ===
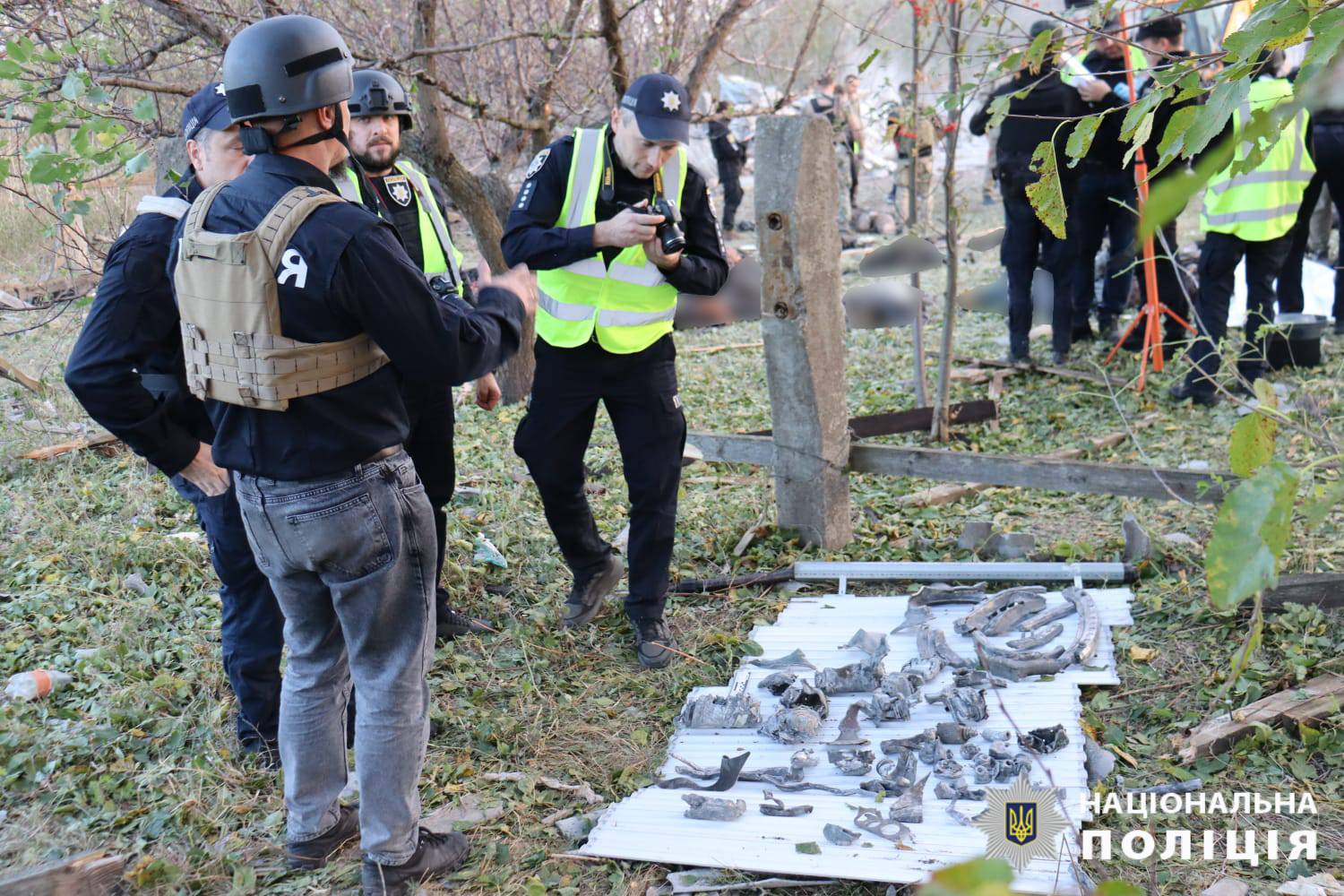
Remains of the missile used in the October 2023 attack on the village

During the Russian invasion of Ukraine, from February to September 2022 the village was under Russian occupation. On 9 September 2022, during the Kharkiv counteroffensive, the Armed Forces of Ukraine liberated the village. However, the village continued to be shelled "relentlessly" by Russia, displacing many people from the village.

On 5 October 2023, the Russian army shelled a shop and a cafe, killing 59 people, including a six-year-old child. The attack killed almost a fifth of Hroza's population, and was called the deadliest civilian attack yet of the year by a United Nations High Commissioner for Refugees source.

== Demographics ==
In 2001 the settlement had 497 inhabitants, native language as of the 2001 Ukrainian census:

- Ukrainian – 93.2%
- Russian – 4.4%
- Others – 2.4%
