= Komyshuvakha, Zaporizhzhia Oblast =

Urban locality in Zaporizhzhia Oblast, Ukraine

Komyshuvakha Комишуваха
- Rural settlement
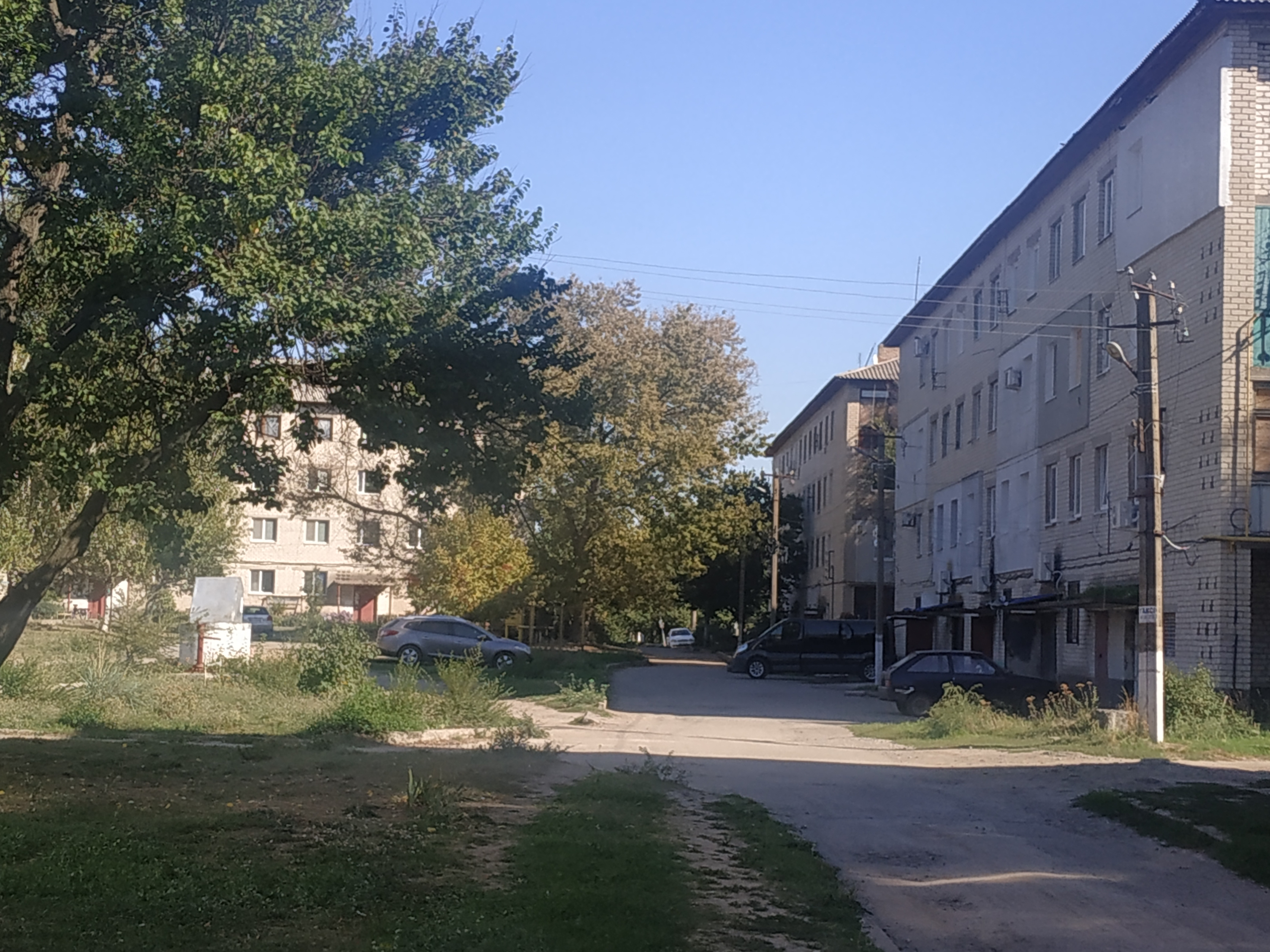

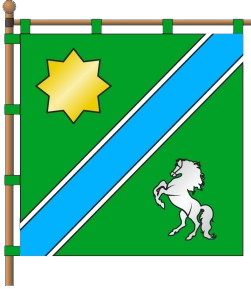
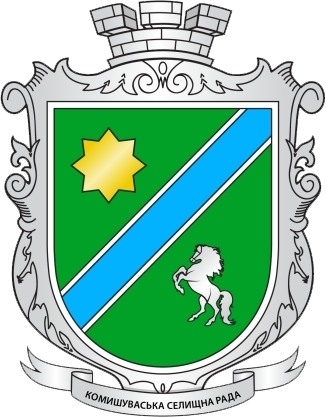
- Flag Coat of arms

- Location of Komyshuvakha in Zaporizhzhia Oblast Komyshuvakha (Ukraine)
- Coordinates: 47°43′10″N 35°31′29″E
- Country: Ukraine
- Oblast: Zaporizhzhia Oblast
- Raion: Zaporizhzhia Raion
- Founded: 1770
- Town status: 1957

Area
  - Total: 6.77 km^{2} (2.61 sq mi)
- Elevation: 29 m (95 ft)

Population (2022)
  - Total: 5,251
  - Density: 776/km^{2} (2,010/sq mi)
- Time zone: UTC+2 (EET)
  - Summer (DST): UTC+3 (EEST)
- Postal code: 70530–532
- Area code: +380 6141
- Website: http://rada.gov.ua/

Komyshuvakha (Ukrainian: Комишуваха [komeʃʊˈʋɑxɐ]; Russian: Камышеваха, romanized: Kamyshevakha) is a rural settlement in Zaporizhzhia Raion, Zaporizhzhia Oblast, southern Ukraine. It was formerly administered within Orikhiv Raion until 2020. Its population was 5,452 in the 2001 Ukrainian Census. Current population: 5,251 (2022 estimate). It is located on the Konka river.

== History ==
Komyshuvakha was first founded in 1770 under the name Pavlovka-Kamychevakha (derived from the dedication of its church and the name of the local river); it was later renamed Komyshuvakha and given the status of an urban-type settlement in 1957. It is named after the Komyshuvakha River which flows through the settlement. During Soviet times it served as a district centre. to house the families of soldiers defending this frontier of the Russian Empire; the Dnieper line of fortifications lay four kilometers to the east. It fell under the jurisdiction of the Mariupol Uyezd within the Yekaterinoslav Governorate. By 1859, the village had 1,660 inhabitants, and by 1899, that number had reached 4,200. In 1873, the village was transferred to the administration of the Alexandrovka Uyezd.

In 1913, Pavlivka had a population of 5,177. The population declined during the Russian Civil War.

Until 26 January 2024, Komyshuvakha was designated urban-type settlement. On this day, a new law entered into force which abolished this status, and Komyshuvakha became a rural settlement.

Members of the State Emergency Service of Ukraine in Zaporizhzhia Oblast responding to the strike on 2-3 November 2026.

On 2 November 2026, Russian forces struck the settlement with at least nine FAB-3000 and KAB-500 aerial bombs in a double-tap strike. One of the bombs struck a school that was being used to distribute humanitarian aid. As of 16 November, it is reported that at least 72 people have been killed, and another 4 are unaccounted for. After the first wave that had targeted the school, Russian forces double-tapped, killing two first responders who had arrived, with the Police of Ukraine also confirming four of its officers had been killed.

According to the local governor, Mykhailo Semikin, the basement of the school was also being used as a shelter after the school closed down, after most of the settlement's residents had left due to the frontline coming closer. The basement in the school had been recently built through funding from the European Union, and was designed to handle most strikes. However, the massive amount of force from the bombs caused the structure to collapse on itself, starting a fire. The UN Human Rights Monitoring Mission in Ukraine confirmed that the attack took place at the moment civilians had to gather to receive humanitarian aid, and called it a violation of the most fundamental principles of international humanitarian law. President Volodymyr Zelenskyy called the attack a "vile, terrorist strike", while the Russians did not comment. It was confirmed that a three-day regional day of mourning would be applied to the whole of Zaporizhzhia Oblast due to the strike, which would be from 3-5 November 2026.

== Religion ==
The settlement is home to an Orthodox church—the Church of Saint Michael the Archangel—and a women’s monastery, the Saint Elizabeth Monastery.

== Demographics ==
As of the 2001 Ukrainian census, the settlement had a population of 5,452 inhabitants. The linguistic composition of the settlement was as follows:

Native languages in Komyshuvakha
| | percent |
| Ukrainian | 91.3% |
| Russian | 8.3% |
| Belarusian | 0.1% |
| others | 0.3% |
