= Aleksander Groza =

Polish poet and writer (1807–1875)

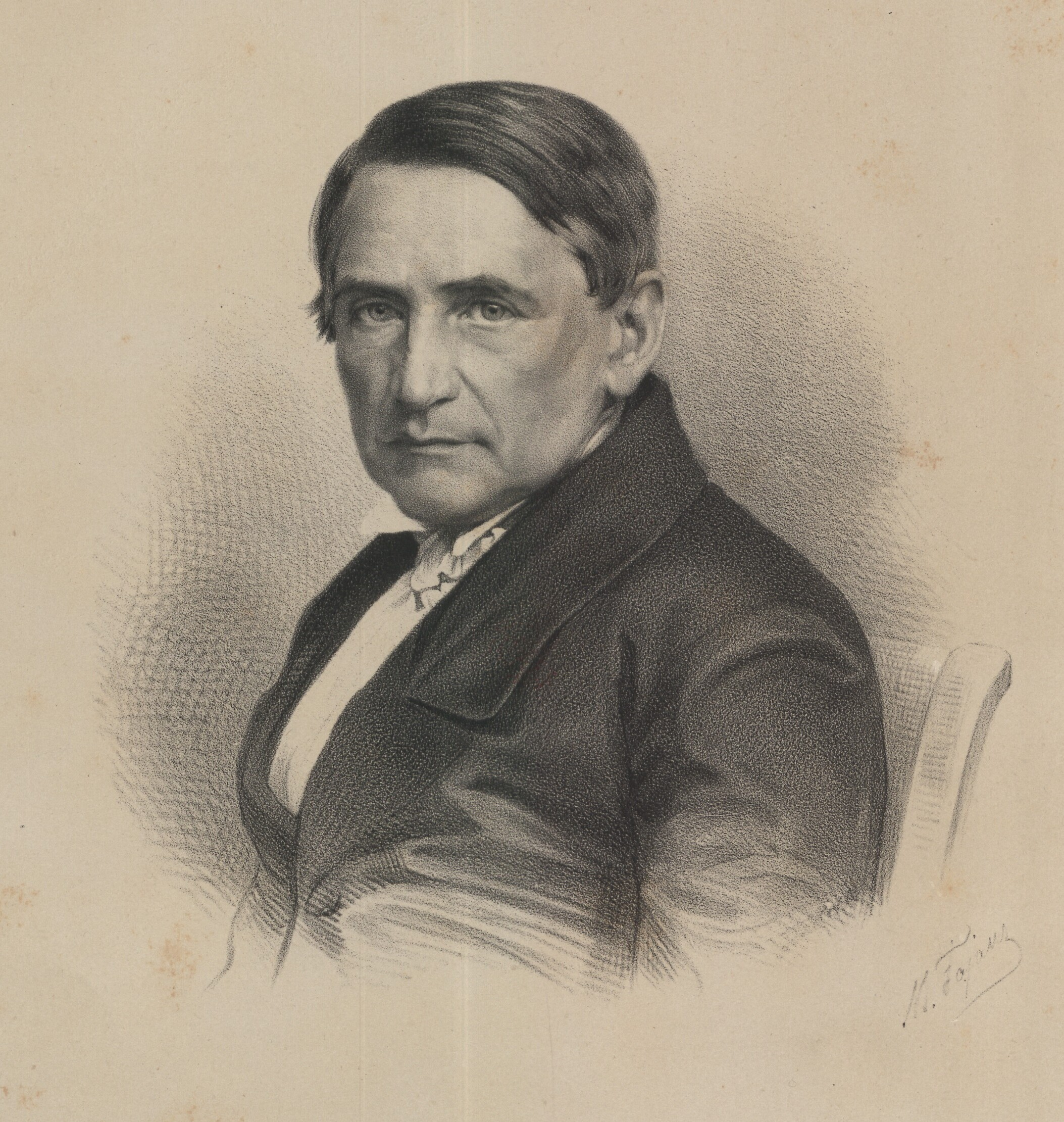
- Born: June 30, 1807; Zakrynychchya, Russian Empire (present day Ukraine)
- Died: November 3, 1875; Gorodkivka, Russian Empire (present day Ukraine)
- Resting place: Bezimenne, Ukraine

Aleksander Groza (30 June 1807 – 3 November 1875) was a Polish poet and writer. He was born in Zakrynychchya, Russian Empire (in present-day Ukraine) on June 30, 1807, and died in Gorodkivka, Russian Empire (in present-day Ukraine) on November 3, 1875. His resting place was Bezimenne, Ukraine.

From 1838 to 1842 he worked on the almanac "Rusałka", which was published in Vilnius. He then worked as the co-organizer of a publishing and bookselling house in Zhytomyr.
