= Grozăvești Power Station =

Power plant in Bucharest, Romania

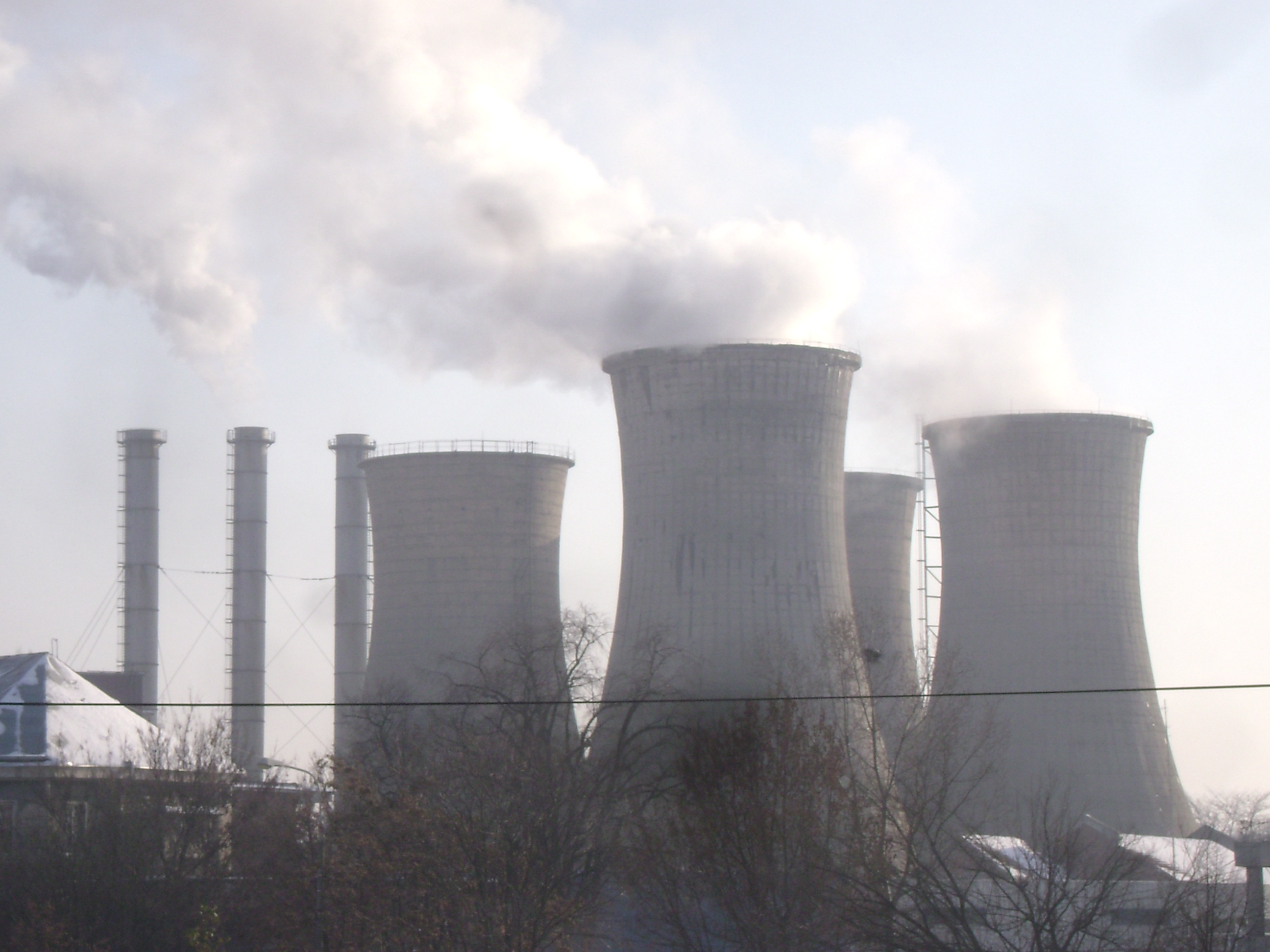
- Grozăvești Power Station in Bucharest, as seen in December 2009
- Country: Romania
- Location: Bucharest
- Coordinates: 44°26′25″N 26°3′46″E
- Status: Operational
- Owner: Termoelectrica

Thermal power station
- Primary fuel: Natural gas and coke
- Cogeneration?: Yes

Power generation
- Units operational: 2
- Nameplate capacity: 100 MW

External links
- Website: elcen.ro
- Commons: Related media on Commons

The Grozăvești Power Station is a large thermal power plant located at 229 Splaiul Independenței Street, Sector 6, Bucharest. It has 2 generation groups of 50 MW, each having a total electricity generation capacity of 100 MW.
