= 2023 Kramatorsk restaurant missile strike =

27 June 2023 Russian attack on a pizzeria in Ukraine

June 2023 Kramatorsk missile strike
- Part of the eastern Ukraine campaign
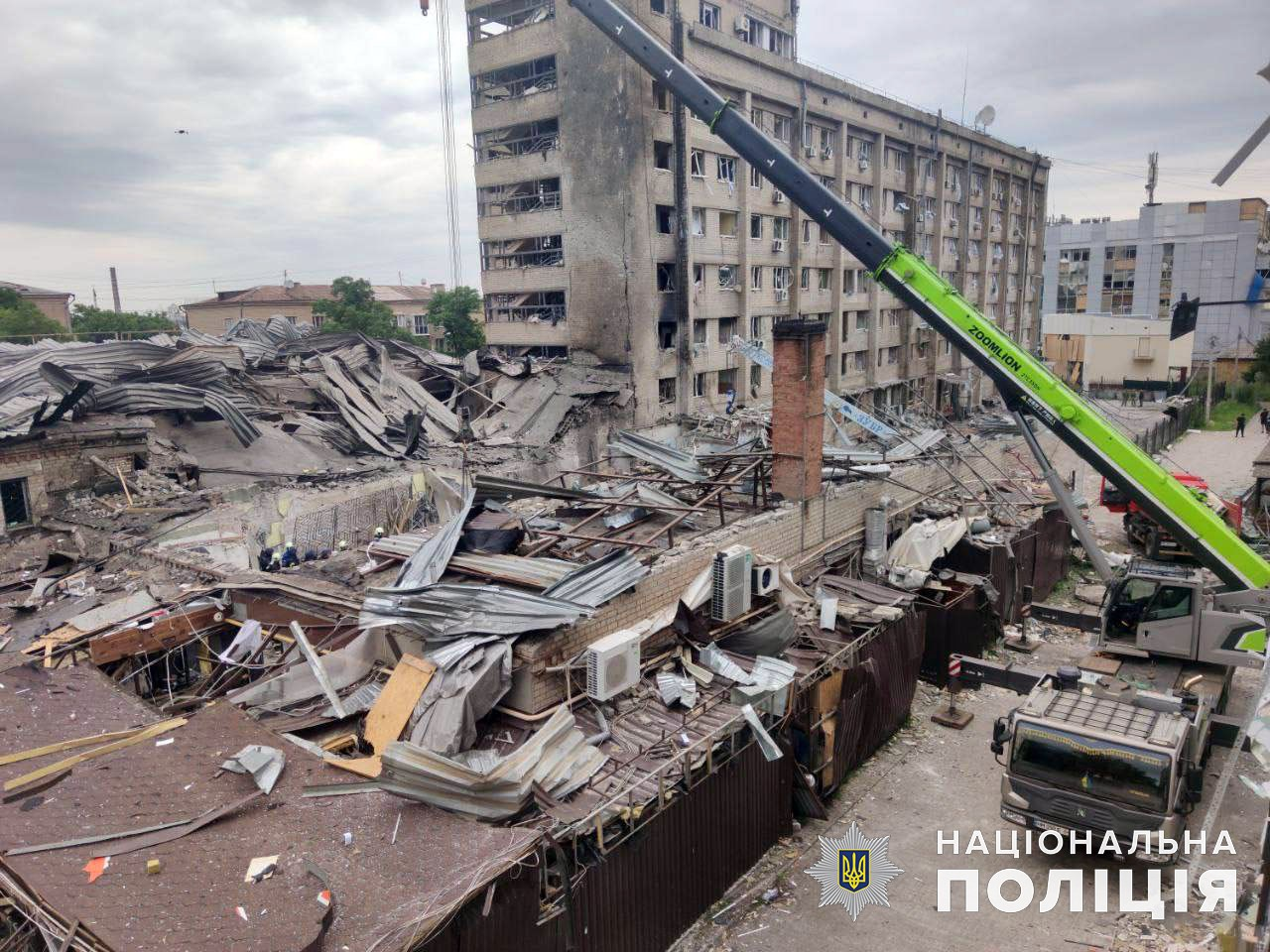
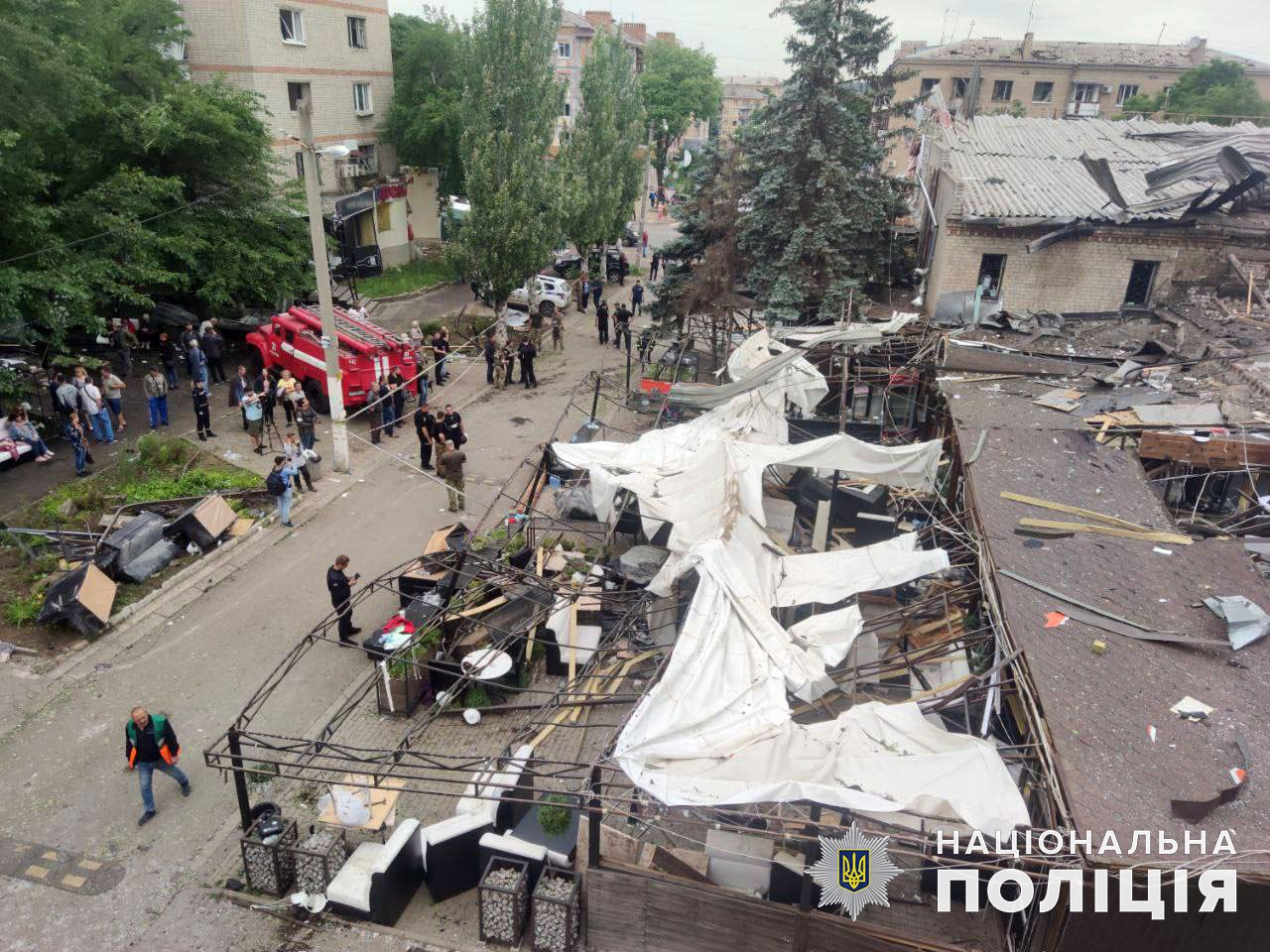
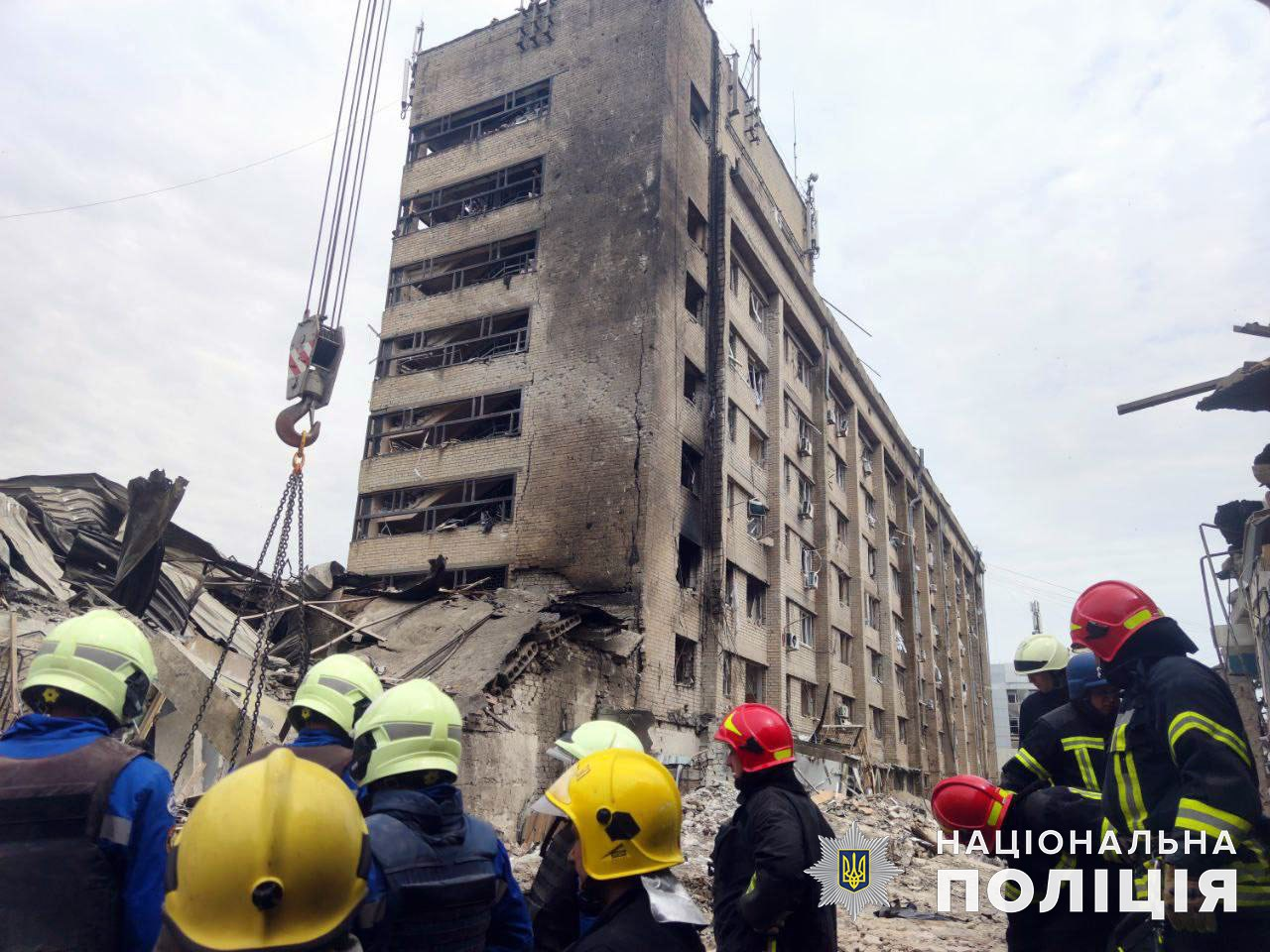
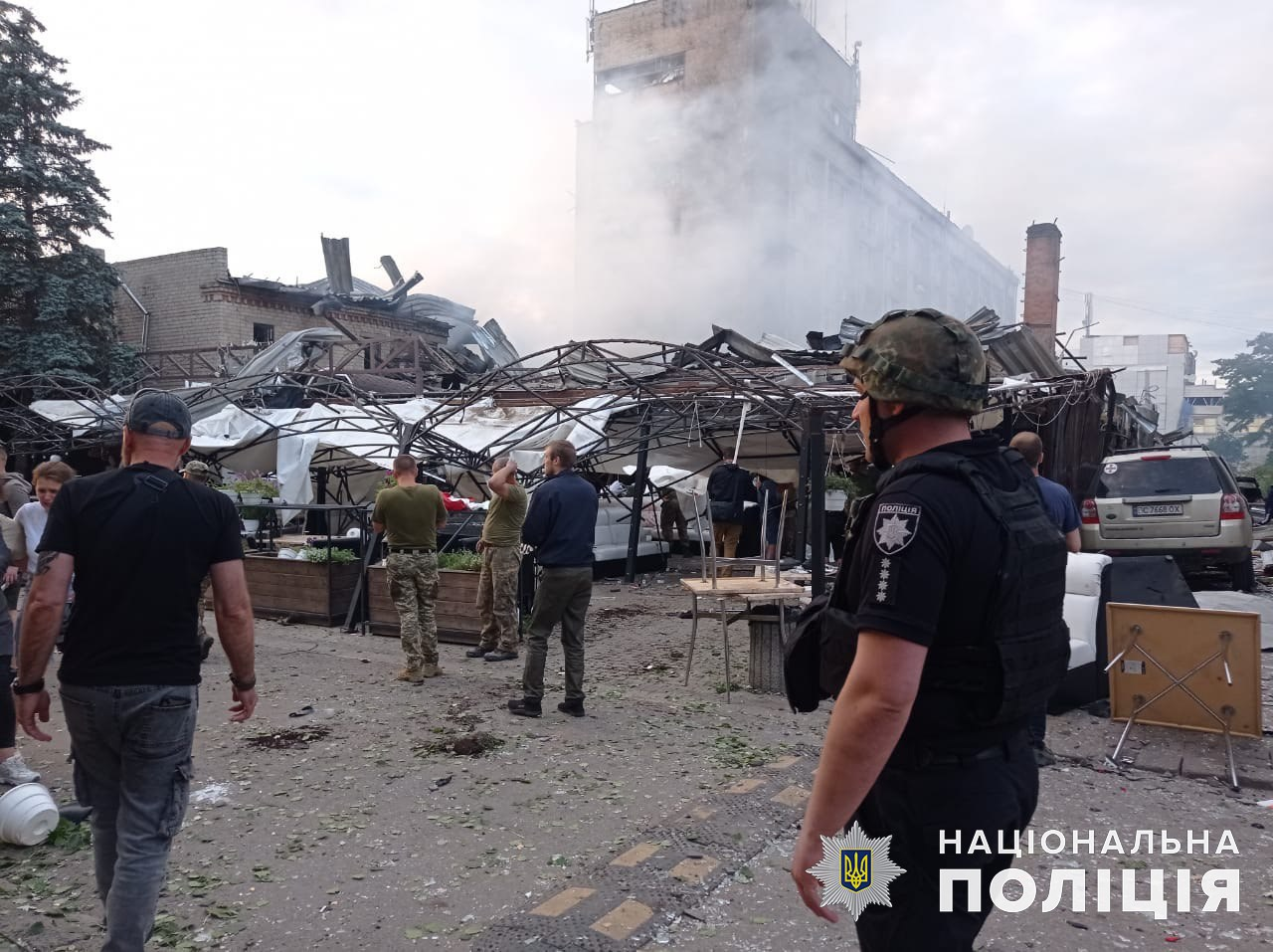
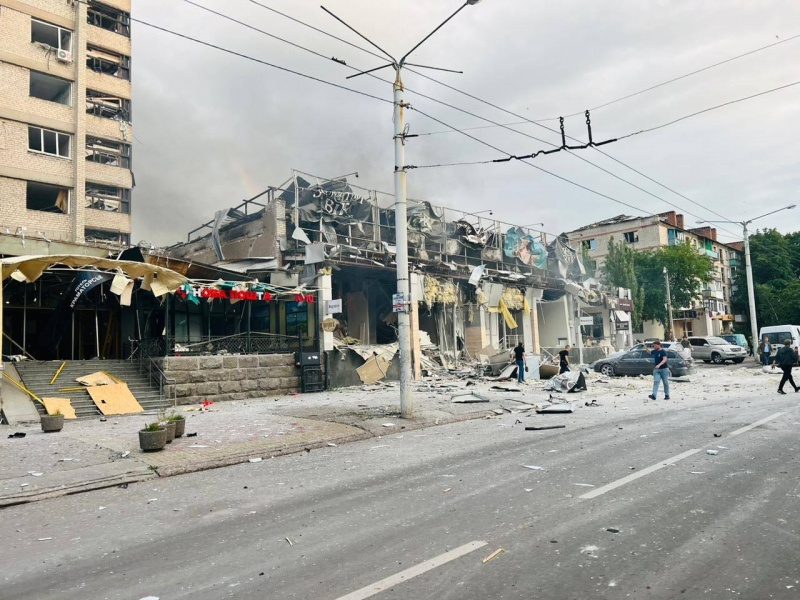
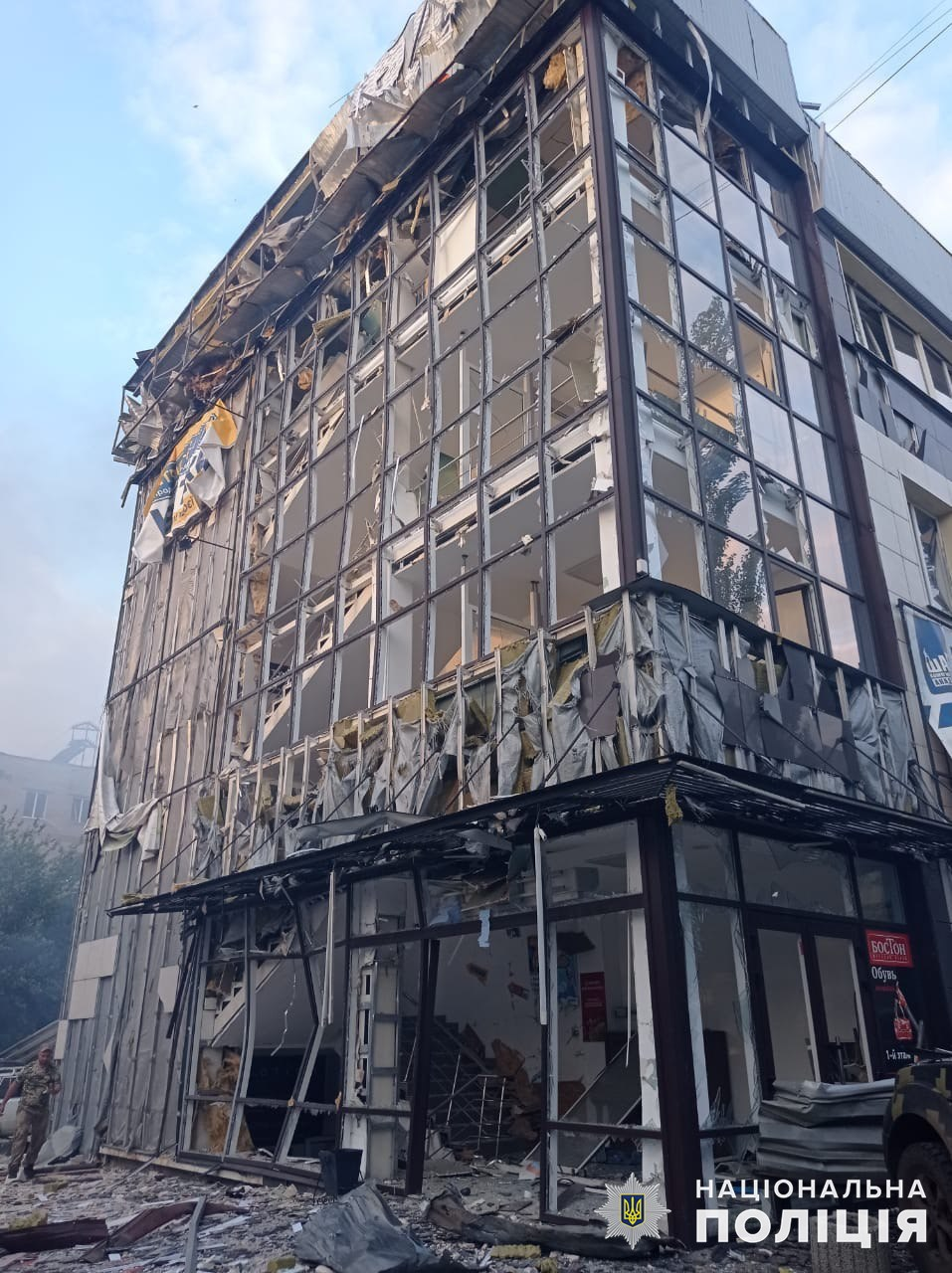
- Kramatorsk restaurant after the Russian missile strike
- Pizzeria
- Location: 48°44′07″N 37°35′13″E; Kramatorsk, Donetsk Oblast, Ukraine
- Date: 27 June 2023; 7:30 pm
- Weapon: Iskander ballistic missile
- Deaths: 13 (including 4 children)
- Injuries: 65 (including an 8-month-old child)
- Perpetrator: Russia
- Motive: Terrorism

On the evening of 27 June 2023, at around 7:30 p.m., Russia launched two Iskander ballistic missile strikes against civilian buildings in Kramatorsk, Ukraine, during the Russian invasion of Ukraine. The main target was a pizza restaurant which housed up to 80 customers and staff at that time. Thirteen people were killed, including Ukrainian novelist Victoria Amelina, a 17-year-old girl, a pair of 14-year old twin sisters and Ian Tortorici, a US Marine Corps veteran, while 61 were injured in the explosions. Another missile hit a village on the outskirts of Kramatorsk, injuring five more people.

The restaurant was popular among locals, soldiers, foreign correspondents and aid workers. Among the injured were Colombian novelist and journalist Héctor Abad Faciolince and his friend Sergio Jaramillo Caro. Kramatorsk was 24 kilometers from the battle front at the time.

== Responses ==
The attack occurred shortly after the conclusion of the Wagner Group rebellion in Russia, which threatened the authority of President Vladimir Putin. High Representative of the European Union for Foreign Affairs and Security Policy Josep Borrell and Ukraine's President Volodymyr Zelenskyy condemned the attack as "Russian terror against Ukrainian civilians". The Ukrainian army later arrested a man suspected of having spied on the vehicles parked outside the restaurant and forwarding the video to the Russian military intelligence.

US President Joe Biden condemned the attack and said that Putin became a "pariah around the world". Denise Brown, UN's Humanitarian Coordinator for Ukraine, issued a statement describing the attack as "another example of [the] inexcusable level of suffering Russia’s invasion is inflicting on the people of Ukraine. International humanitarian law protects civilians and civilian infrastructure, and everything must be done to minimize or avoid civilian harm, including by verifying targets".

PEN Ukraine and Truth Hounds referred to the strike as a war crime, with the latter being the organization Ukrainian writer and victim of the strike Victoria Amelina was a war crimes documentarian for. PEN Ukraine stated, "They clearly knew that they were shelling a place with many civilians inside". Sky News international affairs editor Dominic Waghorn stated that, since a high-precision missile was used to carry out the strike, "they probably knew exactly what they were firing at", and that "this is an alleged war crime". France's Minister for Europe and Foreign Affairs Catherine Colonna called the strike a war crime and an "act of terror", as did Sweden's Ministry for Foreign Affairs.

== Victims ==
Pizzeria employees:

1. Andriichuk Kateryna Andriivna, born 2004 (18 years old; cook)
2. Bashkeeva Zoryana Valeriivna, born 1999 (24 years old; waitress)
3. Yevgenia Oleksandrivna Golovchenko, born December 2005 (17; dryer)
4. Mykyta Valentynovich Dolgopol, born April 25, 1999 (24; senior cook)
5. Zakharov Roman Ruslanovich (20 years old, waiter)
6. Valeriya Ruslanivna Simonnik, born August 23, 2005 (17; dryer)
7. Titoruk Artur Volodymyrovych, born 1994 (28 years old; administrator)

Pizzeria visitors:

1. Twin sisters Yulia and Anna Aksenchenko, born September 4, 2008 (14; schoolchildren)
2. Amelina Viktoriya Yuriivna, born January 1, 1986 (37; writer)
3. Orlovsky Artur (30 years old, entrepreneur)
4. Artem Olegovich Suhoviy (22 years old, combat medic 1 ShB 3 OShBr)
5. Ian Tortorici, call sign "Frank" (23 years old, volunteer International Legion, former US Marine)

== Gallery ==
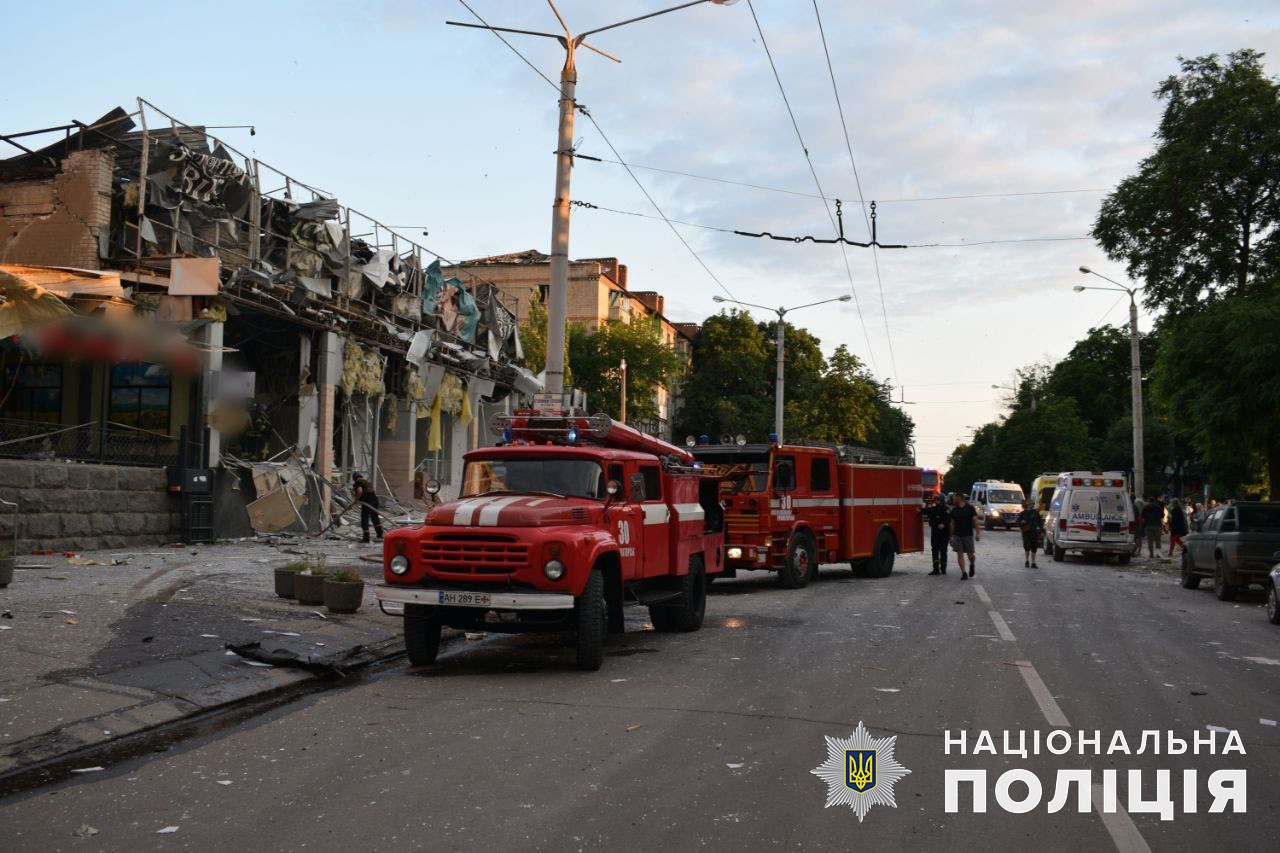

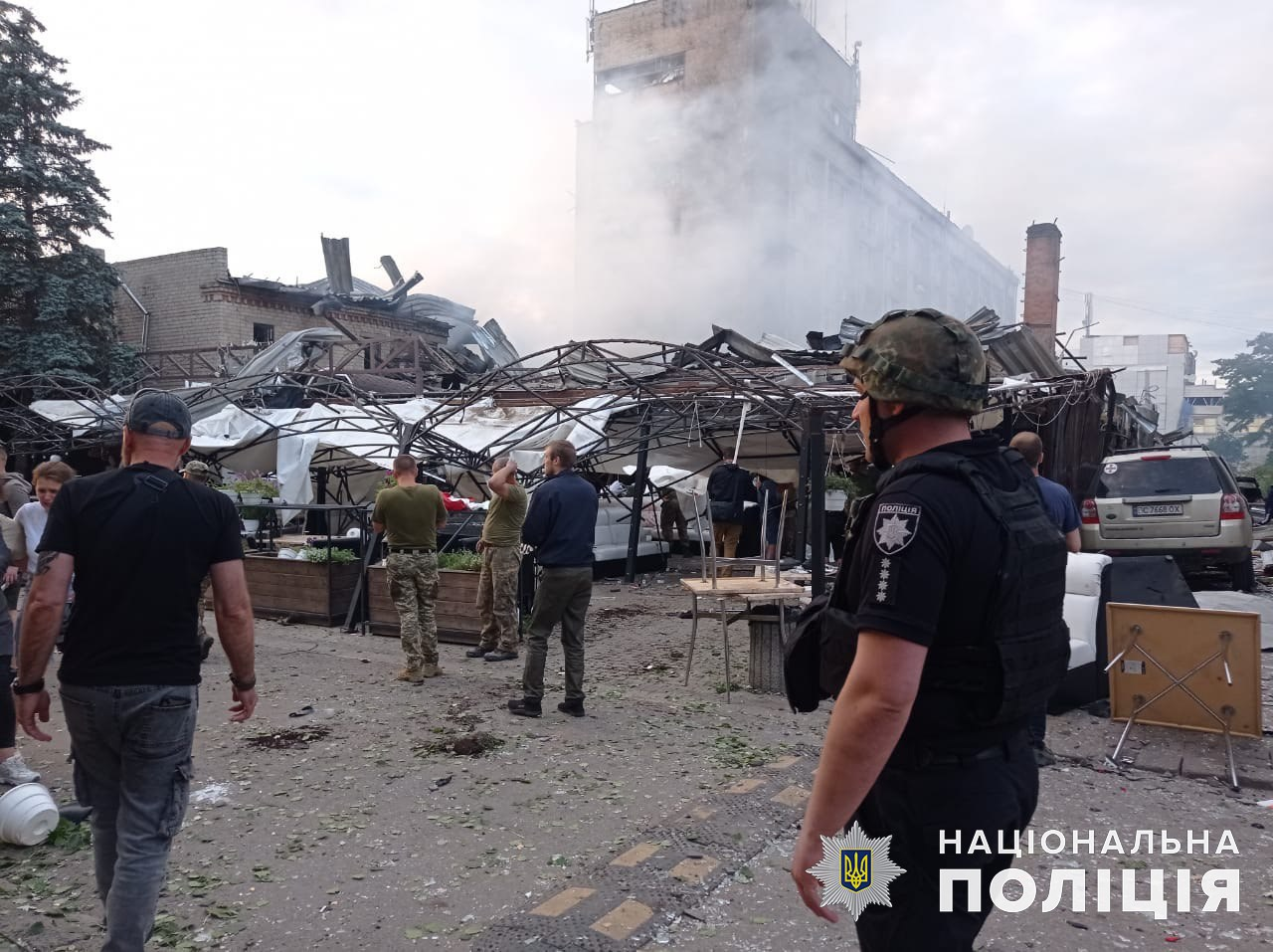

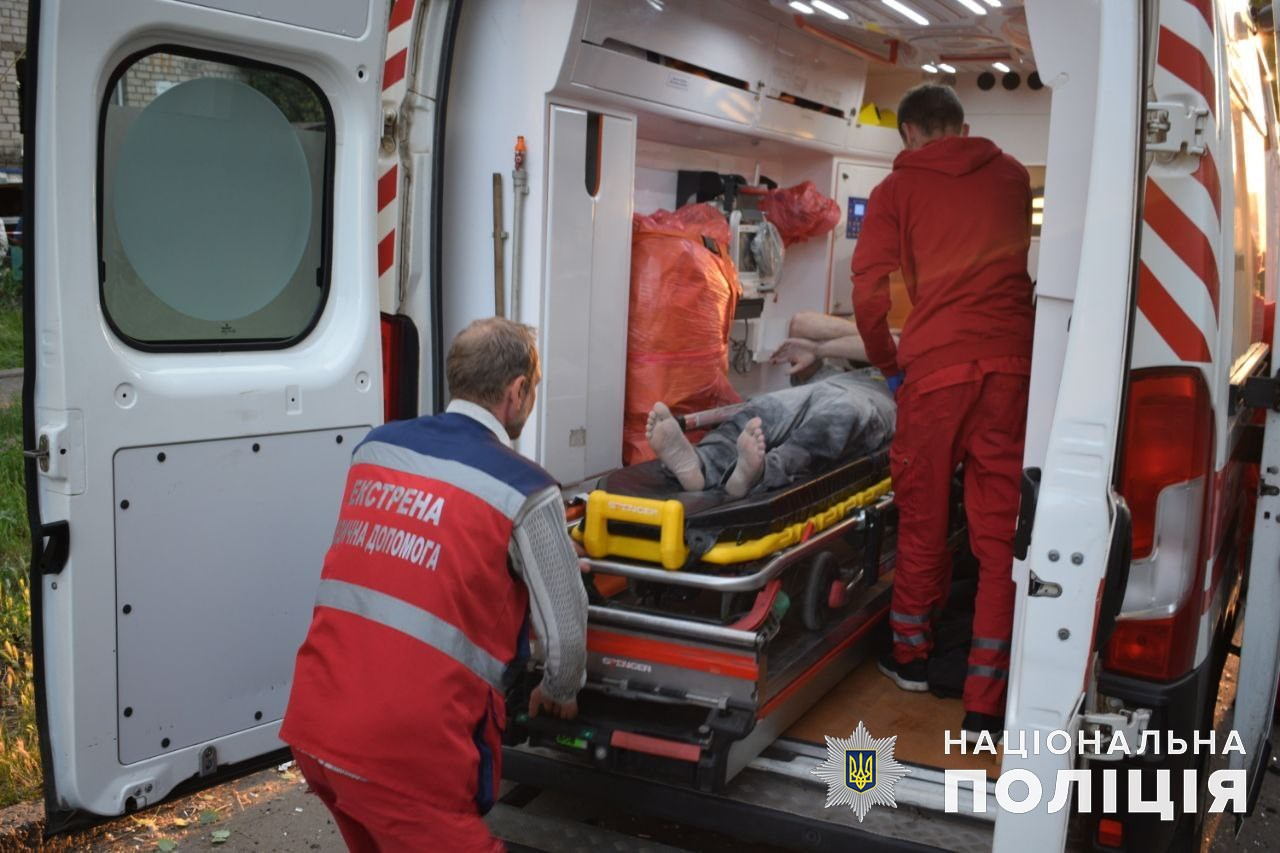

== See also ==
- Attacks on civilians in the Russian invasion of Ukraine
- April 2023 Sloviansk airstrike
- Kramatorsk railway station attack
- February 2015 Kramatorsk rocket attack
- Russian war crimes
