= 14 May 2026 Russian strikes on Ukraine =

Missile strike during the Russo-Ukrainian war

- Part of Russian strikes against Ukrainian infrastructure (2022–present)
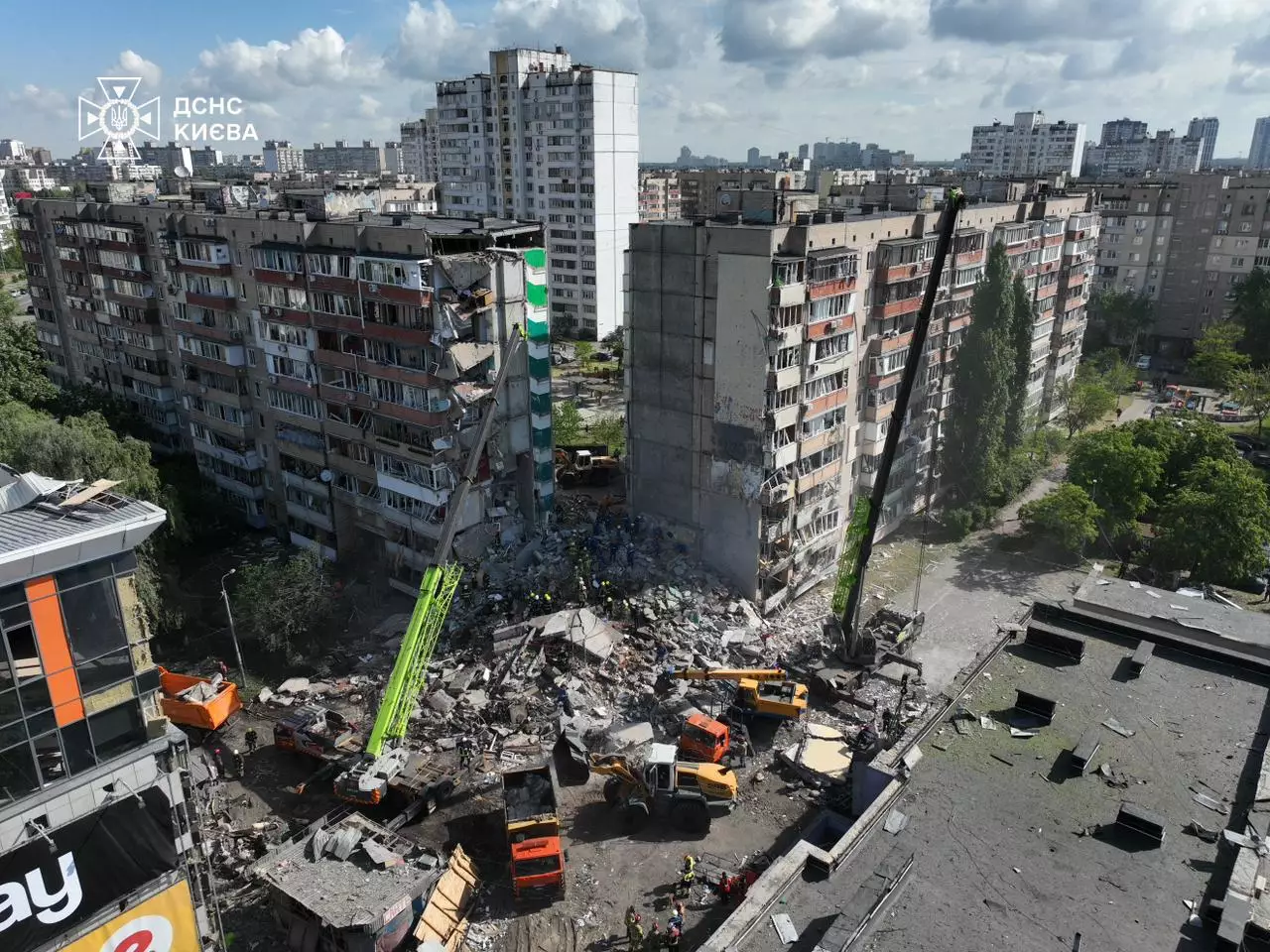
- A residential building hit in Kyiv during the strikes, reportedly killing 24
- Location: Kyiv and other parts of Ukraine
- Date: 13–14 May 2026
- Deaths: 27 (24 in Kyiv)
- Injuries: 75+
- Perpetrator: Russian Air Force

During the night of 13–14 May 2026, Russia conducted what was described as its "largest aerial attack" since the Russian invasion of Ukraine. 1,567 drones and 56 missiles targeted several Ukrainian cities, according to a statement made by Ukrainian President Zelenskyy, with a large number targeting the Darnytskyi District of Kyiv specifically. In total, 27 civilians were reported dead with 24 of whom being from Kyiv, with an additional 75 injured between Kyiv and Kharkiv.

The State Emergency Service of Ukraine declared the following day, 15 May, a day of mourning. In response to the strikes, Ukraine in turn launched what was described by Tass as the largest drone attack on the Moscow region in more than a year on 17 May.

== Consequences ==
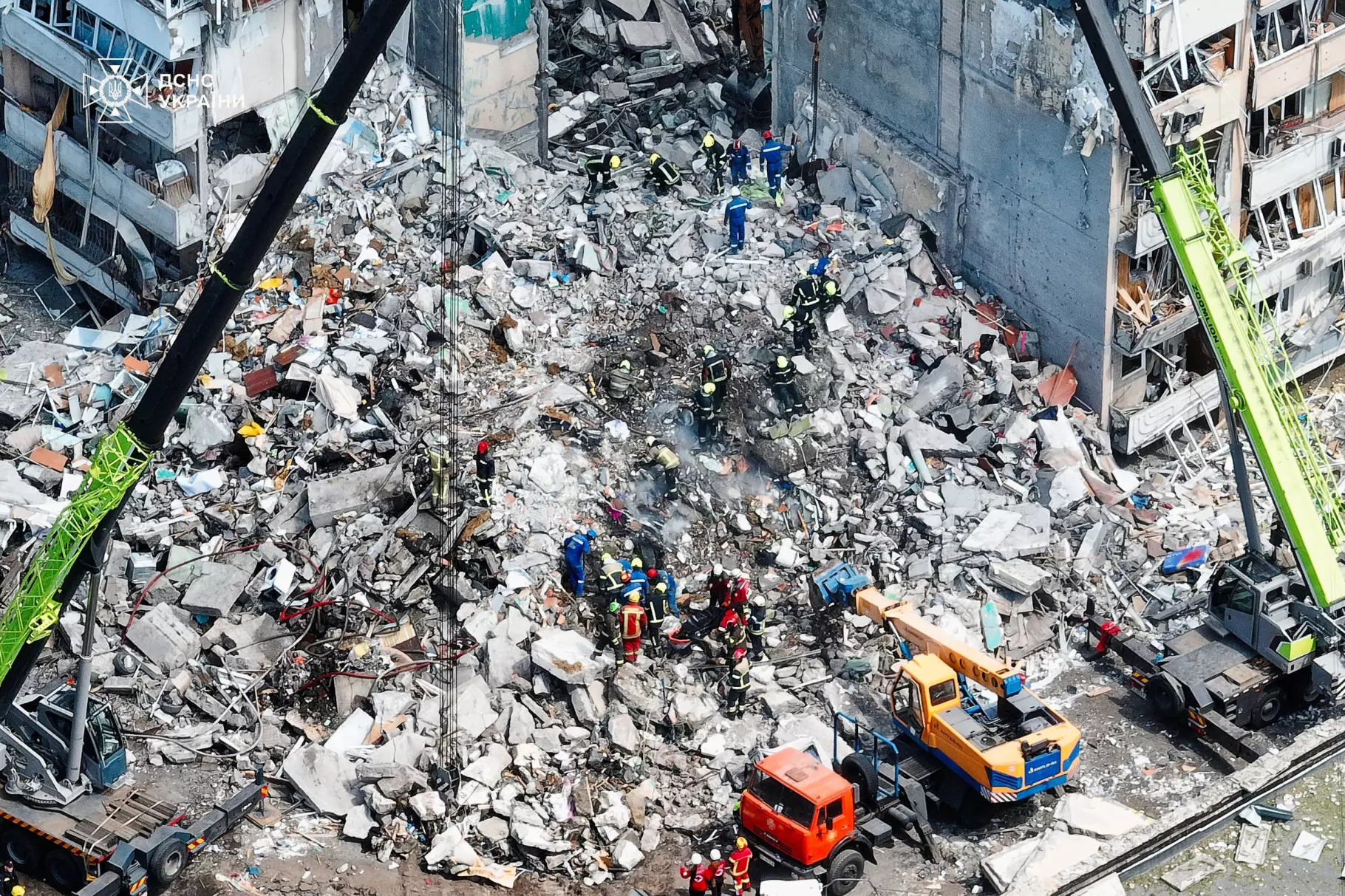

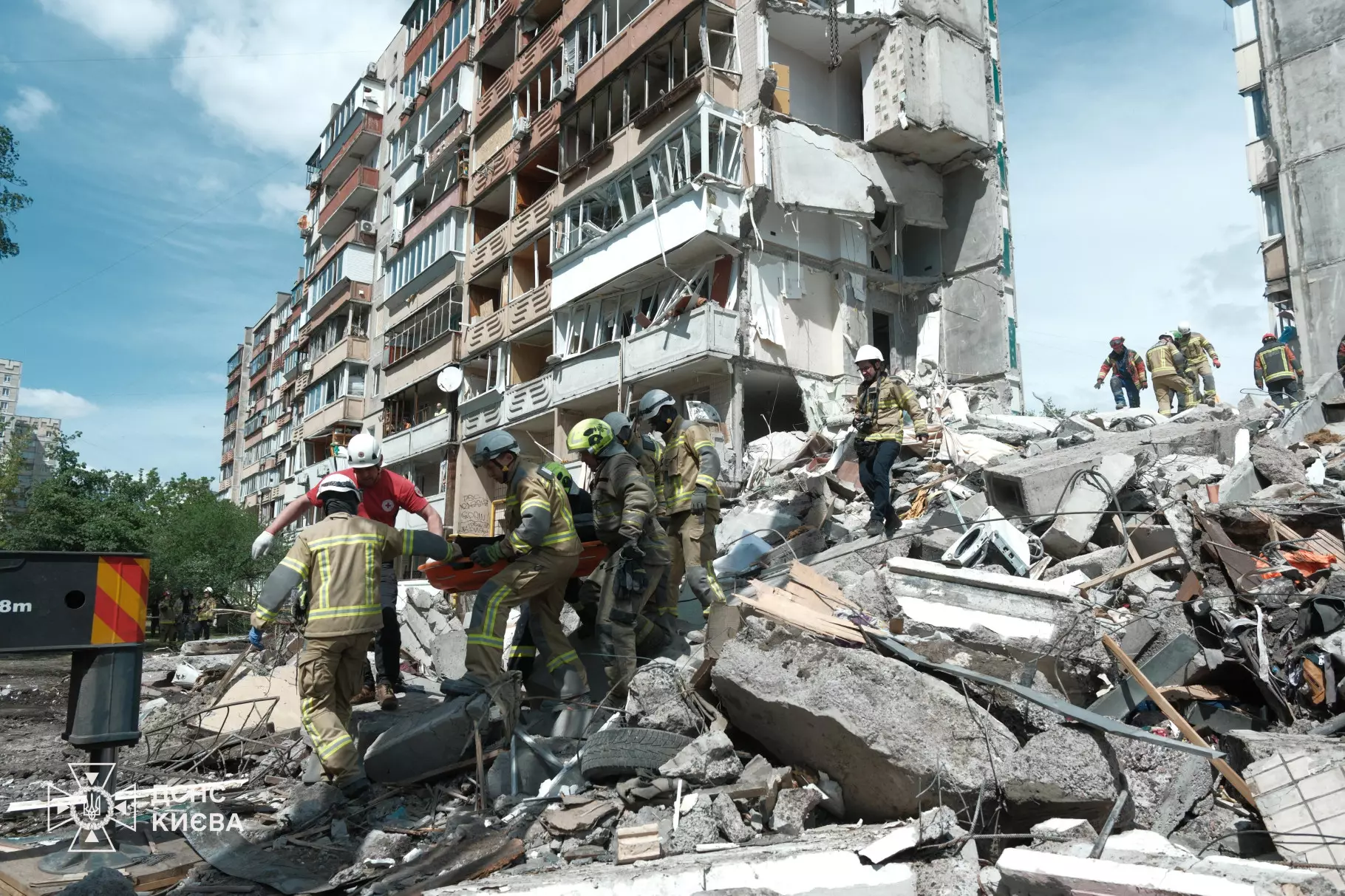

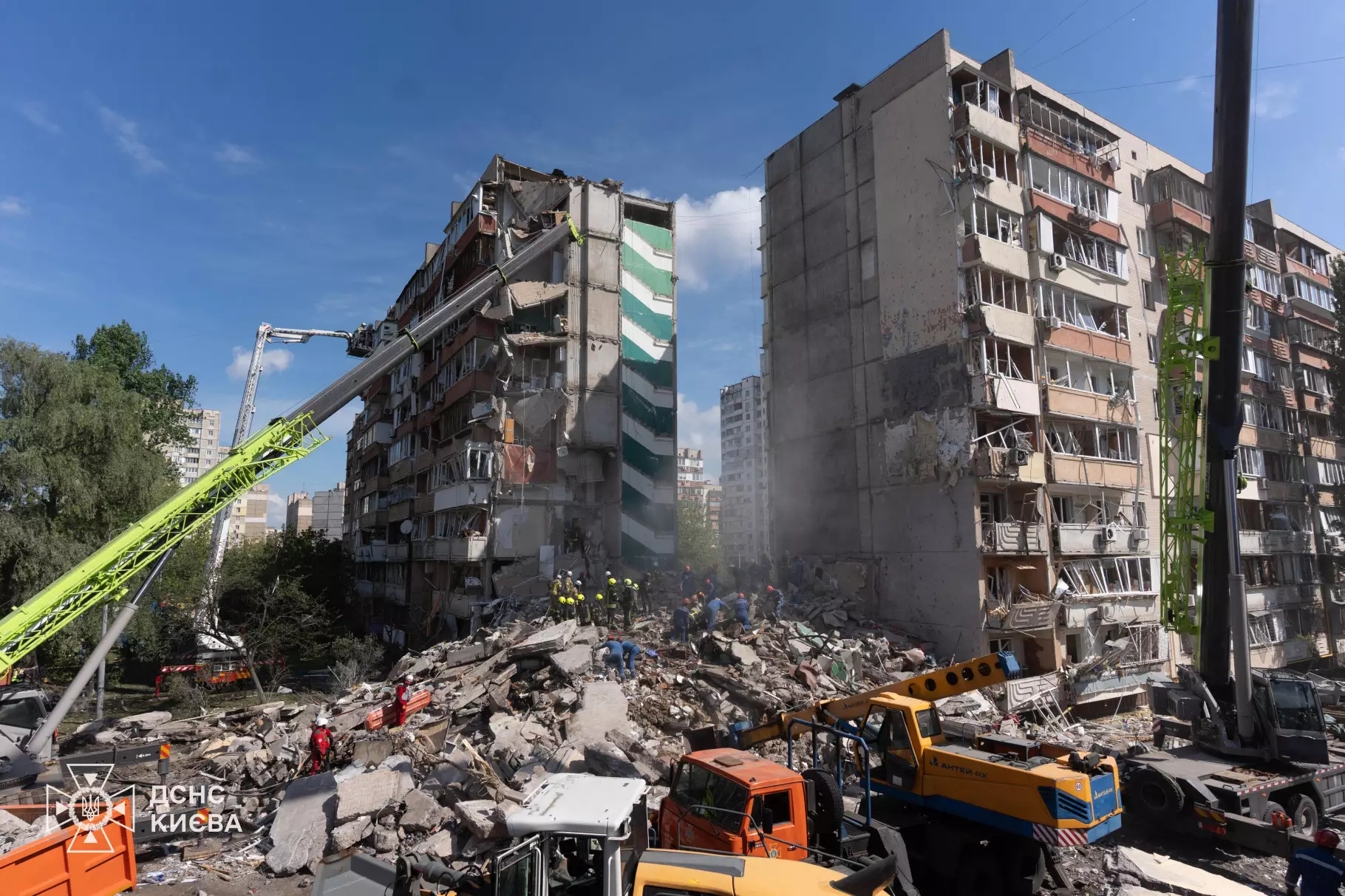

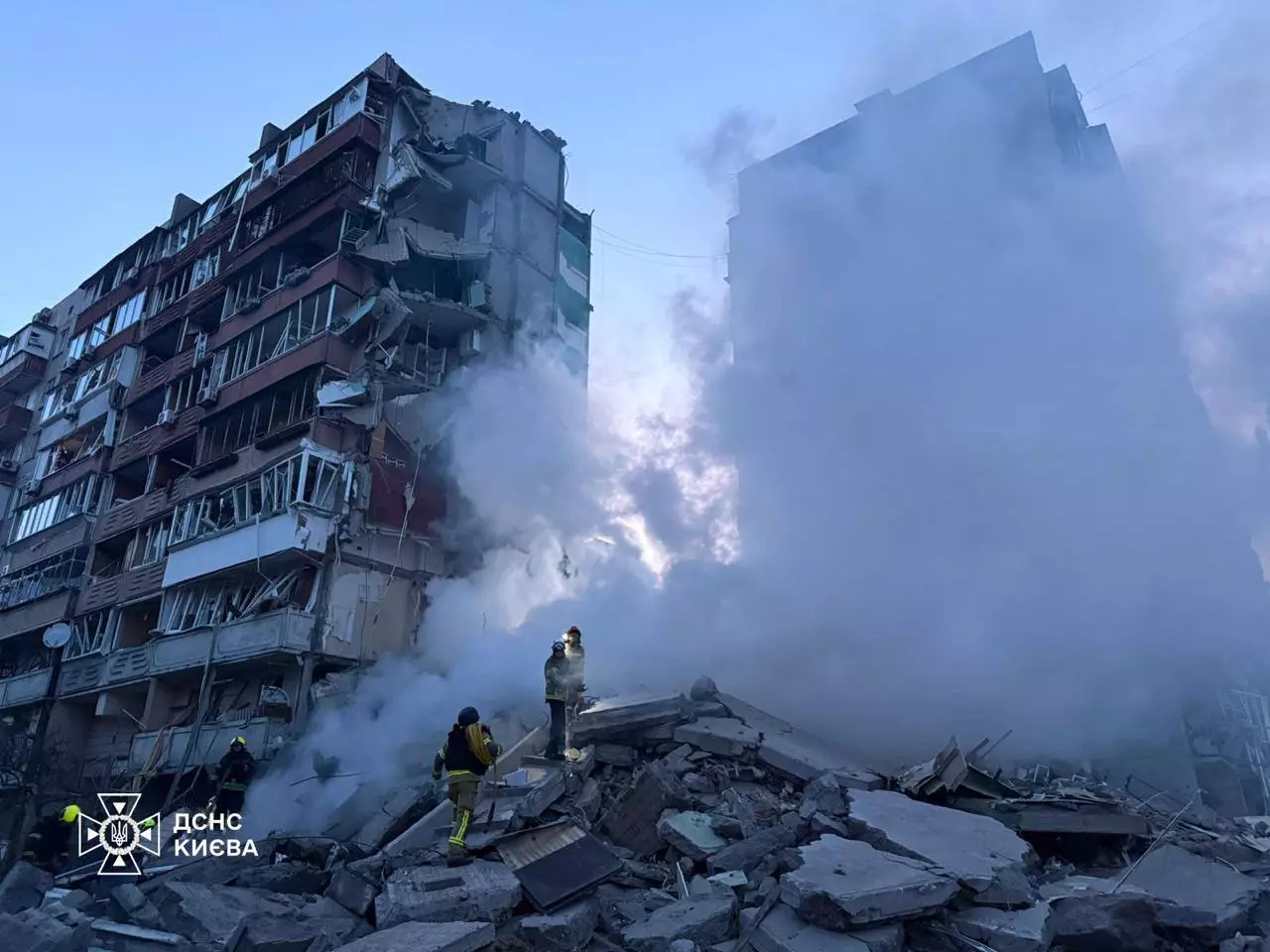

=== Kyiv ===
Kyiv suffered the most damage. In the Darnytskyi district, rescue workers carried out a search and rescue operation for over 24 hours following the collapse of a residential building.

As of 15 May, 24 people, including three children, were confirmed dead. A further 48 people, including a baby, were injured.

=== Other regions ===
In Kharkiv, Odesa and other cities, there have been reports of injuries and damage to residential buildings, energy facilities, and port and transport infrastructure. Power cuts have occurred in some regions.

== See also ==
- Kyiv strikes (2022–present)
- War crimes in the Russo-Ukrainian war (2022–present)
