= Donetsk fortress belt =

Defensive line of cities in Donetsk, Ukraine

Map of the Donbas war.

The Donetsk fortress belt refers to a region of populated urban areas along the H20 highway in Donetsk Oblast, Ukraine, containing the four cities: Sloviansk, Kramatorsk, Druzhkivka and Kostiantynivka. This network of cities has served a critical role to the Ukrainian defense of the region since the 2014 Donbas war and 2022 Russo-Ukraine war on the eastern front.

== Strategic importance ==
The strategic importance comes from the relatively raised elevation and steeper terrain of the area, allowing for the defender to have more reliable communications with drones. The attacker would have to navigate through this uneven terrain, allowing for an easier defense. Terrain west of the fortress belt is predominantly lowlands, which would — assuming the attacker captures the region — allow them to more easily utilize motorized vehicles for maneuver warfare, and allow infantry to have easier movement in the advancing direction. Drones would be able to better aid with the advance, due to the raised elevation.

== History ==
=== War in Donbas ===
During the 2014 Donbas War, the region became known as the fortress belt, it was briefly captured by pro-Russian separatists before it was returned to Ukrainian forces following the three month Siege of Sloviansk.

=== Russo-Ukrainian war (2022–present) ===
At the start of the Russo-Ukrainian war (2022–present), Russia captured territories to the north of the fortress belt, threatening encirclement of the region, before being repulsed from the region during the Kharkiv counteroffensive.

The regions to the south and east were subject to two years of fighting, notably Avdiivka, with the final major city located between the Donetsk People's Republic and the fortress cities falling on 7 August 2025. Putin demanded on the 21 August 2025, that as a prelude to peace negotiations, Ukraine would need to withdraw from the Donbas, including the cities that make up the fortress belt to commence peace negotiations.

In October 2025, a Russian infiltration on the south-eastern part of the city of Kostiantynivka occurred.

In June 2026, Russian forces began infiltrations into one of southernmost of the fortress belt cities, Kostiantynivka. Russian forces were also approaching Sloviansk and Kramatorsk, and engaging with frequent air and drone attacks.

In September 2026, Operation Vivaldi prevented Russian forces from encircling the fortress belt from the north via Lyman.
