= Groza (surname) =

Groza is a Romanian surname. Notable people with the surname include:

- Aleksander Groza (1807–1875), Polish poet and writer
- Alex Groza (1926–1995), American basketball player
- Ana Maria Groza (born 1976), Romanian racewalker
- Anca Groza (born 23 1956), Romanian swimmer
- Loredana Groza (born 1970), Romanian singer
- Lou Groza (1924–2000), American footballer, Hall of Fame placekicker for the Cleveland Browns
  - Lou Groza Award, annual college football award for best placekicker
- Petru Groza (1884–1958), Romanian politician
