= List of massacres in Ukraine =

This is a list of massacres that have occurred in the modern day areas of Ukraine.

== Massacres until 1939 ==
Name	Date	Location	Perpetrators	Deaths	Notes
Siege of Kyiv	November 28–December 6, 1240	Kyiv	Mongol Empire	48,000	The Mongols under Batu Khan cross the frozen Dnieper River and lay siege to the city of Kiev. On December 6, the walls are rendered rubble by Chinese catapults and the Mongols pour into the city. Brutal hand-to-hand street fighting occurs, the Kievans are eventually forced to fall back to the central parts of the city. Many people take refuge in the Church of the Blessed Virgin. As scores of terrified Kievans climb onto the Church's upper balcony to shield themselves from Mongol arrows, their collective weight strain its infrastructure, causing the roof to collapse and crush countless citizens under its weight. Of a total population of 50,000, 48,000 are massacred.
Khmelnytsky pogroms (Tach Vetat)	1648–1649	Nationwide	Cossacks	20,000–100,000 Jews	See Jewish casualties of Tach Vetat for discussion of various estimates of the number of murdered
Batih massacre	June 3–4, 1652	Batih	Cossacks	3,500–8,000 Polish POWs	Also known as the "Sarmatian Katyń"
Kaffa massacre	October 1667	Kaffa	Cossacks	2,000 Crimean Tatars	The city was sacked by the Cossacks, with 2,000 Crimean Tatars massacred, along with 1,500 Crimean Tatar women and children taken captive
Arbautuk massacre	October 1667	Arbautuk	Cossacks	Thousands of Crimean Tatars	
Sack of Baturyn	November 2, 1708	Baturyn	Russian Empire	~7,000-15,000 Ukrainians	After the capture of the city, its entire civil population was massacred by Russian forces
Executions of Cossacks in Lebedyn	1708-1709	Lebedyn	Russian Empire	900	Executions of pro-Swedish Cossacks who betrayed the oath of allegiance to the Russian Tsar
Koliivshchyna	6 June 1768 – June 1769	Right-bank Ukraine	Haidamaks	100,000 – 200,000 civilians	Pogroms against both real and imagined supporters of the Bar Confederation, particularly ethnic Poles, Jews, Roman Catholics, and especially Byzantine Catholic priests and laity
Massacre of Uman	June 1768	Uman	Ukrainian rebels	2,000–33,000 Jews and Poles	Massacre of the Jews, Poles and Ukrainian Uniates by haidamaks
Kiev pogrom (1881)	May 7, 1881	Kyiv		Unknown	
Odessa pogrom (1905)	October 18 and 22, 1905	Odesa	Ethnic Russian, Ukrainian, and Greek rioters	400–1,000 Jews	Between 18 and 22 October 1905, ethnic Russians, Ukrainians, and Greeks killed over 400 to 1.000 Jews and damaged or destroyed over 1600 Jewish properties.
Kiev pogrom (1905)	October 31–November 2, 1905	Kyiv	Ethnic Russian, Ukrainian, etc. rioters	100 Jews	
Pogroms of the Russian Civil War	1918–1923	Ukraine and Southern Russia	AFSR, White movement (17-50% of killings); Green armies Red Army (2-9% of killings); Ukrainian People's Army (25-54% of killings)	50,000–250,000 Jews	Including Jews who were massacred in Southern Russia
Lwów pogrom	21-23 November 1918	Lviv	Polish army	340 Jews and Ukrainians	
Fastiv massacre	September 1919	Fastiv	White Army	1,000–1,500 Jews	Pogrom against the Jewish population of city of Fastov by units of the White Army.
Eichenfeld massacre	November 1919	Eichenfeld, Katerynoslav	Revolutionary Insurgent Army of Ukraine	136 Mennonites	
Berdychiv massacre (1920)	7 June 1920	Berdychiv	(Russia) 1st Cavalry Army	Hundreds of wounded Polish and Ukrainian soldiers, Red Cross workers and nuns.	Victims were burned alive in a hospital.
Vinnytsia massacre	1937–1938	Vinnytsia	Soviet Union	9,432 Ukrainians and Poles	Part of the Great Purge.

== Massacres during World War II ==
Name	Date	Location	Perpetrators	Deaths	Notes
Katyn massacre	April–May 1940	Kharkiv, Kherson, Kyiv	Soviet Union	7,247 Poles	7,247 of the 22,000 victims of the massacre were murdered in the three Ukrainians cities.
Lunca massacre	February 7, 1941	Lunca	Soviet Union	Over 600	Massacre of Romanians
Fântâna Albă massacre	April 1, 1941	Fântâna Albă	Soviet Union	44 (Soviet & Russian claim); 3,000 (Romanian claim)	Massacre of Romanians
NKVD prisoner massacres in Ukraine	June–November 1941	In 78 prisons across Ukraine	Soviet Union	Almost 9,000	By Stalin's orders
Lviv pogroms (1941)	June 1941 – July 1941	Lviv	OUN-B, Einsatzgruppen, Ukrainian nationalists, local crowds	6,000 Jews	
Kamianets-Podilskyi massacre	August 27–28, 1941	Kamianets-Podilskyi	Nazi Germany; Ukrainian Auxiliary Police	23,600 Jews	
Pavoloch massacre	September 5, 1941	Pavoloch	Nazi Germany	1,500 Jews	
Nikolaev massacre	September 16–30, 1941	Mykolaiv	Nazi Germany	35,782 mostly Jews	
Babi Yar massacre	September 29–30, 1941	Babi Yar	Nazi Germany	33,771 Jews	
Berdychiv massacre (1941)	October 5, 1941	Berdychiv	Nazi Germany	20,000–38,536 Jews	
1941 Odessa massacre	October 22–24, 1941	Odesa	Nazi Germany; Kingdom of Romania local crowds	25,000–100,000 Jews	
Drobitsky Yar	December 15, 1941	Kharkiv	Nazi Germany	15,000 Jews	
Artemivsk massacre	January 11, 1942	Artemivsk (now Bakhmut)	Nazi Germany	1,317–3,000 Jews	
Sernyky massacre	1942	Sernyky	Nazi Germany	553 Jews	
Sarny massacre	August 27–28, 1942	Sarny	Nazi Germany	14,000–18,000 Jews	
Massacre of Grischino	February 1943	Pokrovsk	Soviet Union	596 POWs and prisoners	Massacre of Germans, Italians, Romanians, Ukrainians, Hungarians, and Danes.
Massacres of Poles in Volhynia and Eastern Galicia	March 1943 – December 1944	Volhynia	Ukrainian Insurgent Army	60,000–100,000 Poles	
Koriukivka massacre	March 1–2, 1943	Koriukivka	Nazi Germany; Kingdom of Hungary (1920–1946)	6,700	
Remel massacre	March 17, 1943	Remel	Schutzmannschaft Battalion 202	400	Revenge for Massacres of Poles in Volhynia and Eastern Galicia
Janowa Dolina massacre	April 23, 1943	Janowa Dolina	Ukrainian nationalists	600+ Poles	
Hurby massacre	June 2, 1943	Hurby	Ukrainian Insurgent Army	250 Poles	
Dominopol massacre	July 11, 1943	Dominopol	Ukrainian Insurgent Army	490 Poles	
Gurów massacre	July 11, 1943	Gurów	Ukrainian Insurgent Army	410 Poles	
Poryck massacre	July 11, 1943	Poryck	Ukrainian Insurgent Army	300 Poles	
Zagaje massacre	July 11–12, 1943	Zagaje	Ukrainian Insurgent Army	260–350 Poles	
Malin massacre	July 13, 1943	Malyn	Nazi Germany; Schutzmannschaft (disputed between Polish and Ukrainian)	532-850	In the massacre, approximately 374 Czechs,124 Ukrainians and 26 Poles were killed
Leonówka massacre	August 1-2, 1943	Leonówka, Tuchyn	Ukrainian Insurgent Army	190 Poles	
Budy Ossowskie massacre	August 29, 1943	Budy Ossowskie	Ukrainian Insurgent Army	290 Poles	
Głęboczyca massacre	August 29, 1943	Głęboczyca	Ukrainian Insurgent Army	250 Poles	
Teresin massacre	August 29, 1943	Teresin, Włodzimierz County	Ukrainian Insurgent Army	207 Poles	
Wola Ostrowiecka massacre	August 30, 1943	Wola Ostrowiecka	Ukrainian Insurgent Army	529 Poles	
Huta Pieniacka massacre	February 28, 1944	Huta Pieniacka	Ukrainian nationalists	500–1,200 Poles	
Chodaczków Wielki massacre	April 16, 1944	Chodaczków Wielki	14th Waffen Grenadier Division of the SS (1st Galician)	862 Poles	

== Massacres in the post-WWII period ==
Name	Date	Location	Perpetrators	Deaths	Notes
Kerch Polytechnic College massacre	October 17, 2018	Kerch, Crimea	Vladislav Roslyakov	21	School shooting and nail-bomb attack
Bucha massacre	March 2022	Bucha, Kyiv Oblast	Russia	73-178+ (UN)/ 458 (Ukraine)	Killing of Ukrainian civilians during the Russian occupation
Olenivka prison massacre	29 July 2022	Molodizhne, Donetsk Oblast	Russia	53–62 POWs	during the Russian invasion of Ukraine, a building housing Ukrainian prisoners of war in a Russian-operated prison in Molodizhne near Olenivka, Donetsk Oblast, was destroyed, killing 53 to 62 Ukrainian prisoners of war (POWs) and leaving 75 to 130 wounded.
Volnovakha massacre	27 October 2023	Volnovakha	Russia	9	including two children

== Other events ==
These events involving multiple deaths in Ukraine are not widely known, or recognized, as 'massacres'.

Other events involving multiple deaths in Ukraine
Name	Date	Location	Perpetrators	Deaths	Notes
Dnepropetrovsk maniacs	June 25-July 16, 2007	Dnipro	Viktor Sayenko, Igor Suprunyuk	21	Two 19-year old men killed 21 people.
Leskovitsa Killings	April 20–21, 2010	Chernihiv	Oleksandr Sergov	3	1 Wounded, A Neo-Nazi kills three people with a shovel in Chernihiv's Leskovitsa neighborhood.
Karavan shooting	September 26, 2012	Kyiv	Yaroslav Mazurok	3	The victims were four security guards of the vicinity; only one survived. The suspect was later found dead on November 7 that same year.
Trofimov Beheadings	December 15, 2012	Kharkiv	Unknown	4	The murder of judge Vladimir Trofimov and his relatives.
Revolution of Dignity	February 18–21, 2014	Kyiv	Government of Viktor Yanukovych (Berkut)	108	Including 2014 Hrushevskoho Street riots
2014 Odesa clashes	May 2, 2014	Odesa	Euromaidanites (and Anti-Maidanites)	48	Clashes between pro-Maidan protesters and anti-Maidan, pro-Russian protesters resulted in deaths of 48 people.
Murder of Pentecostals in Sloviansk	June 2014	Sloviansk	Russian Orthodox Army	4	
Malaysia Airlines Flight 17	July 17, 2014	Hrabove, Donetsk Oblast	Donetsk People's Republic	298	
Novosvitlivka refugee convoy attack	August 18, 2014	Novosvitlivka, Luhansk Oblast	Luhansk People's Republic	17	
Volnovakha bus attack	January 13, 2015	Volnovakha	Donetsk People's Republic	12	
Dnipro shooting	January 27, 2022	Dnipro	Artemiy Yuryovich Riabchuk	5	An additional 5 people were injured. The shooting occurred early in the morning.
Siege of Chernihiv	February 24–April 4, 2022	Chernihiv	Russia	≥700	
February 2022 Kharkiv cluster bombing	28 February 2022	Kharkiv	Russia	9	37 wounded, part of Battle of Kharkiv
Bombing of Borodianka	1-2 March 2022	Borondianka	Russia	>80	Part of Kyiv Offensive
Kharkiv government building airstrike	1 March 2022	Kharkiv	Russia	29	More than 35 injured; part of Battle of Kharkiv
Chernihiv bombing	March 3, 2022	Chernihiv	Russia	47	Part of Siege of Chernihiv
Irpin refugee column shelling	6 March 2022	Irpin	Russia	8	Part of Battle of Irpin
Mariupol hospital airstrike	9 March 2022	Mariupol	Russian Air Force	4 + 1 stillbirth	Part of Siege of Mariupol
Stara Krasnianka care house attack	11 March 2022	Luhansk Oblast	Russia-affiliated forces	56	
Mykolaiv cluster bombing	13 March 2022	Mykolaiv	Russia	9	Part of Battle of Mykolaiv
March 2022 Donetsk attack	March 14, 2022	Donetsk	Russia; Donetsk People's Republic	23	
Chernihiv breadline attack	March 16, 2022	Chernihiv	Russia	14	Part of Siege of Chernihiv
Mariupol theatre airstrike	March 16, 2022	Mariupol	Russia	12 (Amnesty International); 600 (AP)	Part of Siege of Mariupol
March 2022 Kharkiv cluster bombing	24 March 2022	Kharkiv	Russia	6	15 injured; part of Battle of Kharkiv
Mykolaiv government building airstrike	March 29, 2022	Mykolaiv	Russia	37	Part of Battle of Mykolaiv
Kramatorsk railway station attack	April 8, 2022	Kramatorsk, Donetsk Oblast	Russia	59	
April 2022 Kharkiv cluster bombing	22 April 2022	Kharkiv	Russia	9	Part of Battle of Kharkiv
Bilohorivka school bombing	May 7, 2022	Bilohorivka, Luhansk Oblast	Russia	2 (confirmed) 60 (claim)	
Maisky Market attack	13 June 2022	Donetsk	Russia	5	22 injured
2022 Kremenchuk missile strike	June 27, 2022	Kremenchuk, Poltava Oblast	Russia	21	Missile airstrike of Amstor mall
Serhiivka missile strike	1 July 2022	Serhiivka, Serhiivka settlement hromada, Bilhorod-Dnistrovskyi Raion, Odesa Oblast	Russia	21	38 injured
Kharkiv dormitories missile strike	17-18 August 2022	Kharkiv	Russia	25	44 injured; part of Battle of Kharkiv
Chaplyne railway station attack	24 August 2022	Chaplyne	Russia	25	31 injured
Izium mass graves	Discovered on 15 September 2022	Izium, Kharkiv Oblast	Russia; Russian Ground Forces	440+	
September 2022 Donetsk attack	19 September 2022	Donetsk	Armed Forces of Ukraine (Per Russia and DPR)	13	
Kupiansk civilian convoy shelling	25 September 2022	Kharkiv Oblast	Russia	26	Part of 2022 Kharkiv Counteroffensive
Zaporizhzhia civilian convoy attack	30 September 2022	Zaporizhzhia	Russia	32	
2022 Zaporizhzhia residential building airstrike	9 October 2022	Zaporizhzhia	Russia	13	More than 89 injured
2023 Dnipro residential building airstrike	14 January 2023	Dnipro	Russia	≥46	Victims include 6 children; 80 injured
April 2023 Sloviansk airstrike	14 April 2023	Sloviansk, Donetsk Oblast	Russia	15	24 injured; attack occurred on Eastern Orthodox Christian Good Friday
2023 Uman missile strike	28 April 2023	Uman	Russia	23	
Destruction of the Kakhovka Dam	6 June 2023	Kakhovka Hydroelectric Power Plant, Kherson Oblast	Russia	59-300	
2023 Kramatorsk restaurant missile strike	27 June 2023	Kramatorsk, Donetsk Oblast	Russia	13	Victims include 4 children.
Lyman cluster bombing	8 July 2023	Lyman	Russia	9	
August 2023 Chernihiv missile strike	19 August 2023	Chernihiv	Russia	7	More than 144 injured
Hroza missile attack	5 October 2023	Hroza, Kharkiv Oblast	Russia	59	
29 December 2023 Russian strikes on Ukraine	29 December 2023	Kyiv and other cities	Russia	58	
2024 Donetsk attack	21 January 2024	Donetsk	Ukraine (alleged, denied by Ukraine)	27	25 injured
2024 Lysychansk missile strike	3 February 2024	Russian occupied Lysychansk	Ukraine (Russian claim)	≥28 (Russian claim)	
15 March 2024 Odesa missile strikes	15 March 2024	Odesa	Russia	21	74 injured
22 March 2024 Russian strikes on Ukraine	22 March 2024	Kharkiv, Zaporizhzhia, Kryvyi Rih, Khmelnytskyi, Poltava Oblast, Vinnytsia Oblast, Lviv Oblast, Ivano-Frankivsk Oblast, Mykolaiv Oblast, Odesa Oblast, Sumy Oblast and other parts of Ukraine	Russia	5	
25 May 2024 Kharkiv missile strikes	25 May 2024	Kharkiv	Russia	19	65 injured, part of 2024 Kharkiv Offensive
8 July 2024 Russian strikes on Ukraine	8 July 2024	Kyiv, Kryvyi Rih, Dnipro, Pokrovsk, Kropyvnytskyi	Russia	≥47	Strikes damaged infrastructure including the Okhmatdyt children's hospital.
2024 Kostiantynivka supermarket strike	9 August 2024	Kostiantynivka	Russia	14	
September 2024 Poltava strike	3 September 2024	Poltava, Poltava Oblast	Russia	≥59	
17 November 2024 Russian strikes on Ukraine	17 November 2024	Regions across Ukraine	Russia	7	
2025 Sumy airstrike	13 April 2025	Sumy	Russia	36	
April 2025 Russian attack on Kyiv	24 April 2025	Kyiv	Russia	13	
2025 Yarova attack	9 September 2025	Yarova, Donetsk Oblast	Russia	25	19 injured
2025 Ovruch train attack	24 October 2025	Ovruch, Zhytomyr Oblast	Lone man from Kharkiv	5 (including the perpetrator)	casualties included 3 civilian women, 12 others injured
2025 Ternopil strike	19 November 2025	Ternopil	Russia	≥38	
2025 Khorly strike	31 December 2025 – 1 January 2026	Khorly, Kherson Oblast	Armed Forces of Ukraine (Per Russia)	29	
2026 Kyiv shooting	18 April 2026	Kyiv	Lone Russian-born Ukrainian	8 (including the perpetrator)	
2026 Starobilsk strike	22 May 2026	Starobilsk	Armed Forces of Ukraine (per BBC News Russian)	21	
14 May 2026 Russian strikes on Ukraine	14 May 2026	Regions across Ukraine	Russia	27	

== See also ==
- Holodomor
