= The Holocaust in Ukraine =

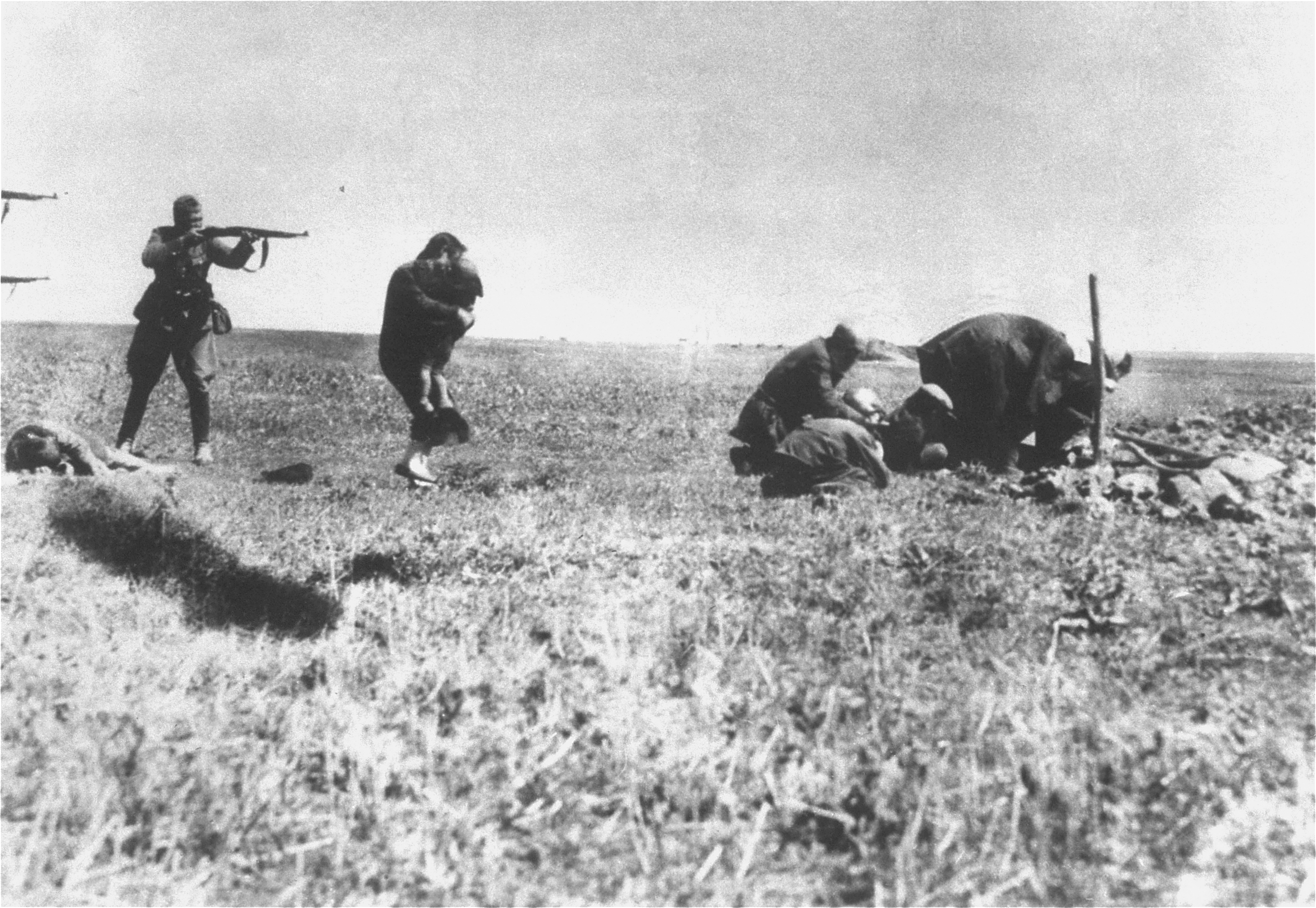
- SS paramilitaries murder Jewish civilians, including a mother and her child, in 1942, in Ivanhorod, Ukraine.
- Location: Ukrainian SSR
- Date: 22 June 1941 to 1944
- Incident type: Imprisonment, mass shootings, concentration camps, ghettos, forced labor, starvation, torture, mass kidnapping
- Perpetrators: Erich Koch, Friedrich Jeckeln, Otto Ohlendorf, Paul Blobel and many others. Various local Nazi collaborators, including Ukrainian Auxiliary Police, and the Organization of Ukrainian Nationalists
- Organizations: Einsatzgruppen, Order Police battalions, Axis occupation forces (Hungarians, Romanians), and local collaborators
- Victims: 850,000–1,600,000 Ukrainian Jews
- Memorials: In various places in the country

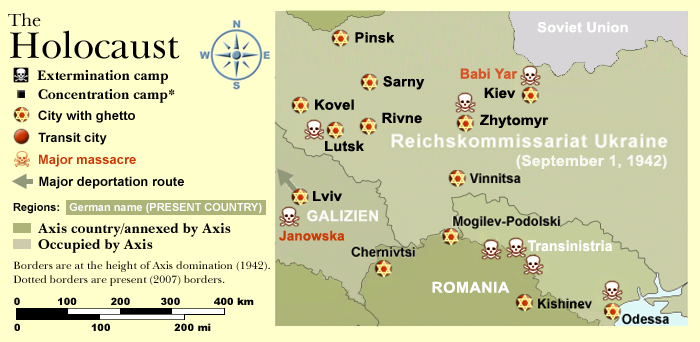
A map of the Holocaust in Ukraine.

The Holocaust saw the systematic mass murder of Jews in the Reichskommissariat Ukraine, the General Government, the Crimean General Government and some areas which were located to the east of Reichskommissariat Ukraine (all of those areas were under the military control of Nazi Germany), in the Transnistria Governorate and Bessarabia, Northern Bukovina and the Hertsa region (all of those areas were then part of Romania, with the latter three areas being re-annexed) and Carpathian Ruthenia (then part of Hungary) during World War II. The listed areas are currently parts of Ukraine (except modern-day Transnistria). (Note: Given the overlapping geographical scopes, see also The Holocaust in Poland (west), The Holocaust in Romania (southwest), The Holocaust in Belarus (north) and The Holocaust in Russia (east).)

Before the German invasion of the Soviet Union in June 1941, Ukraine was home to one of Europe's largest Jewish populations. During the Holocaust, at least 1.5 million Jews were murdered within the borders of present-day Ukraine. Most were shot near their homes by German forces and local collaborators rather than deported to extermination camps. The chances of survival varied depending on which occupying authority controlled an area and whether residents had been able to evacuate before the German advance.

Between 1941 and 1945, between 850,000 and 1,600,000 Jews were killed in Ukraine, which included assistance of local collaborators.

According to University of Toronto historian Timothy D. Snyder, "the Holocaust is integrally and organically connected to the Vernichtungskrieg, the war in 1941, and it is organically and integrally connected to the attempt to conquer Ukraine … Had Hitler not had the colonial idea to fight a war in Eastern Europe to control Ukraine, had there not been that idea, there could not have been a Holocaust." According to Wendy Lower, the genocide of the Ukrainian Jews was closely linked to German plans to exploit and colonize Ukraine.

== Background and Jewish population before 1941 ==
Jewish communities had lived in the territory of present-day Ukraine for centuries. Before World War II, Ukraine was home to one of Europe's largest Jewish populations, with Jewish communities in major cities such as Kyiv, Odesa, and Lviv, as well as in hundreds of smaller towns. Jews played an important role in local trade, education, and cultural life, with Yiddish widely spoken.

Under Soviet rule, Jewish religious and cultural institutions faced increasing restrictions. Between 1939 and 1941, Soviet territorial expansion brought additional Jewish communities under Soviet control. By 1941, the Jewish population of the Ukrainian Soviet Socialist Republic had reached approximately 2.45 million. When Germany invaded the Soviet Union in June 1941, some Jews managed to evacuate eastward, but many remained in areas that soon came under German and Romanian occupation.

== German occupation policy ==
Nazis viewed themselves as "civilizers" similar to the British Empire, while regarding Ukrainians and Jews as racially inferior. Jews were marked for total extermination, while Ukrainians were intended to serve as an exploited labor force, deprived of education, healthcare, adequate food, and eventually displaced or allowed to die out. Unlike in Western Europe where Jews were deported to extermination camps, the Holocaust in Ukraine was predominantly localized. The Einsatzgruppen (mobile killing squads), supported by Order Police battalions and local Ukrainian auxiliaries, systematically rounded up and shot Jews near their home towns and villages.

== Death squads (1941–1943 ==
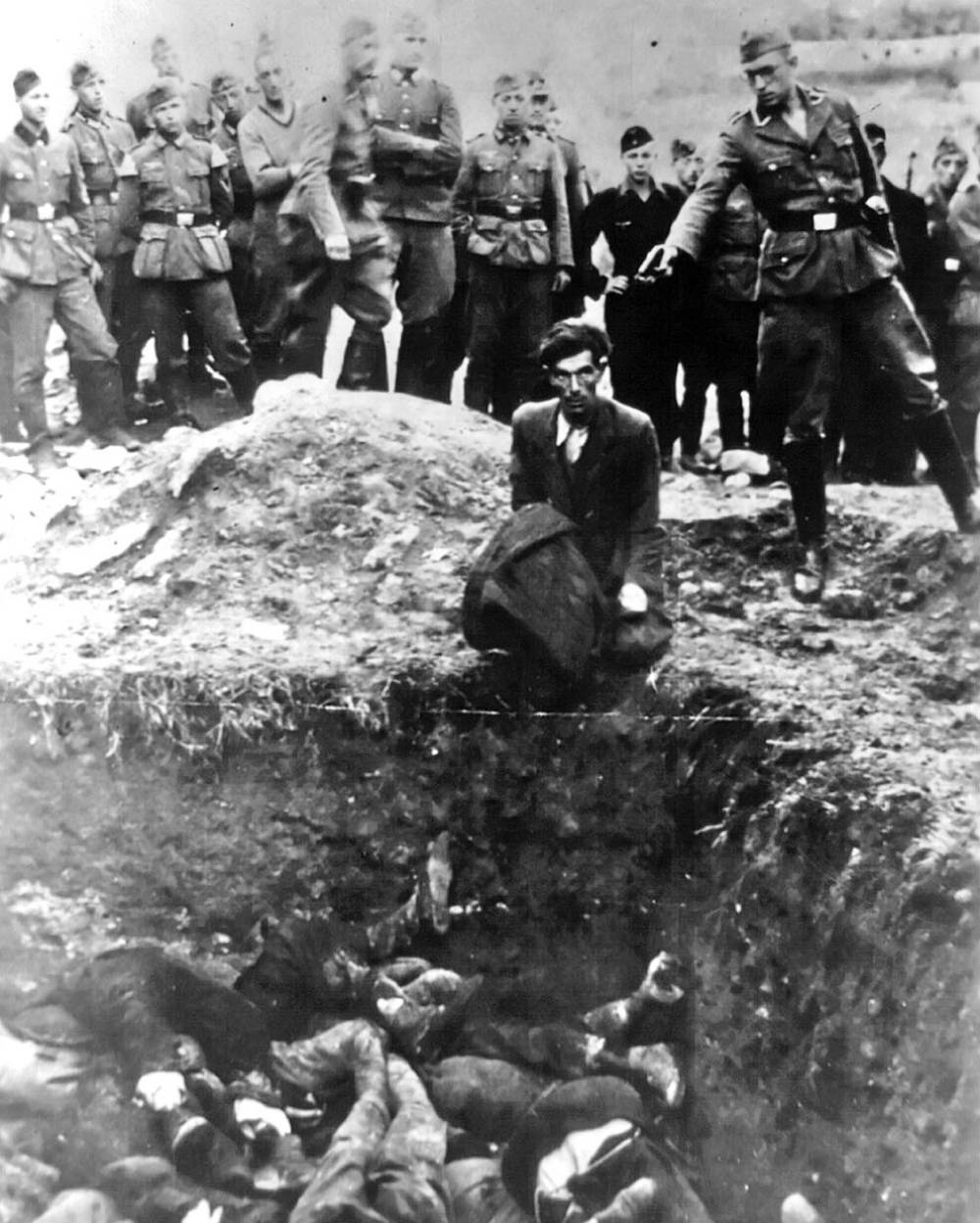
The Last Jew in Vinnitsa, the 1942 photograph showing a Jewish man near the town of Vinnytsia about to be shot dead by a member of Einsatzgruppe D. Also present are members of the German Army and the German Labor Service.

Total civilian losses during the war and the German occupation of Ukraine are estimated to number four million, including up to a million Jews who were murdered by Einsatzgruppen units, Order Police battalions, Wehrmacht troops and local Nazi collaborators. Einsatzgruppe C (Otto Rasch) was assigned to north and central Ukraine, and Einsatzgruppe D (Otto Ohlendorf) to Moldavia, south Ukraine, the Crimea, and, during 1942, the north Caucasus. According to Ohlendorf's testimony at the Einsatzgruppen Trial, "the Einsatzgruppen had the mission to protect the rear of the troops by killing the Jews, Romani, Communist functionaries, active Communists, uncooperative Slavs, and all persons who would endanger the security." In practice, their victims were nearly all Jewish civilians (no Einsatzgruppe member was killed in action during these operations). The United States Holocaust Memorial Museum tells the story of one survivor of the Einsatzgruppen in Piryatin, Ukraine, when they killed 1,600 Jews on 6 April 1942, the second day of Passover,

I saw them do the killing. At 5:00 p.m. they gave the command, "Fill in the pits". Screams and groans were coming from the pits. Suddenly I saw my neighbor Ruderman rise from under the soil … His eyes were bloody and he was screaming: "Finish me off!" … A murdered woman lay at my feet. A boy of five years crawled out from under her body and began to scream desperately. "Mommy!" That was all I saw, since I fell unconscious.

From 16 to 30 September 1941 the Nikolaev massacre in and around the city of Mykolaiv resulted in the deaths of 35,782 Soviet citizens, most of whom were Jews, as was reported to Hitler.

Jews of the city of Kiev and vicinity! On Monday, September 29, you are to appear by 08:00 a.m. with your possessions, money, documents, valuables, and warm clothing at Dorogozhitskaya Street, next to the Jewish cemetery. Failure to appear is punishable by death.

— Order posted in Kiev in Russian and Ukrainian on or around September 26, 1941.

The most notorious massacre of Jews in Ukraine was at the Babi Yar ravine outside Kiev, where 33,771 Jews were killed in an operation on 29–30 September 1941; some 100,000–150,000 Ukrainian and other Soviet citizens were also killed in the following weeks. The mass killing was approved by the military governor Major-General Kurt Eberhard, the Police Commander for Army Group South (SS-Obergruppenführer Friedrich Jeckeln), and the Einsatzgruppe C Commander Otto Rasch. It was carried out by SS, SD and Security Police. On Monday, 29 September, the Jews of Kiev gathered by the cemetery, expecting to be loaded onto trains. The crowd was large enough that most of the men, women, and children could not have known what was happening until it was too late: by the time they heard the machine-gun fire, there was no chance to escape. All were driven down a corridor of soldiers, in groups of ten. A truck driver described the scene,

[O]ne after the other, they had to remove their luggage, then their coats, shoes, and overgarments and also underwear … Once undressed, they were led into the ravine which was about 150 meters long and 30 meters wide and a good 15 meters deep … When they reached the bottom of the ravine they were seized by members of the Schutzmannschaft and made to lie down on top of Jews who had already been shot … The corpses were literally in layers. A police marksman came along and shot each Jew in the neck with a submachine gun … I saw these marksmen stand on layers of corpses and shoot one after the other … The marksman would walk across the bodies of the executed Jews to the next Jew, who had meanwhile lain down, and shoot him.

== The Holocaust under Romanian occupation ==
During World War II, parts of southern Ukraine came under Romanian control. Romania, an ally of Nazi Germany, administered the territory between the Dniester and Southern Bug rivers as the Transnistria Governorate from 1941 to 1944. The region included Odesa and parts of what is now southwestern Ukraine and Moldova.

Romanian authorities carried out mass killings of Jews and deported tens of thousands more from Bessarabia and Northern Bukovina to Transnistria. Jews already living in the region were also subjected to persecution. Many were forced into overcrowded ghettos and camps, where they faced hunger, disease, forced labor, and harsh living conditions. Thousands died from these conditions, while others were murdered in mass shootings.

Some of the largest massacres took place in Odesa and at the Bogdanovka camp. After Romanian forces occupied Odesa in October 1941, tens of thousands of Jews were killed in the city and its surrounding areas. Others were deported to camps and villages farther inland, where many were subsequently murdered.

According to the United States Holocaust Memorial Museum, an estimated 280,000 to 380,000 Jews were murdered in the Transnistria Governorate during Romanian occupation. Romanian authorities and local auxiliary forces were the principal perpetrators, although German units and local ethnic German militias also participated in the killings.

== Collaboration in Ukraine ==
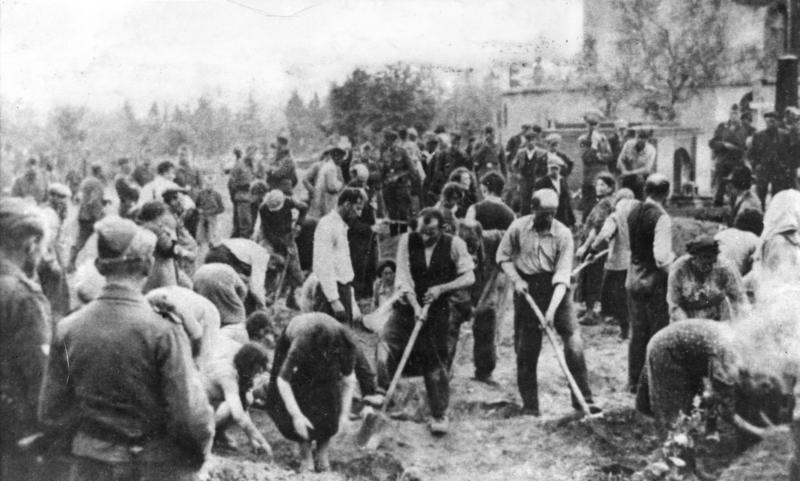
Jews digging their own graves. Storow, 4 July 1941.

Ukrainians who collaborated with Nazi Germany did so in various ways, including participating in the local administration, in German-supervised auxiliary police, Schutzmannschaft, in the German military, and serving as concentration camp guards. The National Geographic reported:

A number of Ukrainians had collaborated: According to German historian Dieter Pohl, around 100,000 joined police units that provided key assistance to the Nazis. Many others staffed the local bureaucracies or lent a helping hand during mass shootings of Jews. Ukrainians, such as the infamous Ivan the Terrible of Treblinka, were also among the guards who manned the Nazi death camps.

Timothy Snyder notes that, "the majority, probably the vast majority of people who collaborated with the German occupation were not politically motivated. They were collaborating with an occupation that was there, and which is a German historical responsibility."

Widespread coordination between the Third Reich and Ukrainian nationalists, Ukrainian militia and rank-and-file pogromists occurred. Prior to the German invasion of Ukraine, the two active Organization of Ukrainian Nationalists (OUN) factions coordinated directly from their headquarters in Berlin and Krakow. The headquarters decided to create marching companies ("pohidni groopi") to accompany the German invasion of Ukraine, recruiting new members into their ranks. The OUN supported Nazi antisemitic policies. In 1941, when German official Reinhard Heydrich requested "self-cleansing actions" in June of that year the OUN organized militias who killed several thousand Jews in western Ukraine soon afterward that year. The Ukrainian People's Militia under the OUN's command led pogroms that resulted in the massacre of 6,000 Jews in Lviv soon after that city's fall to German forces.

OUN members spread propaganda urging people to engage in pogroms. A slogan put forth by the Bandera group and recorded in the 16 July 1941 Einsatzgruppen report stated: "Long live Ukraine without Jews, Poles and Germans; Poles behind the river San, Germans to Berlin, and Jews to the gallows".In instructions to its members concerning how the OUN should behave during the war, it declared that "in times of chaos... one can allow oneself to liquidate Polish, Russian and Jewish figures, particularly the servants of Bolshevik-Muscovite imperialism" and further, when speaking of Russians, Poles, and Jews, to "destroy in struggle, particularly those opposing the regime, by means of: deporting them to their own lands, eradicating their intelligentsia, which is not to be admitted to any governmental positions, and overall preventing any creation of this intelligentsia (e.g. access to education etc.)... Jews are to be isolated, removed from governmental positions in order to prevent sabotage... Those who are deemed necessary may only work under strict supervision and removed from their positions for slightest misconduct... Jewish assimilation is not possible."

According to political scientist Ivan Katchanovski, the agreement between Ukrainian nationalists and the occupying authorities in the region was not limited to ideology, as 63% of Ukrainian Insurgeny Army (UPA) commanders by early 1944 were represented by former commanders of police formations created by Nazi Germany during the initial stage of the occupation of Ukraine. Police units and civil militia established by the Nazi authorities played the role of collaborators of the Nazis, participating not only in the genocide of the Jewish population but also in the killing of Soviet prisoners, as well as in the murder of Ukrainian civilians, such as the killing of 3,000 people in the village of Kortelitsa in September 1942.

Ukrainian police auxiliaries "had been involved at least in preparations for the Babi Yar massacre."

According to the Israeli Holocaust historian Yitzhak Arad, "In January 1942 a company of Tatar volunteers was established in Simferopol under the command of Einsatzgruppe 11. This company participated in anti-Jewish manhunts and murder actions in the rural regions."

According to The Simon Wiesenthal Center (in January 2011), "Ukraine has, to the best of our knowledge, never conducted a single investigation of a local Nazi war criminal, let alone prosecuted a Holocaust perpetrator." There had been many prosecutions in the past, but all of these trials were conducted by Soviet military and Ukrainian SSR courts, and never by Ukraine after the collapse of the Soviet Union.

== Victims ==
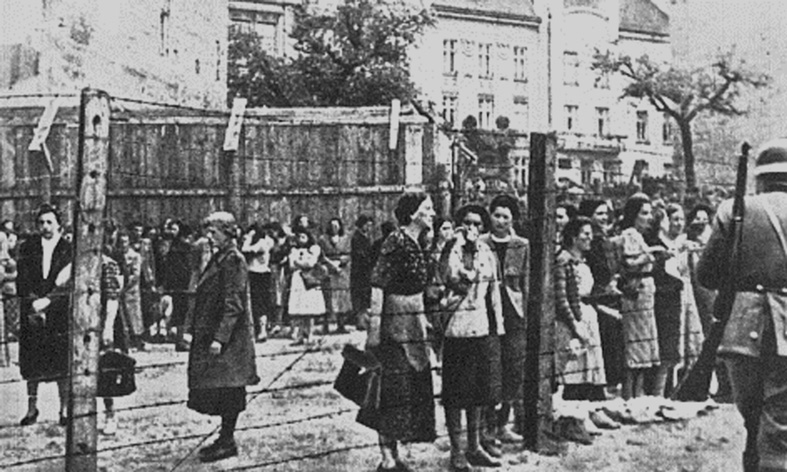
In the Prison on Łącki Street courtyard.

According to Timothy D. Snyder, at least 1.7 million Soviet Jews were killed by Germans and their collaborators by the end of 1942, "and the Soviet Jewish populations under their control had ceased to exist." Until the fall of the Soviet Union, it was believed that about 900,000 Jews were murdered as part of the Holocaust in Ukraine. This estimate is found in renowned and respected works such as The Destruction of the European Jews by Raul Hilberg. In the late 1990s, access to Soviet archives increased the estimates of the prewar population of Jews and as a result, the estimates of the death toll have been increasing.

In the 1990s, Dieter Pohl estimated that 1.2 million Jews were murdered, and more recent estimates of the death toll have been as high as 1.6 million. Some of those Jews whose names have been added to the death toll attempted to find refuge in the forest, but later on, during the German retreat, they were killed by members of the Ukrainian Insurgent Army, members of some nationalist units of the Home Army, or members of other partisan groups. According to American historian Wendy Lower, "there were many perpetrators, albeit with different political agendas, who killed Jews and suppressed this history". Yad Vashem research maintains that between 1 and 1.1 million Soviet Jews were murdered during the Holocaust, of them around 225,000 were from Belarus.

== Resistance ==
Jewish resistance in Ukraine took several distinct forms:

- Armed Uprisings: In ghettos across Ukraine, underground groups fought back. A notable uprising occurred in the Tuchyn Ghetto (Volhynia) in September 1942, where residents organized an armed rebellion, set fire to the ghetto, and allowed 2,000 Jews to escape.
- Partisan Warfare: Jews fled to the forests to fight as partisans. In the Vinnitsa region, independent Jewish partisan units were successfully established.
- Family Camps: Jews formed "family camps" deep in the woods. Non-combatants survived under the protection of armed Jewish fighters in forest-based communities.

== Execution units ==
- Einsatzgruppen C & D (Einsatzkommando)
- Order Police battalions
- Abwehr/Brandenburg special saboteur unit Nachtigall Battalion
- Freiwilligen-Stamm-Regiment 3 & 4 (Russians & Ukrainians)
- Ukrainian auxiliary units Schutzmannschaft as well as Ukrainische Hilfspolizei

== Notable survivors ==
Notable survivors of the Holocaust in Ukraine include globally recognized scholars, public figures, Nazi hunters, and individuals whose stories have drawn renewed global attention due to recent events.

Public Figures & Scholars:

- Roald Hoffmann
- Mordechai Rokeach
- Mina Rosner
- Adam Daniel Rotfeld
- Shevah Weiss
- Simon Wiesenthal

Tragically, several Ukrainian Holocaust survivors have made global headlines following recent wars and terrorist attacks:

- Vanda Semyonovna Obiedkova
- Boris Romanchenko
- Ludmila Lipovsky

== Rescuers ==
Ukraine rates fourth in the number of people recognized as "Righteous Among the Nations" for saving Jews during the Holocaust, with 2,673 individuals recognized as of December 2024.

The Shtundists, an evangelical Protestant denomination which emerged in late 19th century Ukraine, helped hide Jews.

== Ghettos ==
Nazi Germany and its Axis allies (primarily Romania) established multiple Jewish ghettos across occupied Ukraine. Unlike the multi-year confinement seen in Poland, most ghettos in Ukraine were functioned as short-term consolidation traps where inhabitants were held before being marched out and shot.

List of ghettos:

- Borshchiv
- Brailiv
- Brody
- Buchach
- Chortkiv
- Drohobycz
- Gritsev
- Kalynovka
- Kazatin
- Kolomyia
- Kostopil
- Kovel
- Litin
- Liubar
- Lwów
- Lutsk
- Mizoch
- Novaia Odessa
- Olyka
- Rovno
- Ruzhin
- Sambor
- Samgorodok
- Sarny
- Sharhorod
- Sokolovka
- Stanisławów
- Stryi
- Tal’noe
- Tarashcha
- Tarnopol
- Trochenbrod
- Vinnitsa

== Concentration camps ==
Nazi Germany established concentration camps on Ukrainian soil, though the vast majority of Holocaust victims in Ukraine were murdered in mass shooting actions rather than in industrial gas chambers.

- Bogdanovka
- Pechora
- Syrets
- Vapniarka
- Janowska

== Massacres ==
The “Holocaust by bullets” refers to the systematic, mass shooting of an estimated 1.5 million Jewish people between 1941 and 1944. This genocide represented the critical first phase of the Holocaust in Eastern Europe, occurring in broad daylight, near the victims' homes, and completely bypassing the industrialized gas chambers of later concentration camps.

Unlike the hidden, bureaucratic slaughter at death camps like Birkenau or Treblinka, this phase was an intimate and highly public form of mass murder. Mass executions took place in virtually every town and village in Ukraine with a Jewish population.

- 1941 Bila Tserkva massacre
- 1941 Odessa massacre
- Artemivsk massacre
- Berdychiv
- Boryslav
- Babi Yar
- Buchach
- Dnipropetrovsk
- Drobytsky Yar
- Druzhkivka
- Feodosiya
- Holoby and Melnytsia
- Ivano-Frankovsk
- Kamenets-Podolskiy massacre
- Klevan
- Kovel
- Kremenets
- Kysylyn
- Lviv pogroms (1941)
- Massacre of Lwów professors
- Mezhirichi
- Mizoch
- Nikolaev massacre
- Niezwiska
- Odessa
- Olyka
- Ostrozhets
- Pliskov
- Raihorod and Sobolivka
- Ratne
- Rava-Ruska
- Sambir
- Sarny massacre
- Terebovl
- Ternopil
- Zhytomyr
- Zolochiv

== Postwar remembrance ==
After World War II, the Holocaust in Ukraine was rarely commemorated as a distinct tragedy under Soviet rule. Official memorials generally described those murdered by the Nazis as "peaceful Soviet citizens" without identifying Jewish victims separately. Although Jewish survivors and local communities tried to preserve the memory of those who had been killed, their efforts often faced restrictions from Soviet authorities.

One of the best-known examples was Babyn Yar in Kyiv, where more than 33,000 Jews were murdered over two days in September 1941. For decades, the site had no official memorial. A monument was finally erected in 1976, but its inscription did not specifically mention Jewish victims. In 1991, around the time of Ukraine's independence, a menorah-shaped memorial was dedicated to the Jews murdered there.

Ukraine's independence in 1991 opened new opportunities for Holocaust research and commemoration. Historians gained greater access to previously restricted Soviet archives, allowing them to investigate mass killings, local collaboration, and the experiences of Jewish communities during the occupation. Memorials were established or expanded at former killing sites, including in Odesa and the surrounding region.

Research into the Holocaust in Ukraine continues today. Historians and institutions such as the United States Holocaust Memorial Museum have collected archival documents, survivor testimonies, and other records to reconstruct the history of communities that were largely destroyed during the war.

== See also ==
- Gas van
- German war crimes
- Hegewald, a short-lived German colony near Zhytomyr
- History of the Jews in the Soviet Union
- History of the Jews in Ukraine
- History of the Jews in Transnistria
- The Holocaust in the Soviet Union
- No Place on Earth, a 2012 documentary film about a group of Ukrainian Jews who survived the Holocaust by hiding in the Verteba and Priest's Grotto caves
- World War II casualties of the Soviet Union
