= Leonówka massacre =

Massacre in Leonówka
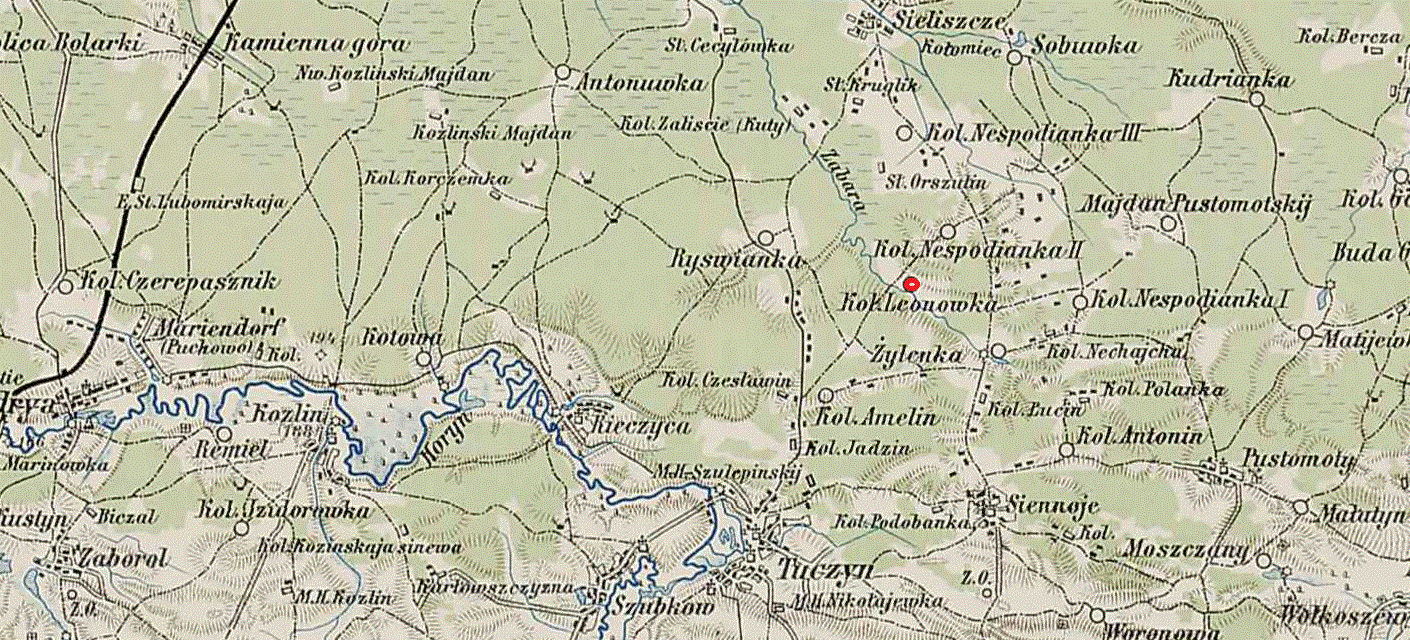
- Location of Leonówka on an Austro-Hungarian military map from around 1910
- Location: 50°45′25.8″N 26°37′5.2″E; Leonówka, Volhynian Voivodeship, (occupied Poland–Reichskommissariat Ukraine)
- Date: 1-3 August 1943
- Attack type: Shooting and stabbing, massacre part of Volyn genocide
- Weapons: Rifles, grenades, bayonets, axes, bludgeons and pitchforks
- Deaths: approximately 190
- Perpetrator: Ukrainian Insurgent Army
- Motive: Anti-Catholicism, Anti-Polish sentiment, Ukrainian nationalism, Genocidal intent

In early August 1943, the Ukrainian Insurgent Army killed approximately 190 Polish people in Leonówka, a colony in Tuchyn, Rovensky Uyezd, Wołyń Voivodeship, as part of the larger campaign of massacres of Poles in Volhynia and Eastern Galicia, considered as a genocide.

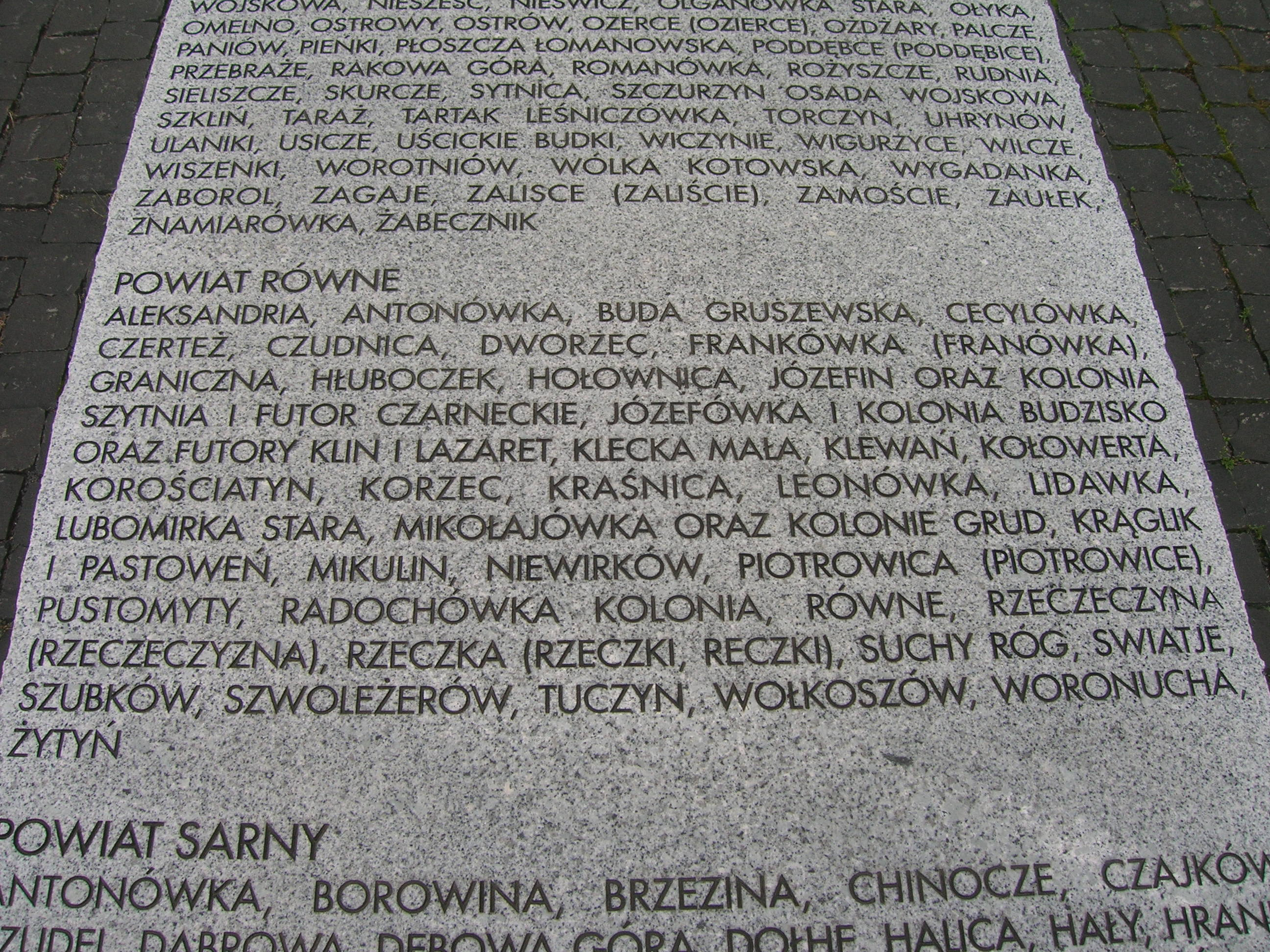
Leonówka on the plaque of the Monument to the Volhynian Massacre in Warsaw

On the night of August 1-2, 1943, Leonówka, which was home to about 300 Poles and several Ukrainian families, was surrounded by a 100-strong UPA unit arriving from the village of Żelanka. The UPA insurgents threw grenades into houses, entered homes, and murdered their inhabitants. Those who tried to flee were shot; all buildings were set on fire. It is estimated that about 150 people were killed. Around 2 a.m., the Ukrainian unit left the burned-down village.

On August 2 or 3, 1943, a group of UPA insurgents on horseback stopped Polish refugees from the village of Kudranka passing through Leonówka. The Poles were robbed of their belongings, taken to a nearby forest, and murdered there. 42 people were killed.

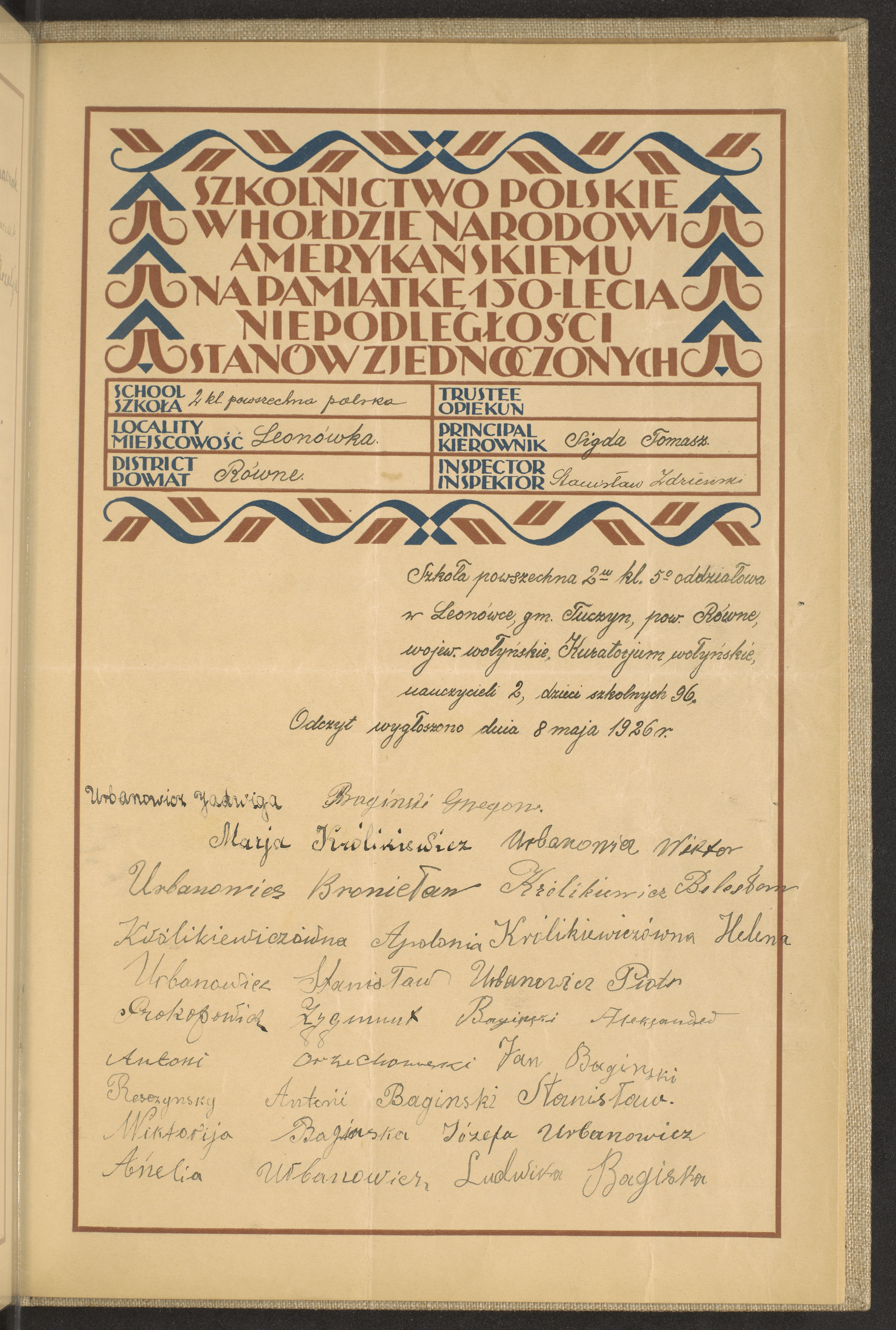
Leonowka Signatures 1926 p2

Citizens of the village Leonowka were likely last documented in 1926 in a 'Birthday Card' sent to America from Poland.

This has the historical value of a census.
