= Drobytsky Yar =

Ravine and Holocaust site in Kharkiv, Ukraine

Coordinates: 49°56′5.23″N 36°26′55.36″E

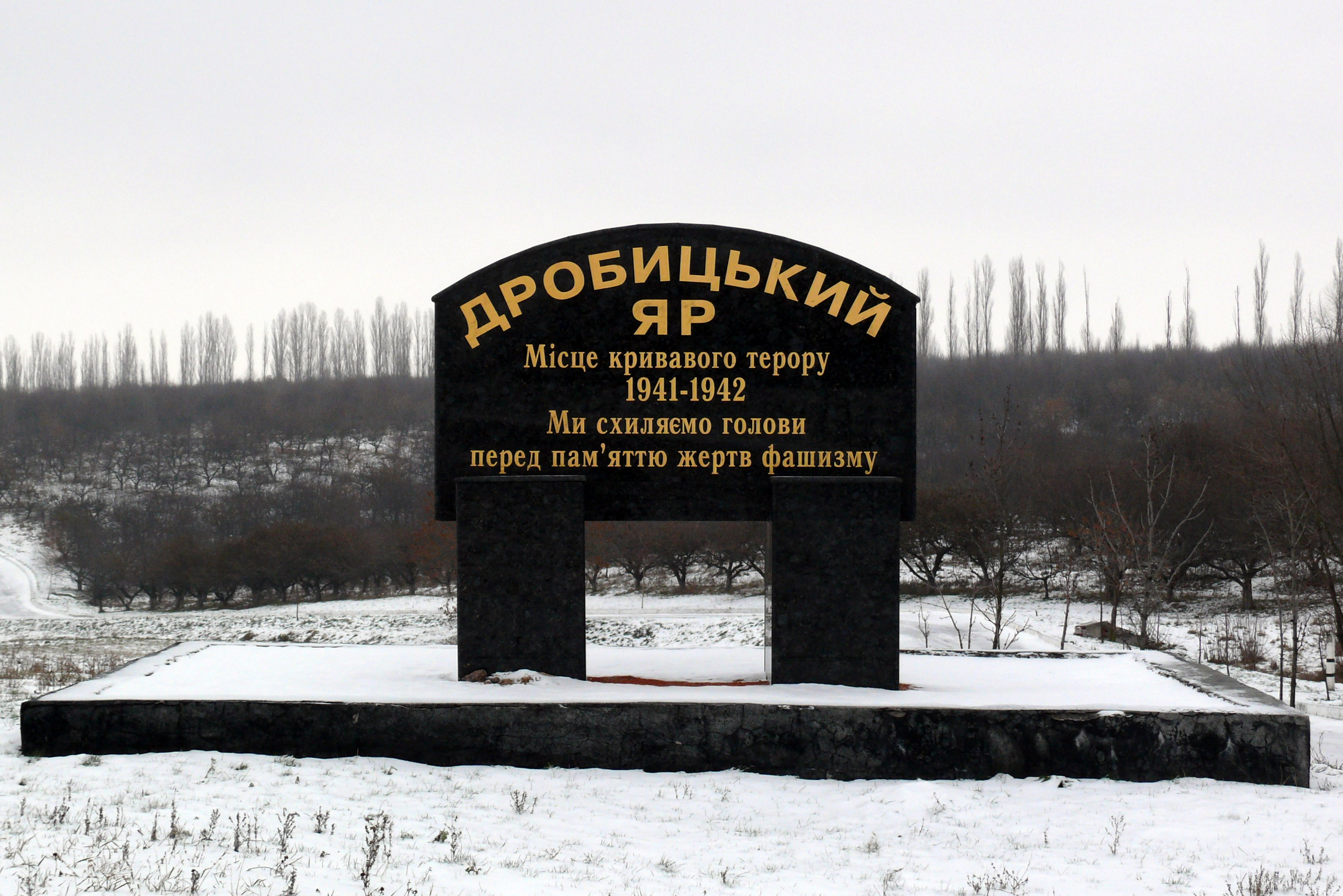
- Memorial entrance sign
- Location: Kharkiv, Ukraine
- Incident type: Mass murder
- Victims: 16,000–30,000 civilians

Immovable Monument of Local Significance of Ukraine
- Official name: Меморіальний комплекс «Дробицький Яр» (Drobytskyi Yar memorial complex)
- Type: History, Monumental Art
- Reference no.: 2656-Ха

Drobytsky Yar is a ravine in Kharkiv, Ukraine and the site of Nazi massacres during the Holocaust in Ukraine. Starting in October 1941, Nazi troops occupied Kharkiv and began preparations for the mass-murder of the local population. Over the following months, members of the Einsatzgruppen murdered an estimated 16,000–30,000 local residents, mainly Jews. Notably on 15 December 1941, when the temperature was −15 °C (5 °F), around 15,000 Jews were shot. Children were thrown into pits alive, to save bullets, in the expectation that they would quickly freeze to death. On 26 March 2022, the site's menorah monument was damaged by Russian artillery shelling during the invasion of Ukraine.

== Memorial ==
In the beginning of the 1990s, a competition was held for the best design of the memorial to immortalize the thousands of citizens murdered by the Nazis. Twenty-nine designs were submitted. The winner was the architect A. Leibfreid. The construction of the complex lasted several years however it was suspended due to the lack of funds.

At a meeting in late August 2001, the Kharkiv Oblast administration decided to resume the construction of the memorial. The oblast authorities supervised the construction process. The Cabinet of Ministers of Ukraine allotted 600,000 hryvnias for the construction. Contributions have also been made by city and oblast administrations, as well as by sponsors.

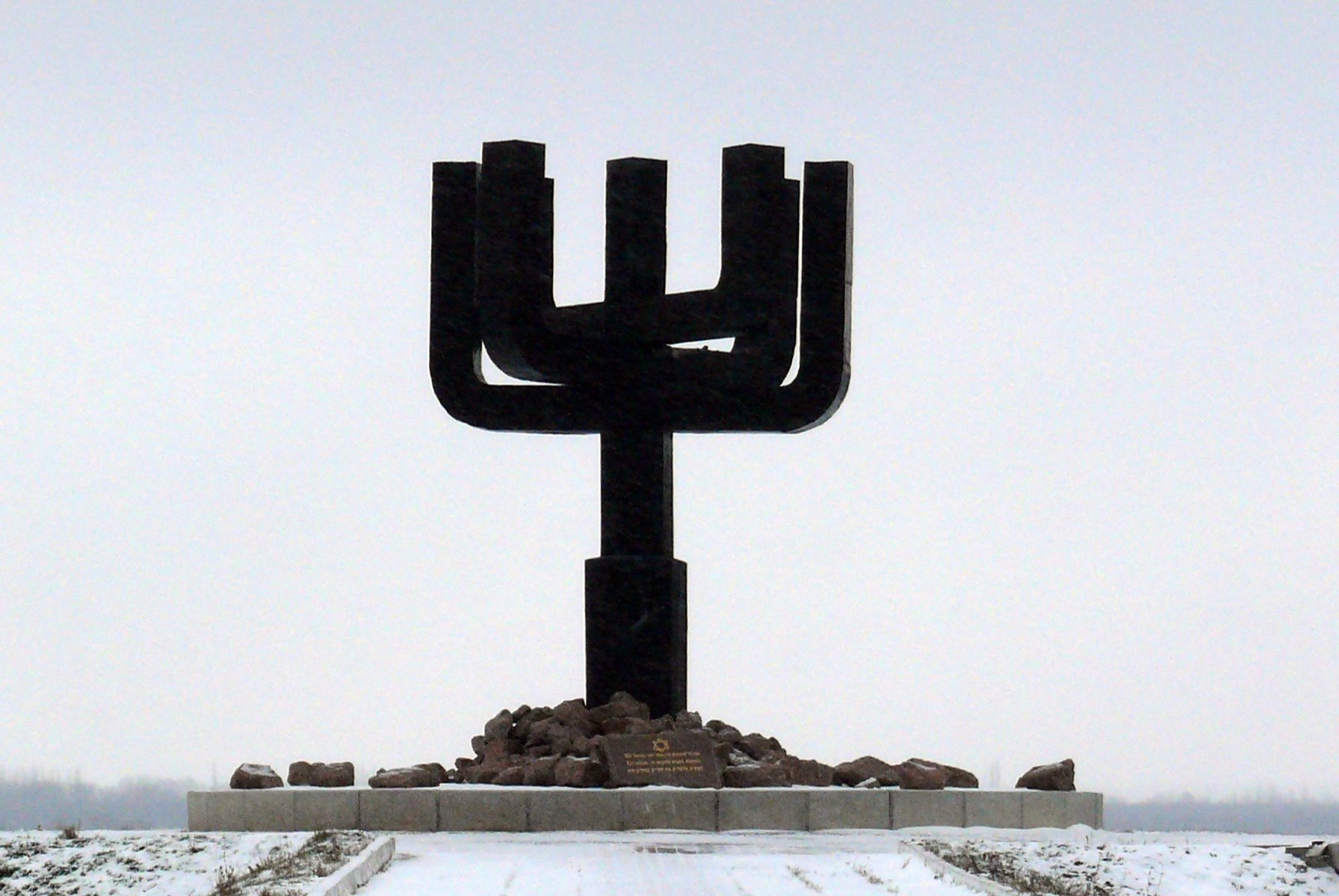
The Drobytsky Menorah, which was smashed by Russian military forces in March 2022

On 13 December 2002 the President of Ukraine, Leonid Kuchma, opened the memorial.

The main part of the memorial is a monument symbolizing a synagogue, with the Ten Commandments between its columns; most notably: "Do not kill". The memorial begins with a monument stylized under a Jewish menorah. A road leads from a black menorah to a white main building of the complex. Thousands of Kharkiv Jews took their last steps along it in 1941/1942. These dates are found on the wall of the main arched building. Underground is a hall of memory; the wall will bear the names of known victims.

The site includes two burials area. One trench is 100 m long and the other is 60 m. The Kharkiv archives contain data on fifteen thousand victims. However, the "Drobytsky Yar" foundation considers the number of victims to be closer to thirty thousand.

The memorial was constructed from Zhytomyr granite, which was the same material used for Lenin's Mausoleum. Due to the granite's reddish color, the stones lying at the menorah's foot seem to bleed.

As of 2006 the names of 4,300 of the 16,000 victims were etched on an underground memorial wall, illuminated by candlelight, in a room called "Room of Tragedy".

On 26 March 2022, the site's large menorah monument was damaged by Russian artillery shelling during the invasion of Ukraine.

== Museum ==
On 27 January 2002, a new exposition in the Kharkiv Holocaust Museum was officially opened. The exposition was created in December 2001, when Kharkiv commemorated the 60th anniversary of the Drobytsky Yar massacre. Excursions to the ravine had already been held before, but the official opening was on 27 January, the anniversary of the Auschwitz-Birkenau concentration camp's 1945 liberation (later designated International Holocaust Remembrance Day). Six candles were lit in memory of the six million Jews murdered in the Holocaust.

== Gallery ==
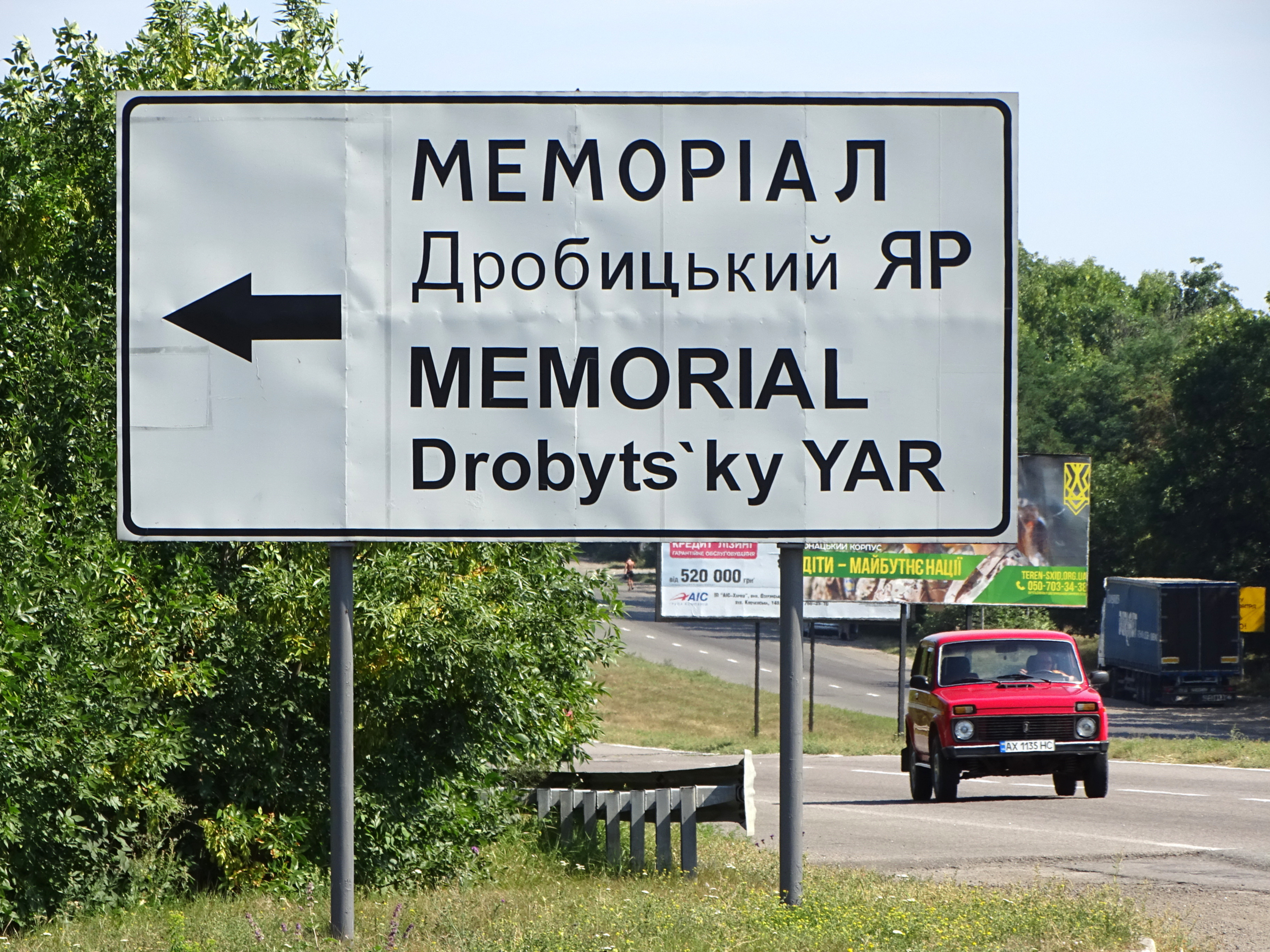
Memorial sign

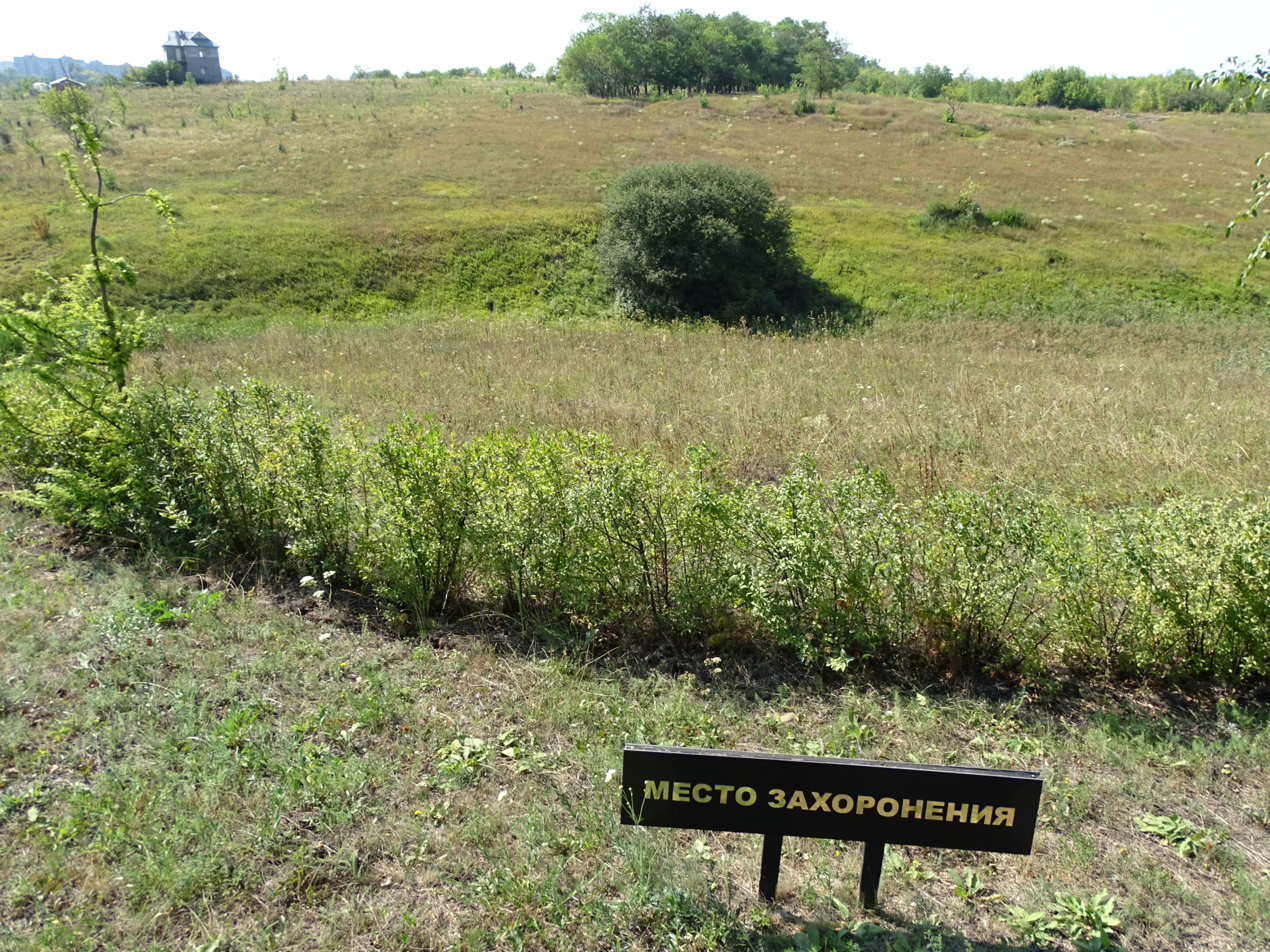
Killing fields (the sign reads 'Burial place')

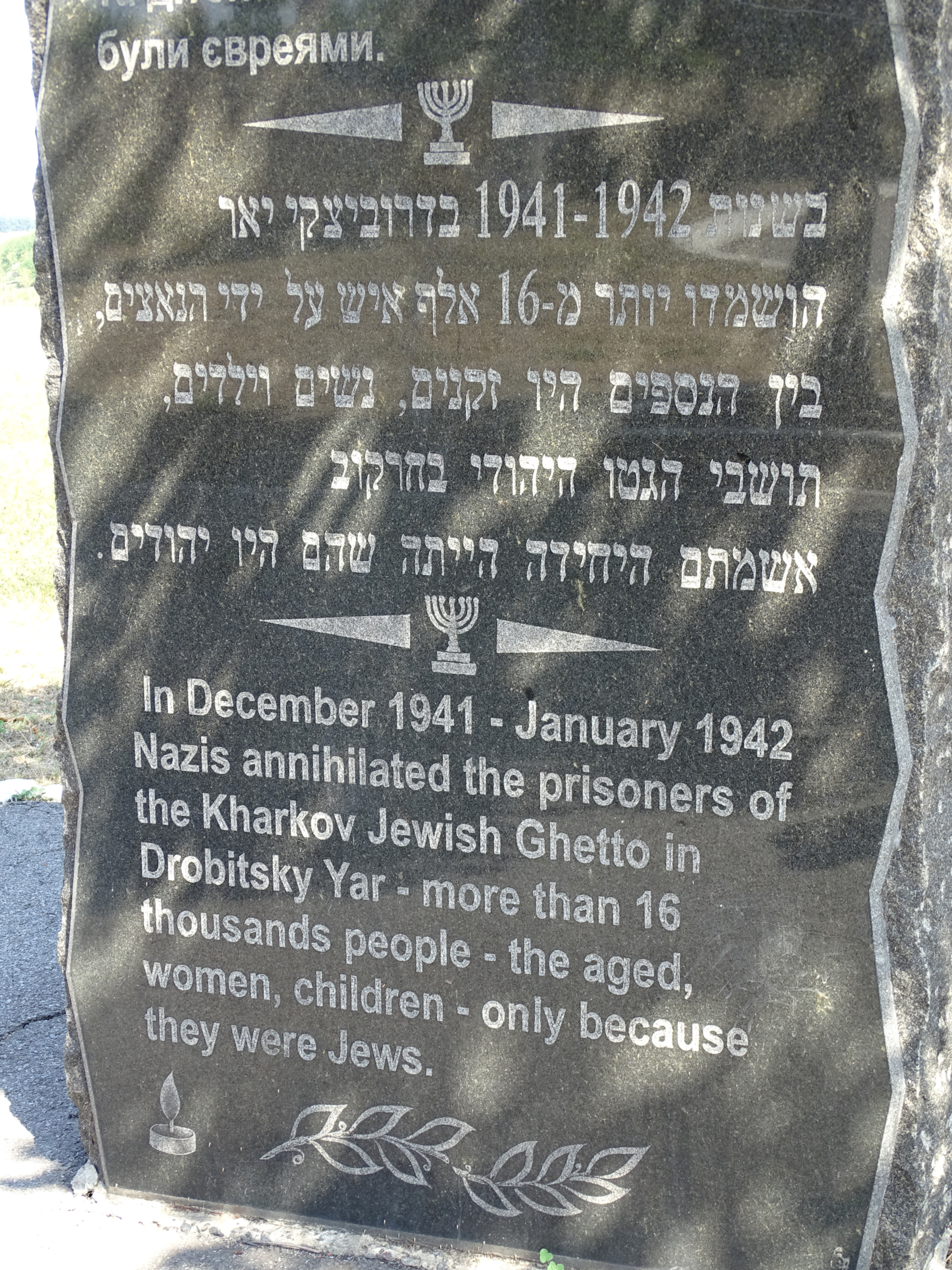
Memorial stone

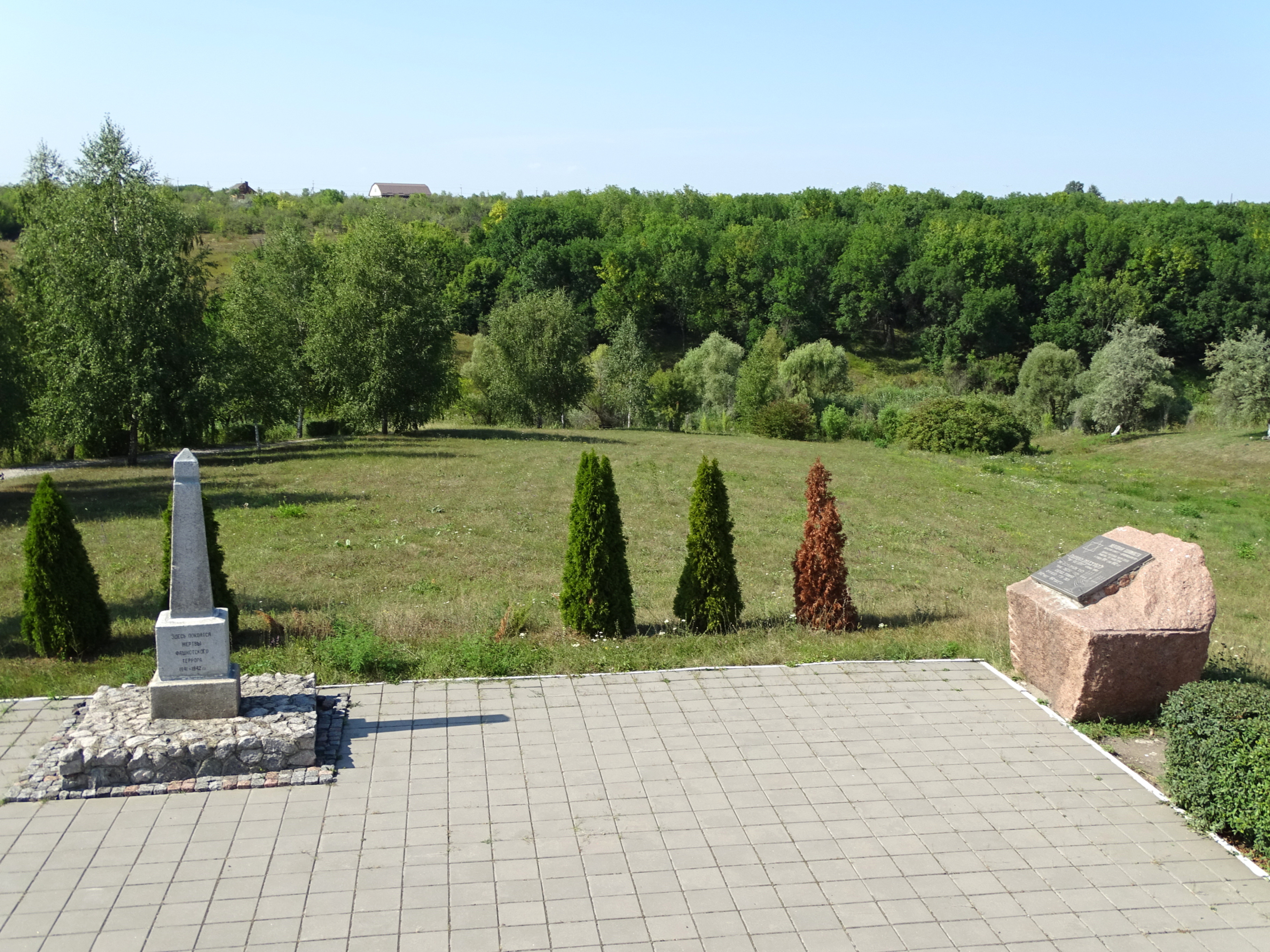
Original Soviet monument (on the left) on the killing site

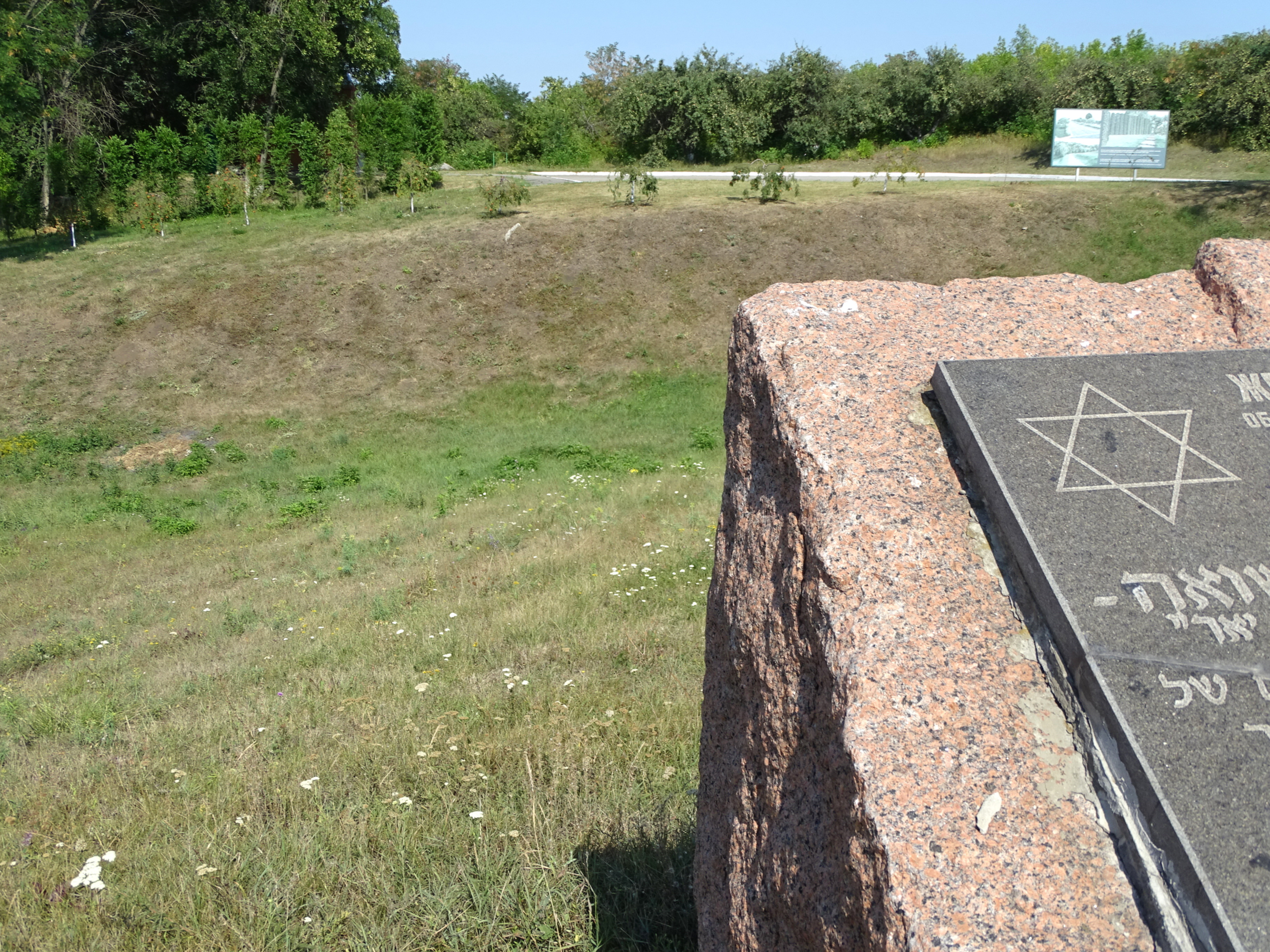
Killing site with memorial stone

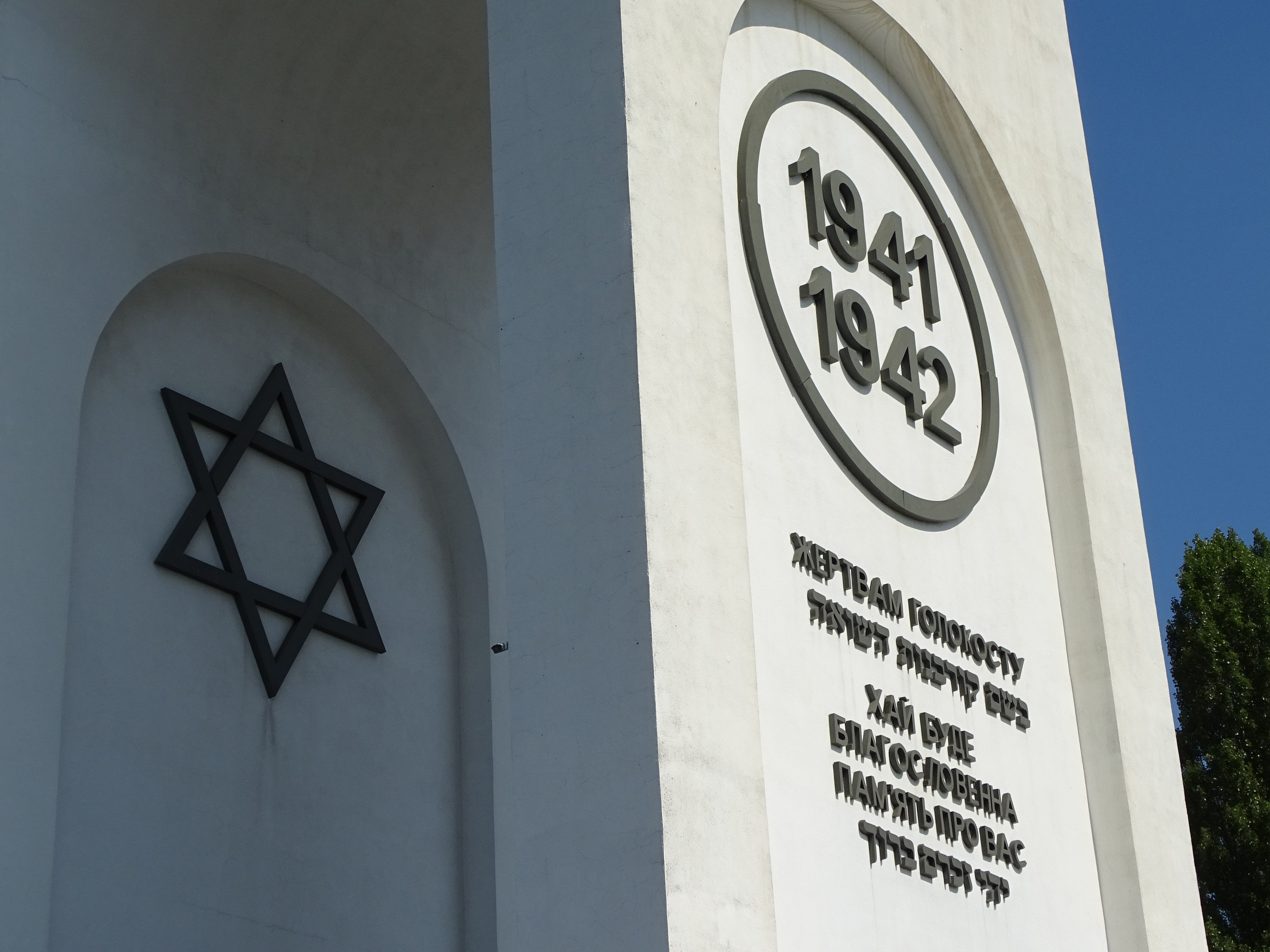
Facade of main memorial

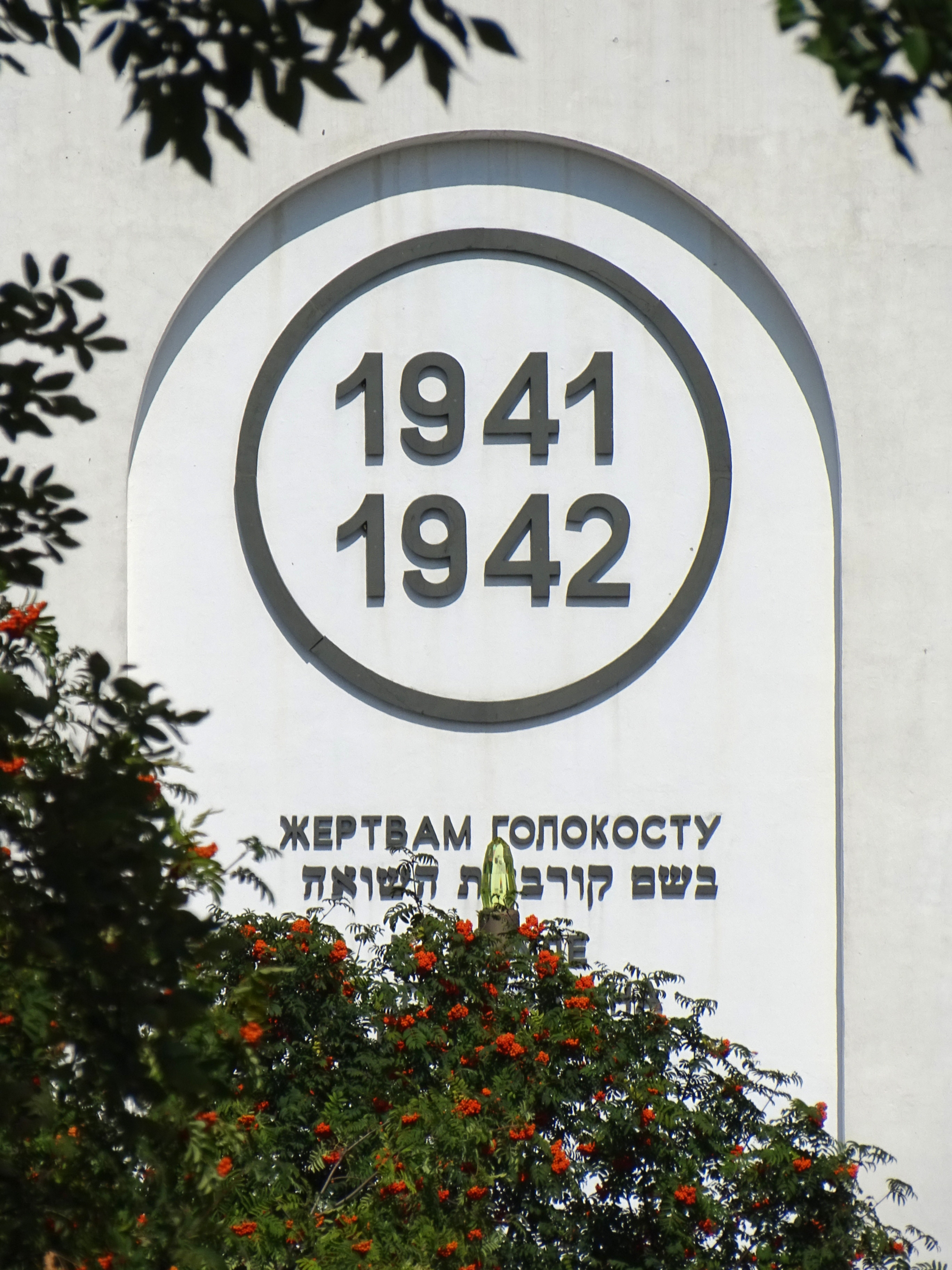
Facade of main memorial

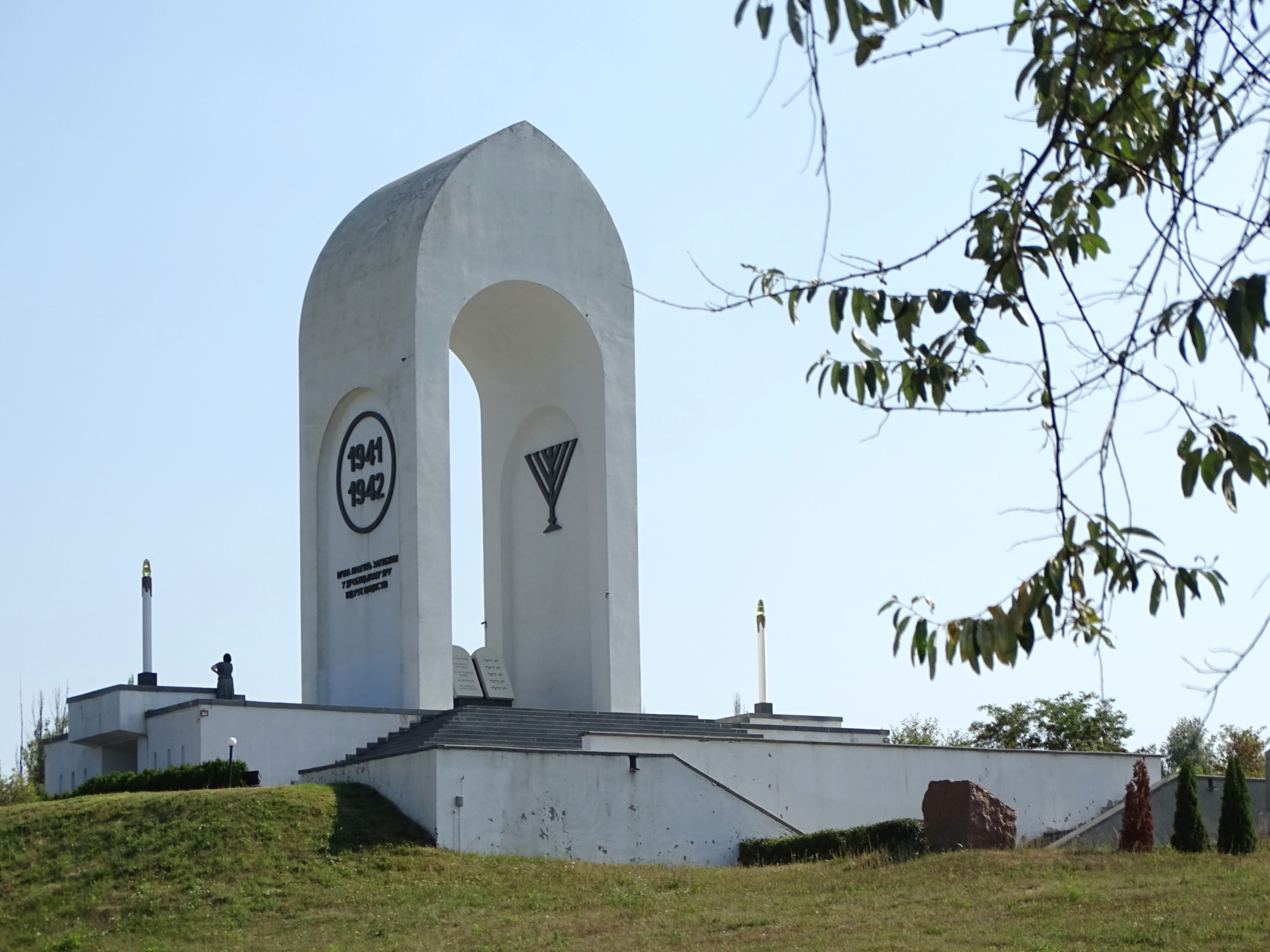
Distant view of main memorial

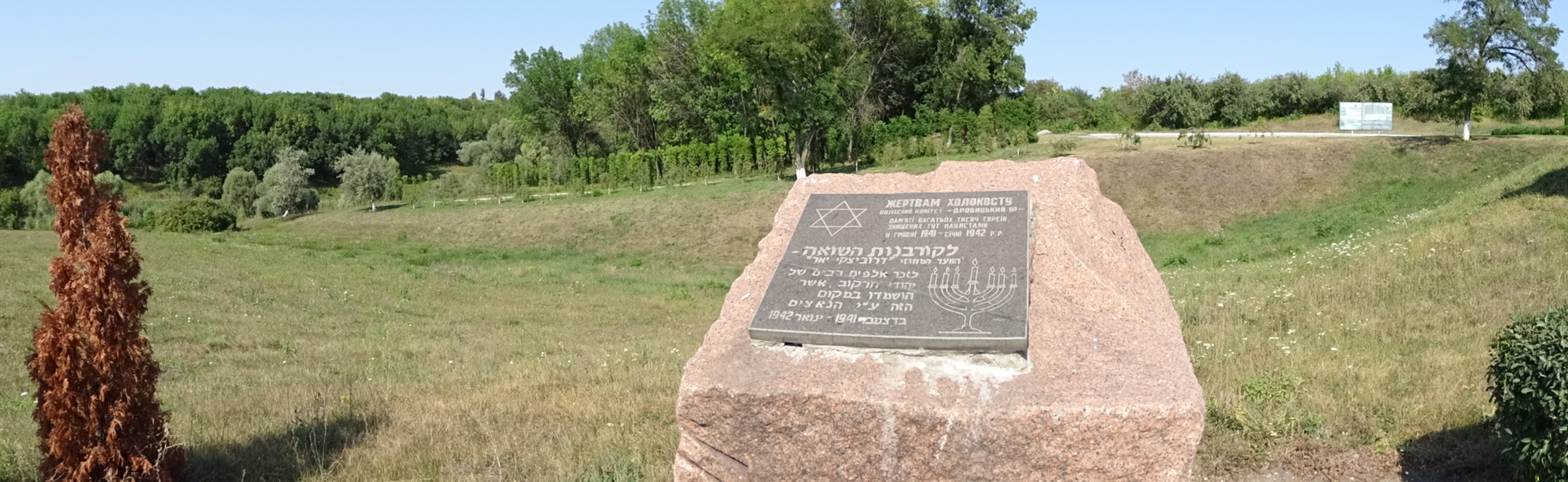
Panorama of killing site with memorial stone

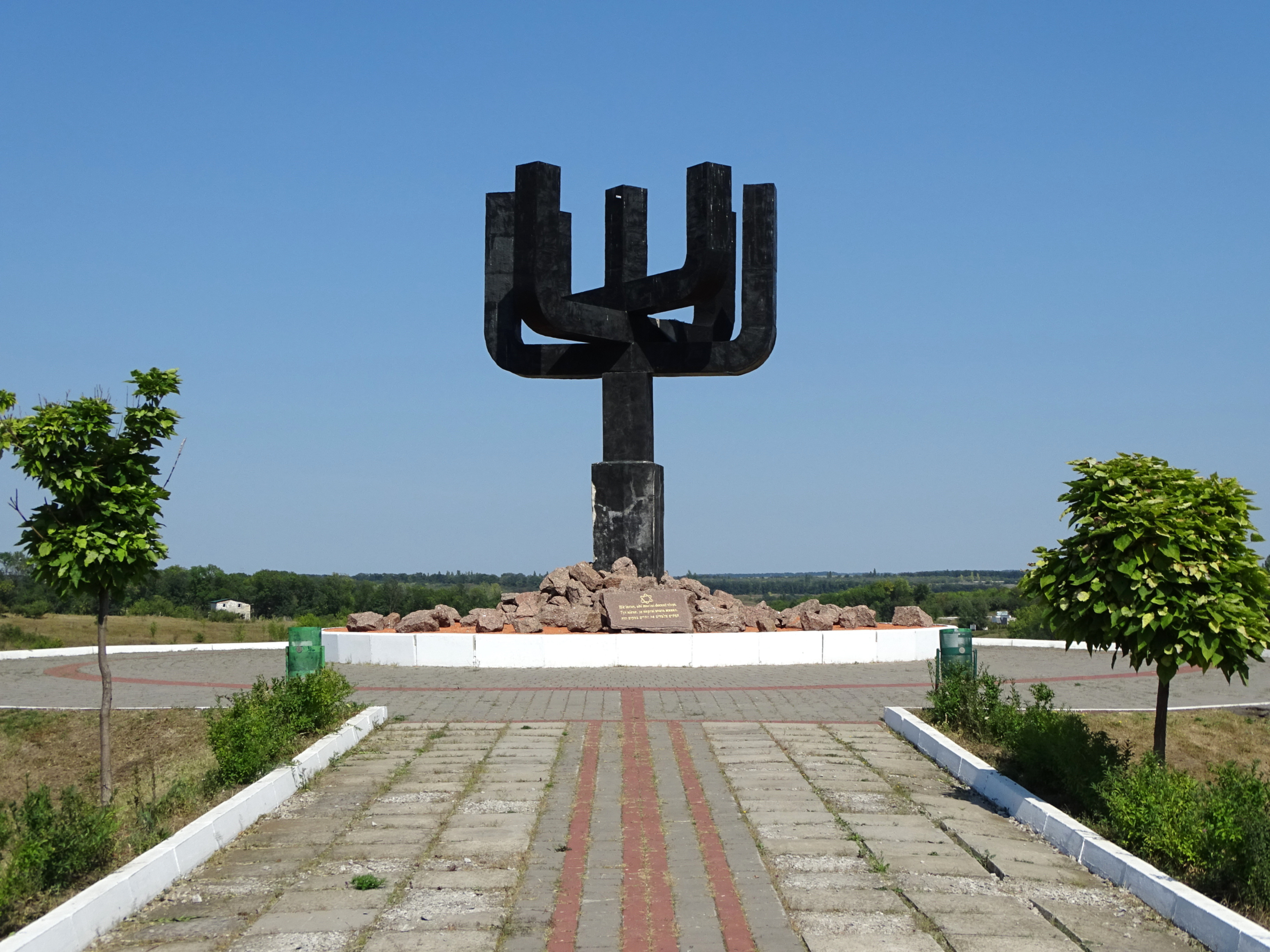
Menorah monument

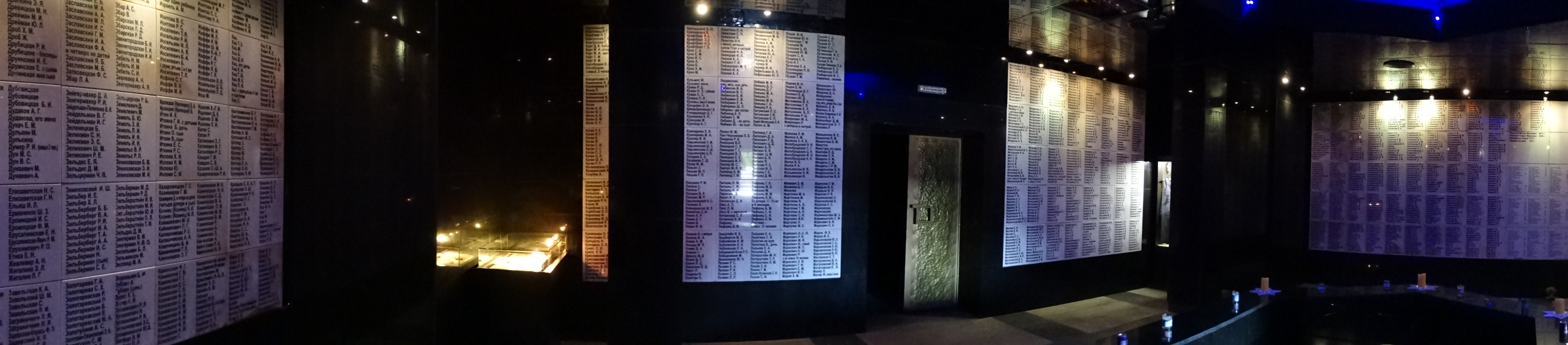
The "room of tragedy" with names of victims

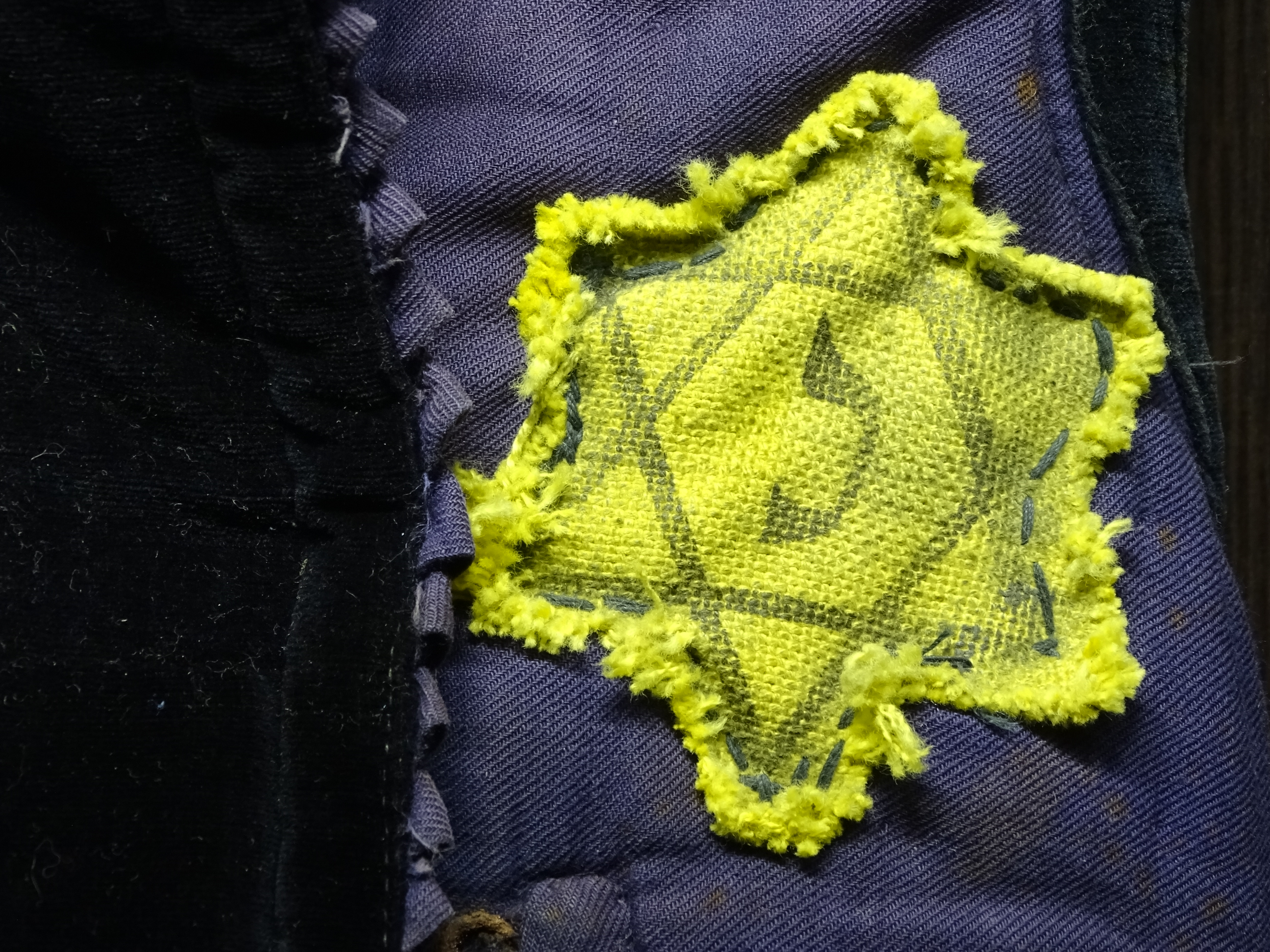
Detail of Jewish star on padded jacket

== See also ==
- Antisemitism in Ukraine
- Babi Yar – Ravine and massacre site in Kyiv, Ukraine
- Consequences of Nazism
- Genocides in history
- History of the Jews in Ukraine
- List of massacres in Ukraine
- Mass graves in the Soviet Union – Graves of executed Soviet citizens and foreigners
- Nazi crimes against Soviet POWs
- Operation Barbarossa – 1941 Axis invasion of the Soviet Union during WWII
- Reichskommissariat Ukraine – Territory of Nazi Germany from 1941 to 1944
- The Holocaust in Ukraine
- The Kindly Ones – Book by Jonathan Littell
- Ukrainian collaborationism with the Axis powers
- Ukrainian cultural heritage during the 2022 Russian invasion
- Valley of Death (Bydgoszcz) – Mass murder of Polish civilians, 1939
