= Teresin massacre =

1943 massacre in Teresin, Wołyń Voivodeship, Poland

Massacre in Teresin
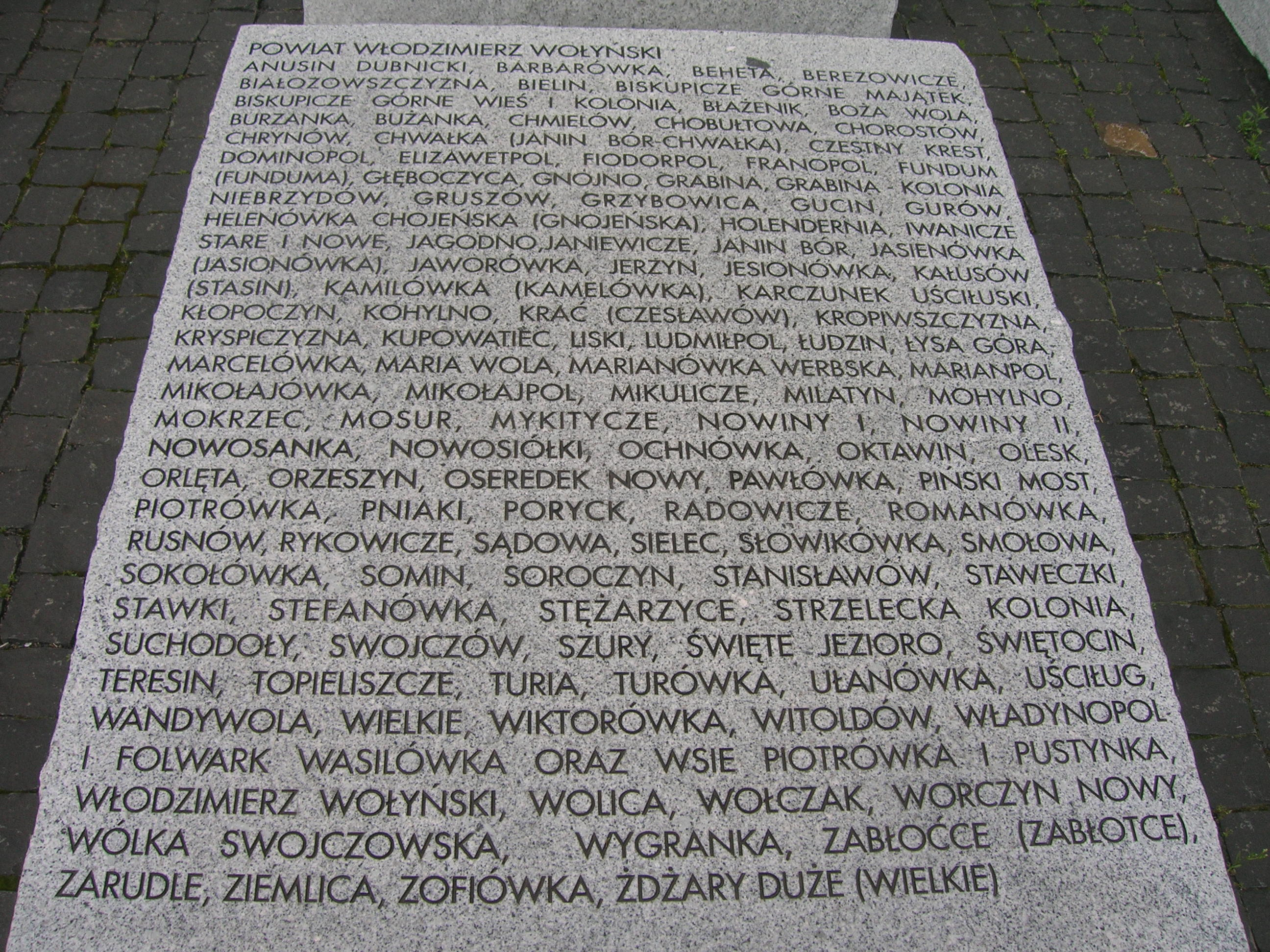
- Plaque at the Monument to the Volhynian Massacre in Warsaw mentioning Teresin
- Location: 50°51′29.8″N 24°27′57.76″E; Teresin, Volhynian Voivodeship, occupated Poland (Reichskommissariat Ukraine)
- Date: 29 August 1943
- Attack type: Massacre
- Weapons: Axes, bayonets, and other tools
- Deaths: 207
- Perpetrators: Ukrainian Insurgent Army; Ukrainian peasants
- Motive: Anti-Polish sentiment, Ukrainian nationalism, Greater Ukraine, Genocidal intent

On 29 August 1943, the Ukrainian Insurgent Army (UPA) and some Ukrainian peasants killed 207 Polish inhabitants of the colony of Teresin, located in Włodzimierz County, Wołyń Voivodeship, as part of a larger campaign against the Poles in the region, considered as a genocide.

Teresin, inhabited by about 300 Poles and a few Ukrainian families, was attacked by UPA members and Ukrainian peasants from Kohylno and Gnojno, Włodzimierz County. The attackers broke into houses and murdered the Polish residents using axes, bayonets, and other tools. They also looted the victims' property.

== Bibliography ==
- Motyka, Grzegorz (2006). Ukraińska partyzantka 1942-1960: działalność Organizacji Ukraińskich Nacjonalistów i Ukraińskiej Powstańczej Armii. Warsaw: Instytut Studiów Politycznych PAN : RYTM. ISBN 83-88490-58-3.
- Ludobójstwo na Wołyniu. 2000.
