= Nikolaev massacre =

1941 mass murder of Russian Jews

Nikolev Massacre
- Location: Mykolaiv (also known as Nikolaev), Ukraine; Kherson, then in the Soviet Union
- Date: September 16-30, 1941
- Perpetrators: Einsatzgruppe D under command of Otto Ohlendorf
- Victims: 35,782 Soviet civilians, mostly Jews
- Documentation: Einsatzgruppen document "Jews and Communists", October 2, 1941. evidence at Nuremberg trials NO-3137
- Notes: Einsatzgruppen Trial

The Nikolaev Massacre was a massacre which resulted in the deaths of 35,782 Soviet citizens, most of whom were Jews, during World War II, on September 16–30, 1941. It took place in and around the Ukrainian city of Mykolaiv (also known by its Russian name, Nikolaev) and the neighboring city of Kherson in (current) southern Ukraine (then Soviet Union). The massacre was carried out by German troops of Sonderkommando 11a and Einsatzkommando 12, which were subunits of Einsatzgruppe D under the command of Otto Ohlendorf. The killings were committed by many of the same troops who carried out the massacre at Babi Yar, and the victims were counted and described in an Einsatzgruppen document dated October 2, 1941 as "Jews and Communists". This document was entered into evidence at the Nuremberg Trials as NO-3137.

Nine of the perpetrators were tried by a Soviet military court in January 1946. Seven of them were sentenced to death and publicly hanged on 17 January 1946. The other two each received 20-year sentences. Ohlendorf was prosecuted by an American military court in the Einsatzgruppen trial and sentenced to death. He was executed in 1951.

== See also ==
- The Holocaust in Ukraine
