= 2025 Ovruch train attack =

Grenade attack in Ovruch, Ukraine

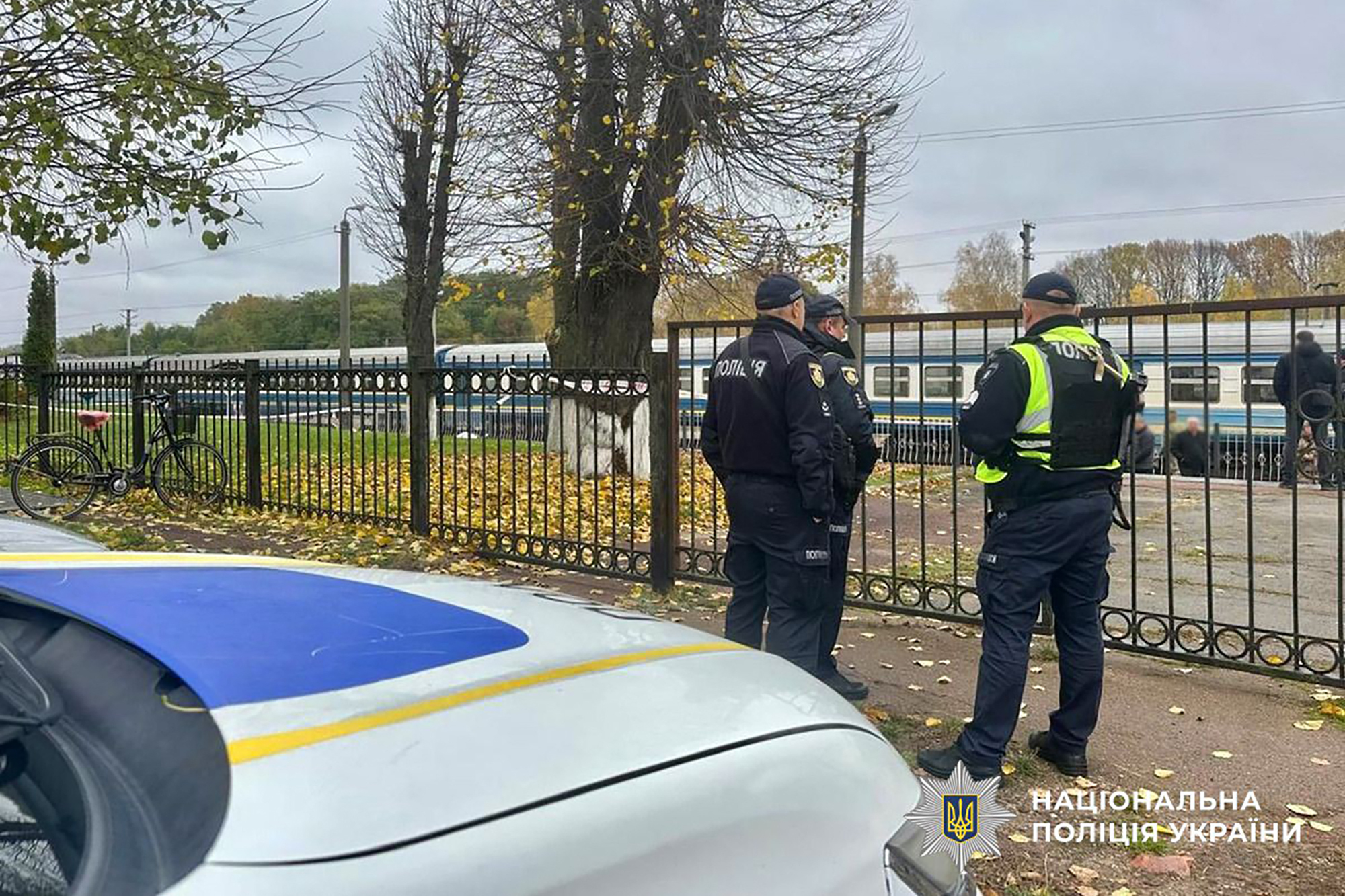
- Ukrainian police officers working at the train station after the attack
- Location: Ovruch, Zhytomyr Oblast, Ukraine
- Date: 24 October 2025 c. 10:30 a.m.
- Attack type: Explosion, mass murder
- Weapon: Grenade
- Deaths: 5 (including the perpetrator)
- Injuries: 12
- Perpetrator: Undisclosed
- Motive: Evading arrest warrant

On the morning of 24 October 2025, a fugitive from Kharkiv detonated a grenade on a train in Ovruch, Zhytomyr Oblast, Ukraine, killing three civilian women and a border guard, and wounding 12 other people. The perpetrator also died in the explosion. The attack happened when State Border Guard Service officers were checking passengers’ documents on a diesel train platform. The perpetrator was identified as a 23-year-old man from Kharkiv who had recently been detained for attempting to violate the state border in the western section of the state border.
