= Chernihiv Maniac =

Ukrainian spree killer and neo-Nazi

Oleksandr Sergov
- Born: Oleksandr Yuryevich Sergov; 1988 (age 37–38); Chernihiv, UkSSR

Details
- Date: April 20–21, 2010
- Locations: Liskovitsa, Chernihiv, Ukraine
- Killed: 3
- Injured: 1
- Weapon: Shovel

Oleksandr Yuryevich Sergov (born 1988), known as the Chernihiv Maniac, is a Ukrainian spree killer and neo-Nazi who killed three people and maimed another on the night of April 20 to 21, 2010, Adolf Hitler's birthday. He was found not guilty by reason of insanity and confined to a mental institution for his crimes.

== Murders ==
On the night of April 20 to 21, 2010, Sergov killed three people with a shovel in Chernihiv's Leskovitsa neighborhood. The following morning, he severed a victim's ear, but failed to kill him.

The victims were identified as:

- Maria Andronnik (84) — her headless corpse was found at about 6 pm near a house, found by a driver who was parking his car.
- Olena Kasatkina (60) — about four hours after the first murder, her headless corpse was found near the store, where she had gone to buy mineral water.
- Ivan Gapshenko (72) — his decapitated corpse was found at his dacha by his grandson.
- Valeriy Yakimenko (45) — the only surviving victim. The man dodged his assailant's shovel attack and then frightened him off by screaming. He later aided the authorities in creating an identikit of the offender.

It was believed that Sergov knew one of the victims, who had sewn him various Nazi-related items.

== Arrest, trial and sentence ==
On April 21, Sergov was detained. The shovel along with bloodied clothing were confiscated from him. The arrest was made possible thanks to the facial composite compiled by the surviving victim, as well as information from hospital staff.

22-year-old Sergov, a local neo-Nazi who committed the crimes on Adolf Hitler's birthday. The detainee had schizophrenia, and had previously been arrested for drug offences.

After his arrest, Sergov was placed in a temporary detention center. A forensic psychiatric examination was carried out in two stages: an outpatient in Chernihiv, and an inpatient in Kyiv. On June 9, he was transported from the Chernihiv SIZO to Kyiv, where he was placed in a psychiatric hospital. . The final results were announced on July 27: the suspect was mentally ill when he committed the crimes, and didn't realize the gravity of his actions.

On September 23, 2010, the Nozozavodsky District Court in Chernihiv announced that, due to his illness, Sergov was declared unfit for trial, and would instead be sent for psychiatric treatment in a clinic with increased supervision. Some relatives of the victims expressed their intention to appeal the decision, since, due to the absence of the designated guilty person in it, their claims for compensation and material damages were not satisfied. Sergov was hospitalized in Dnipro, in a facility designed for patients who have committed or are potentially capable of committing socially dangerous acts. There are differing opinions about what happened to him after.

== Public outcry ==
According to the weekly news program Vesti.net, the Chernihiv Maniac case became one of the main stories to be covered in national television for its time, taking only second place to the air travel disruptions across Europe.

Sergov's capture is considered a classic example of uniting the mass media, the public and the police to solve a crime. The head of the Criminal Investigation Department of the Ministry of Internal Affairs, Major-General Valeriy Lytvyn, said that this case will be included in textbooks to be studied by cadets.
