= Volhynian Massacre Memorial (Warsaw) =

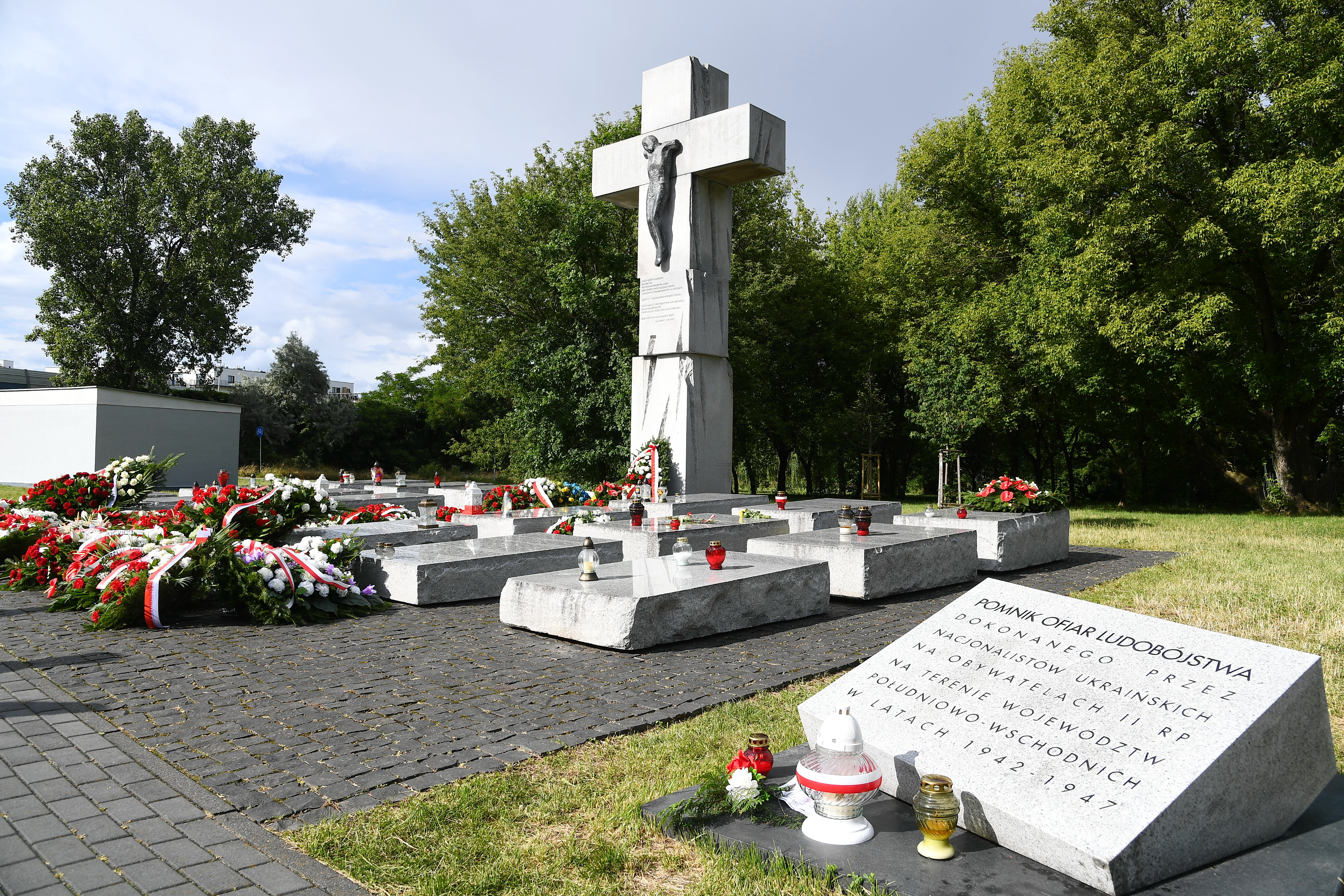
- The monument in 2022
- Location: Warsaw, Poland
- Coordinates: 52°16′33″N 20°58′23″E
- Designer: Marek Moderau
- Height: 7 metres (23 ft)
- Completion date: July 11, 2013
- Dedicated to: Volhynia genocide

Volhynian Massacre Memorial (Polish: Pomnik Rzezi Wołyńskiej) is a monument in Warsaw, Poland, located at the Volhynian Square in the district of Żoliborz.

== Description ==
The monument was unveiled on July 11, 2013, on the 70th anniversary of the Volhynia genocide. It was designed by Marek Moderau.

The dominant feature of the monument is a seven-meter cross with a figure of Jesus Christ without arms. The monument covers an area of 160 square meters. In front of the cross, there are 18 plaques with the names of towns from seven pre-war voivodeships of the Second Polish Republic: Wołyń, Polesie, Stanisławów, Tarnopol, Lwów, and partially Lublin and Kraków. One of the plaques bears the inscription: In tribute to Polish citizens, victims of a mass crime with signs of genocide committed by OUN-UPA between 1942 and 1947 in the territories of the former seven voivodeships of the Second Polish Republic. A sarcophagus at the foot of the cross will contain soil from 2,136 towns, the names of which are listed on the plaques.

== Gallery ==
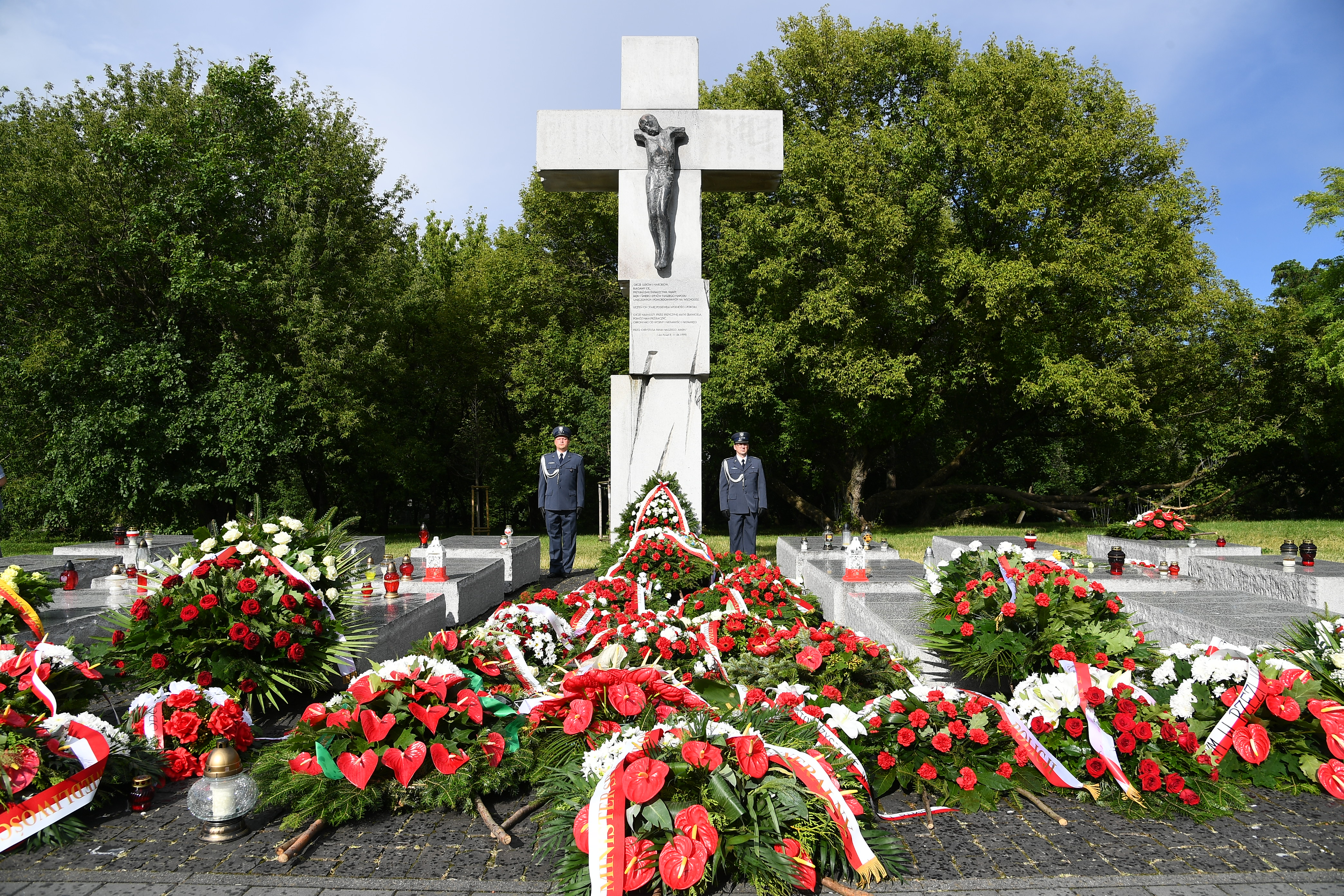

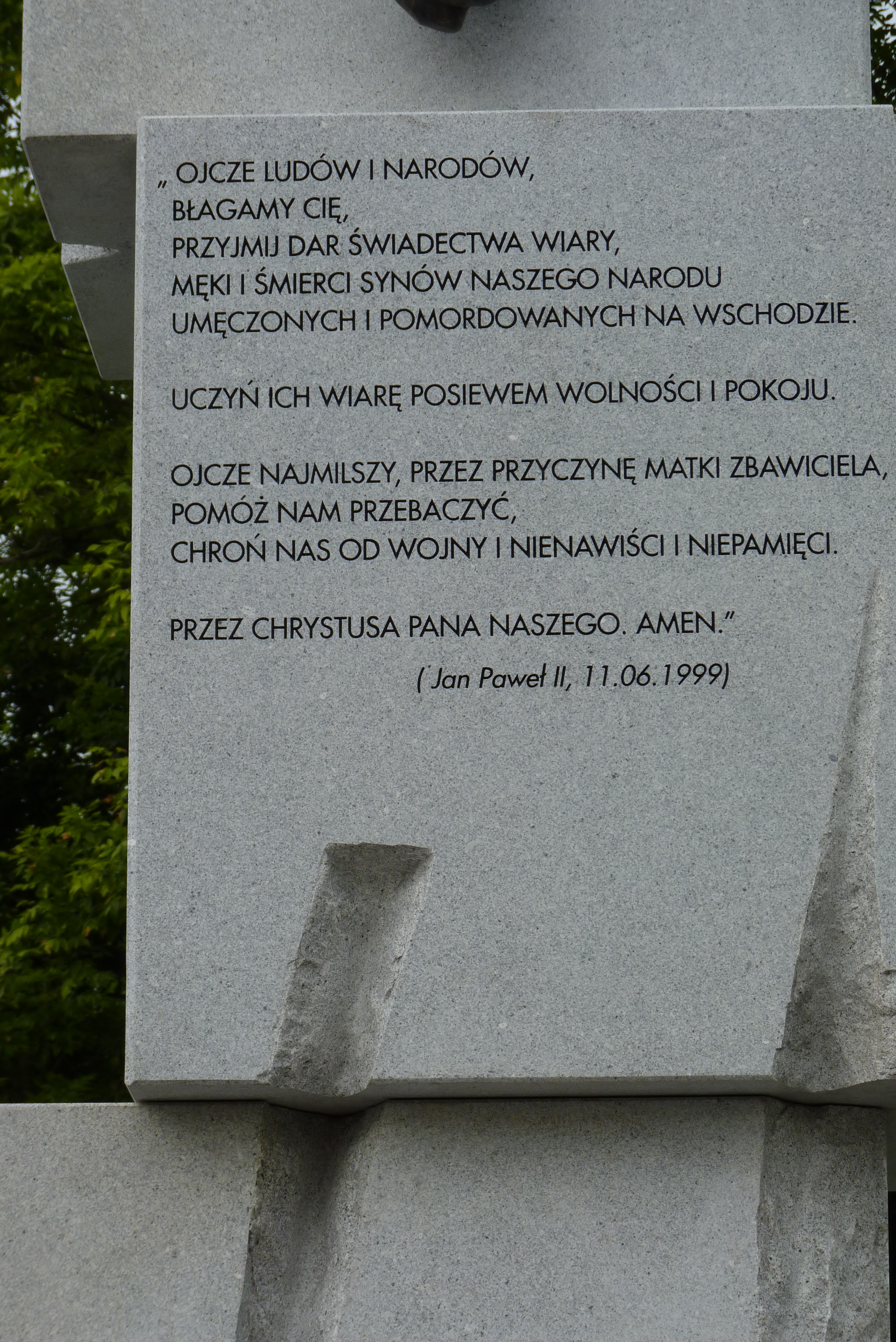

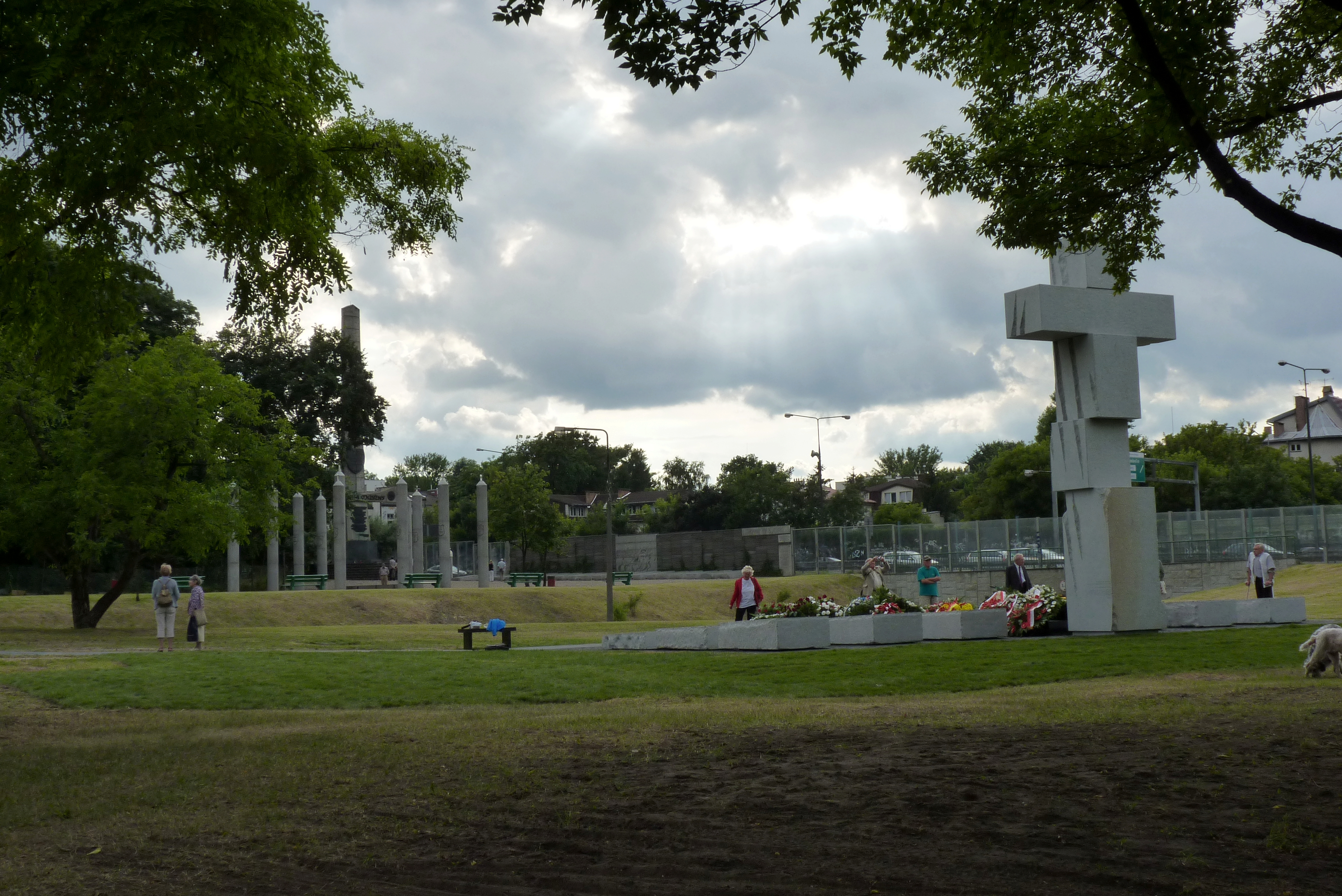

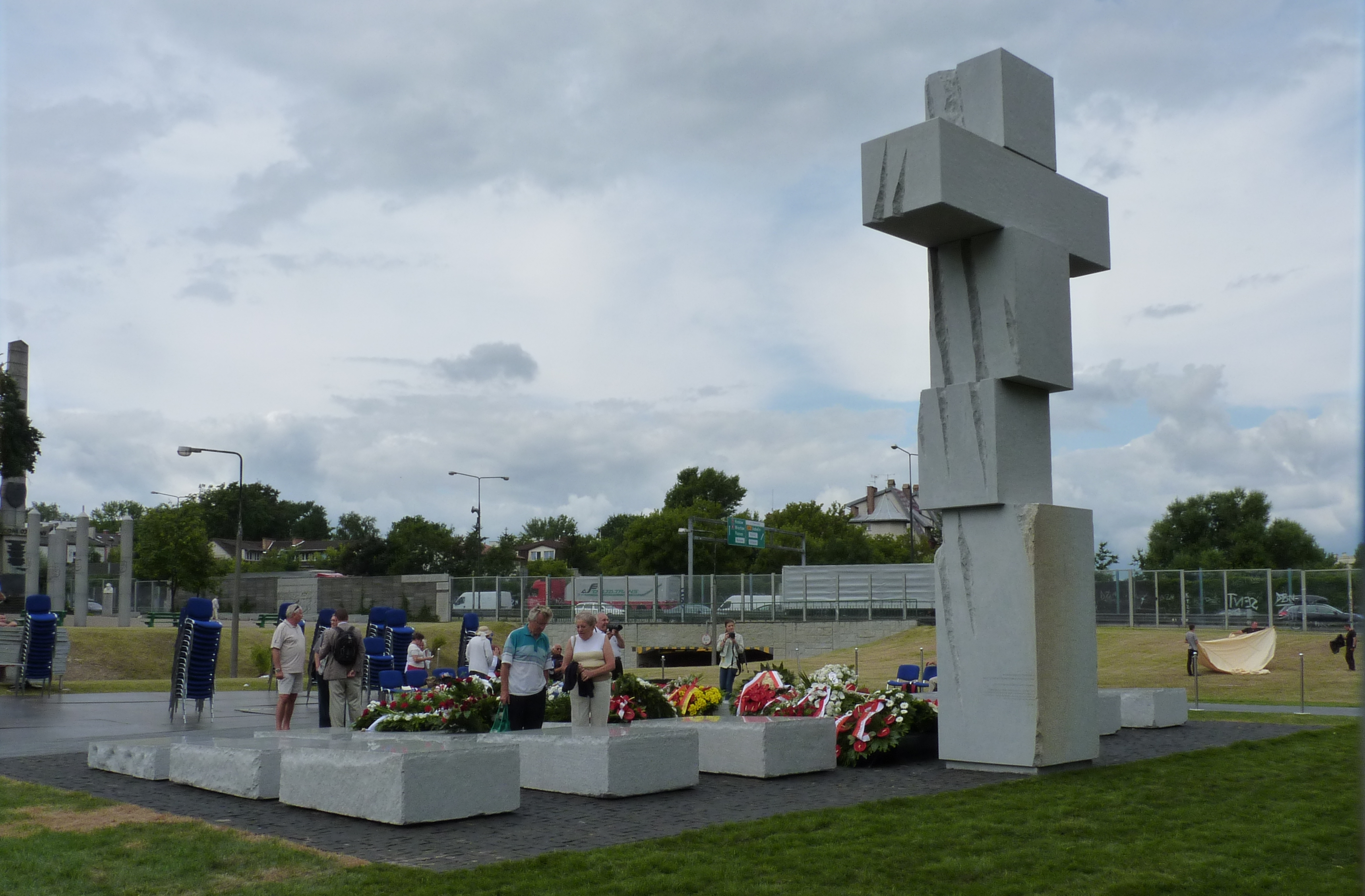
