= 2024 Kostiantynivka supermarket strike =

Incident during the Russian invasion of Ukraine

2024 Kostiantynivka supermarket missile attack
- Part of Attacks on civilians in the Russian invasion of Ukraine
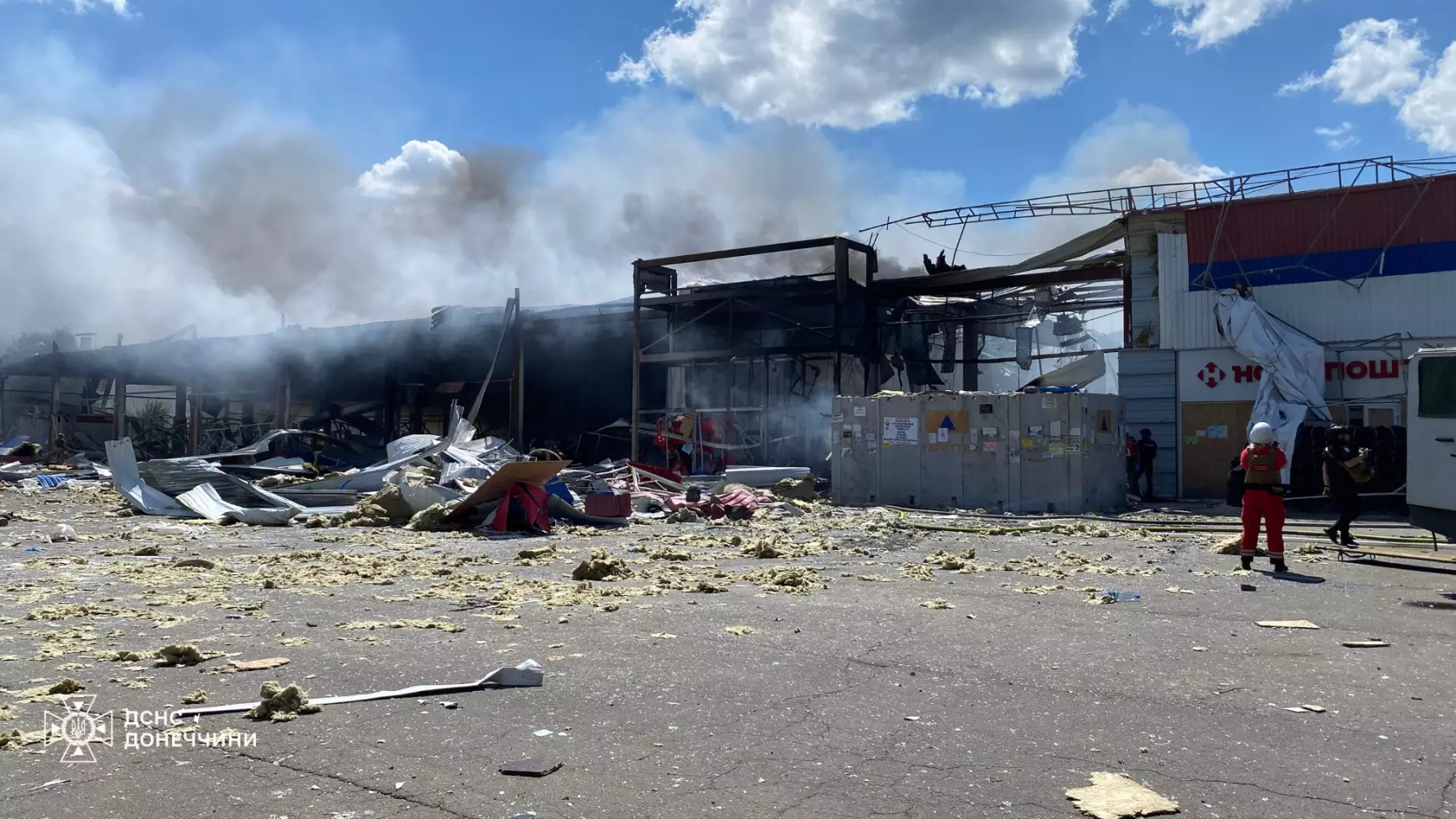
- Impact site of the Kh-38 missile strike on the EKO-Market hypermarket on 9 August 2024: Epicenter of the Kh-38 missile strike
- Location: 48°30′32″N 37°40′29″E; Kostiantynivka, Ukraine
- Date: 9 August 2024; ~11:04 (UTC+3)
- Attack type: Missile strike
- Weapon: Kh-38 missile
- Deaths: 14 (including three children)
- Injuries: 44
- Perpetrator: Russian Armed Forces

On 9 August 2024, the Russian Armed Forces conducted a missile attack on the EKO-market supermarket in Kostiantynivka, Donetsk Oblast, killing 14 people and injuring 44 others. Damaged were 10 private houses, 9 stores, a supermarket, a post office, retail pavilions, a gas pipeline, a car wash, and 12 vehicles. At the impact site, rescuers dismantled 76 tons of building debris.

== Background ==
The EKO-market supermarket opened on 30 December 2008, at the intersection of Gromova and Levanievskogo Streets. It had a daily attendance of about 4,000 people. Later, the supermarket began gradually leasing part of its space, leading to the appearance of new establishments such as a Nova Poshta branch, an entertainment complex, cafes, a cinema, shops, and other retail outlets within its premises.

== Attack ==
Vadym Filashkin, the governor of Donetsk Oblast, at first said that the attack was conducted using artillery, but later stated that a Kh-38 missile was used. Fourteen people, including three children, were killed, while 44 others were injured.

According to Ukrainian interior minister Ihor Klymenko, the attack also hit houses and shops. Filashkin later said that four houses, nine shops, a car wash and 12 cars had been damaged. A freight department of the postal service firm Nova Poshta located inside the supermarket was also damaged, injuring one of its employees.

The attack was followed later in the day by a round of shelling from Smerch multiple launch rocket systems that injured two people and damaged six houses and a gas pipeline.

== Reactions ==
The head of the Presidential Administration of Ukraine Andriy Yermak called the attack "another case of Russian terror", while President Volodymyr Zelenskyy pledged to hold Russia responsible.

== See also ==
- September 2023 Kostiantynivka missile strike
- 25 May 2024 Kharkiv missile strikes
- Intensive shelling of Ukraine on 13 December 2024
