= Kostiantynivka missile strike =

Kostiantynivka missile strike may refer to:

- September 2023 Kostiantynivka missile strike
- 2024 Kostiantynivka supermarket missile attack
