= Intensive shelling of Ukraine on 13 December 2024 =

During the night and early morning of 13 December 2024, Russian forces launched a massive attack using cruise and ballistic missiles, as well as ‘Shahed’-type drones.

A total of 94 missiles were fired, of which 81 were successfully intercepted. A total of 193 attack UAVs were also deployed. This attack was the largest since the start of the Russian invasion.

== Consequences ==
=== Lviv Region ===
Energy infrastructure facilities in Stryi, Lviv Oblast, have been attacked; there were no casualties or injuries.

=== Ivano-Frankivsk Region ===
Debris has been reported to have fallen in the region; an enemy missile is believed to have struck Burshtyn, with no casualties.

=== Ternopil Region ===
There have been reports of a suspected shelling of infrastructure near the village of Velyka Berezovytsia; no casualties have been reported.

=== Kyiv Region ===
Private homes and power lines were damaged by falling debris from the downed UAVs; there were no casualties.

=== Kirovohrad Region ===
A private property has been damaged in Novoarkhangelsk; there were no casualties.

=== Chernihiv Region ===
In the Pryluky district, a fire broke out in a non-residential building following an attack by a strike drone. In the Nizhyn district, a farm building was damaged, and 11 cows were killed.

=== Odesa Region ===
Debris from the rocket damaged civilian infrastructure; there were no casualties.

=== Kharkiv Region ===
According to Oleg Synehubov, head of the Kharkiv Regional State Administration, a ballistic missile strike was carried out on the Kharkiv district. In Kharkiv, a Shahed-136 drone struck the roof of a five-storey block of flats. A civilian business in the village of Mirne was hit; four people are reported to have been injured.

== Reactions ==
- The Ukrainian Foreign Minister, Andriy Sibiga, has called on international partners to provide 20 air defence systems to protect energy infrastructure from Russian terror.

== Shooting down ==
For the first time in the history of the F-16 Fighting Falcon, a fighter jet destroyed six enemy cruise missiles in a single combat sortie, two of them with its aircraft cannon. The Ukrainian pilot had only four air-to-air missiles under the wings of his F-16: medium- and short-range variants. The longer-range missiles were fired first; the pilot then had to close the distance to around two miles to deploy the short-range missiles..

== See also ==
- Russo-Ukrainian war
- September 2023 Kostiantynivka missile strike
- List of wars involving Russia
- List of wars involving Ukraine
