= Kostiantynivka Raion =

Former subdivision of Donetsk Oblast, Ukraine

Kostiantynivka Raion Костянтинівський район
- Raion
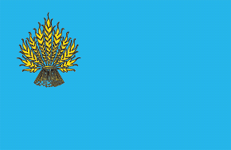
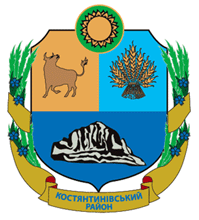
- Flag Coat of arms

- Coordinates: 48°31′36″N 37°42′15″E
- Country: Ukraine
- Region: Donetsk Oblast
- Established: 7 March 1923
- Disestablished: 18 July 2020
- Admin. center: Kostiantynivka
- Subdivisions: List: 0 — city councils; 0 — settlement councils; 20 — rural councils; Number of localities: 0 — cities; 0 — urban-type settlements; 49 — villages; 11 — rural settlements

Government
  - Governor: Serhiy Ivakhnin

Area
  - Total: 1,172 km^{2} (453 sq mi)
- Elevation: 86 m (282 ft)

Population (2020)
  - Total: 17,166
  - Density: 14.65/km^{2} (37.93/sq mi)
- Time zone: UTC+02:00 (EET)
  - Summer (DST): UTC+03:00 (EEST)
- Postal index: 85100-85185
- Area code: +380-6272
- Website: www.donoda.gov.ua

Kostiantynivka Raion (Ukrainian: Костянтинівський район; Russian: Константиновский район) was one of the administrative raions (a district) of Donetsk Oblast in eastern Ukraine. It covered approximately 4.4 percent of the oblast's total area.

The raion was created on 7 March 1923 as part of the Ukrainian Soviet Socialist Republic. Its administrative center was the city of Kostiantynivka, although the city itself was not administratively part of the Kostiantynivka Raion and was incorporated as a city of oblast significance. The raion was abolished on 18 July 2020 as part of the administrative reform of Ukraine, which reduced the number of raions of Donetsk Oblast to eight, of which only five were controlled by the government. The last estimate of the raion population was 17,166 (2020 est.). The 2001 Ukrainian Census gave the population of 21,132.

== Administrative divisions ==
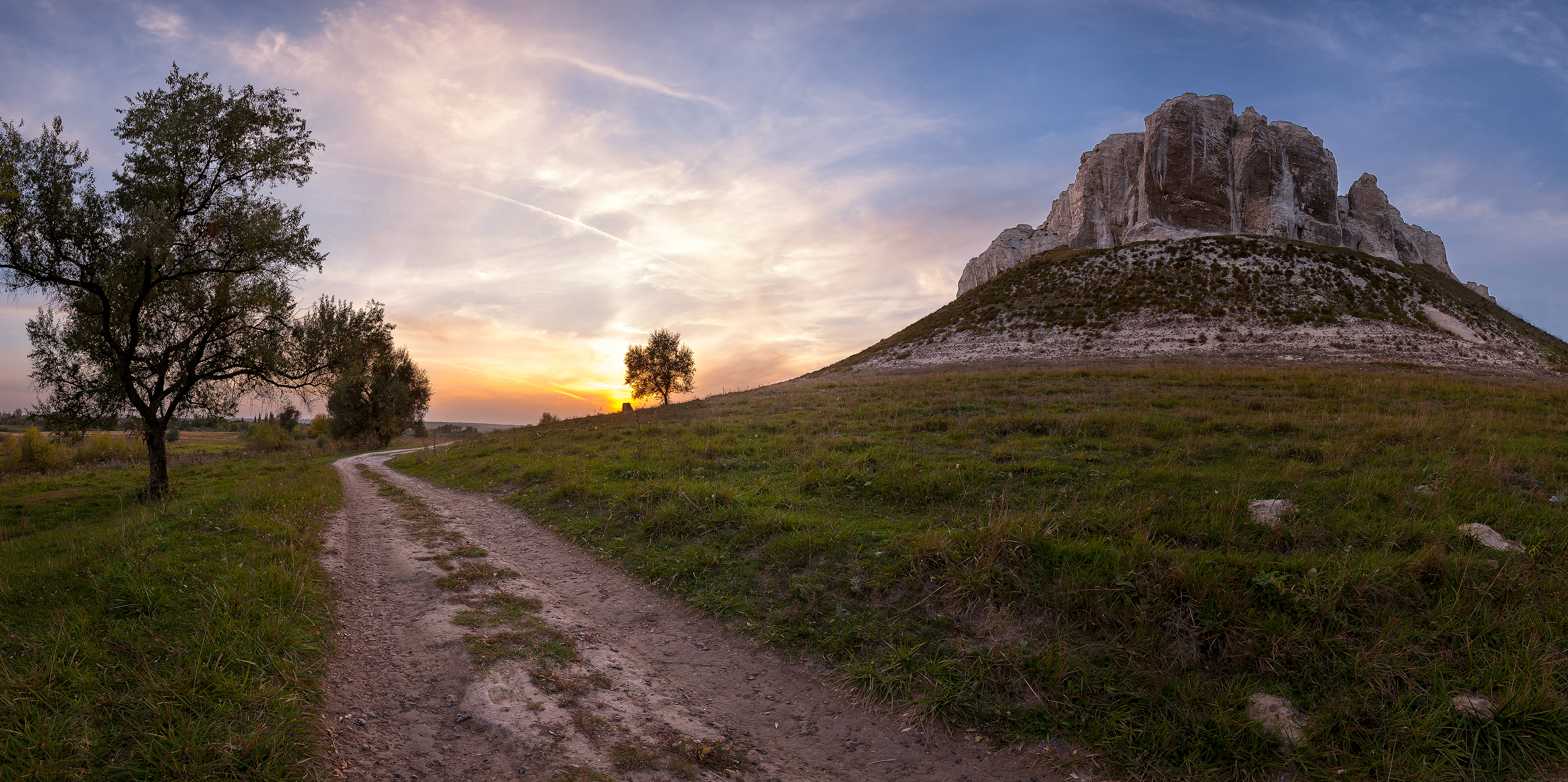
Rock formations close to the village of Bilokuzmynivka.

Kostiantynivka Raion was divided in a way that follows the general administrative scheme in Ukraine. Local government was also organized along a similar scheme nationwide. Consequently, raions were subdivided into councils, which were the prime level of administrative division in the country.

Each of the raion's urban localities administered their own councils, often containing a few other villages within its jurisdiction. However, only a handful of rural localities were organized into councils, which also might contain a few villages within its jurisdiction.

Accordingly, the Kostiantynivka Raion was divided into:

- 20 village councils

Overall, the raion had a total of 60 populated localities, consisting of 49 villages, and 11 rural settlements.

== Demographics ==
As of the 2001 Ukrainian census:

Ethnicity

- Ukrainians: 77.3%
- Russians: 19.9%
- Belarusians: 0.9%
