= Kostiantynivka =

City in Donetsk Oblast, Ukraine

Kostiantynivka Костянтинівка
- City
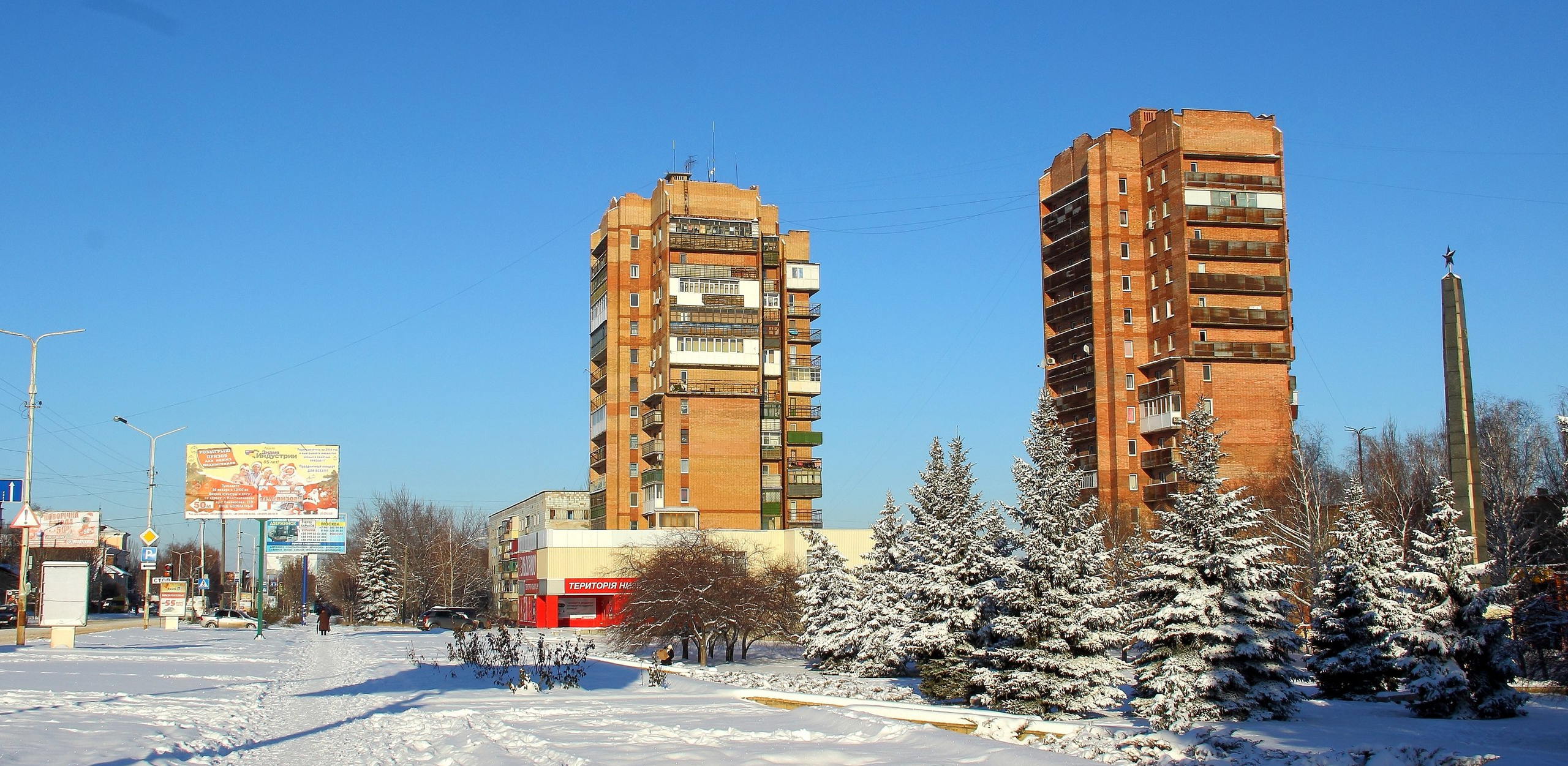
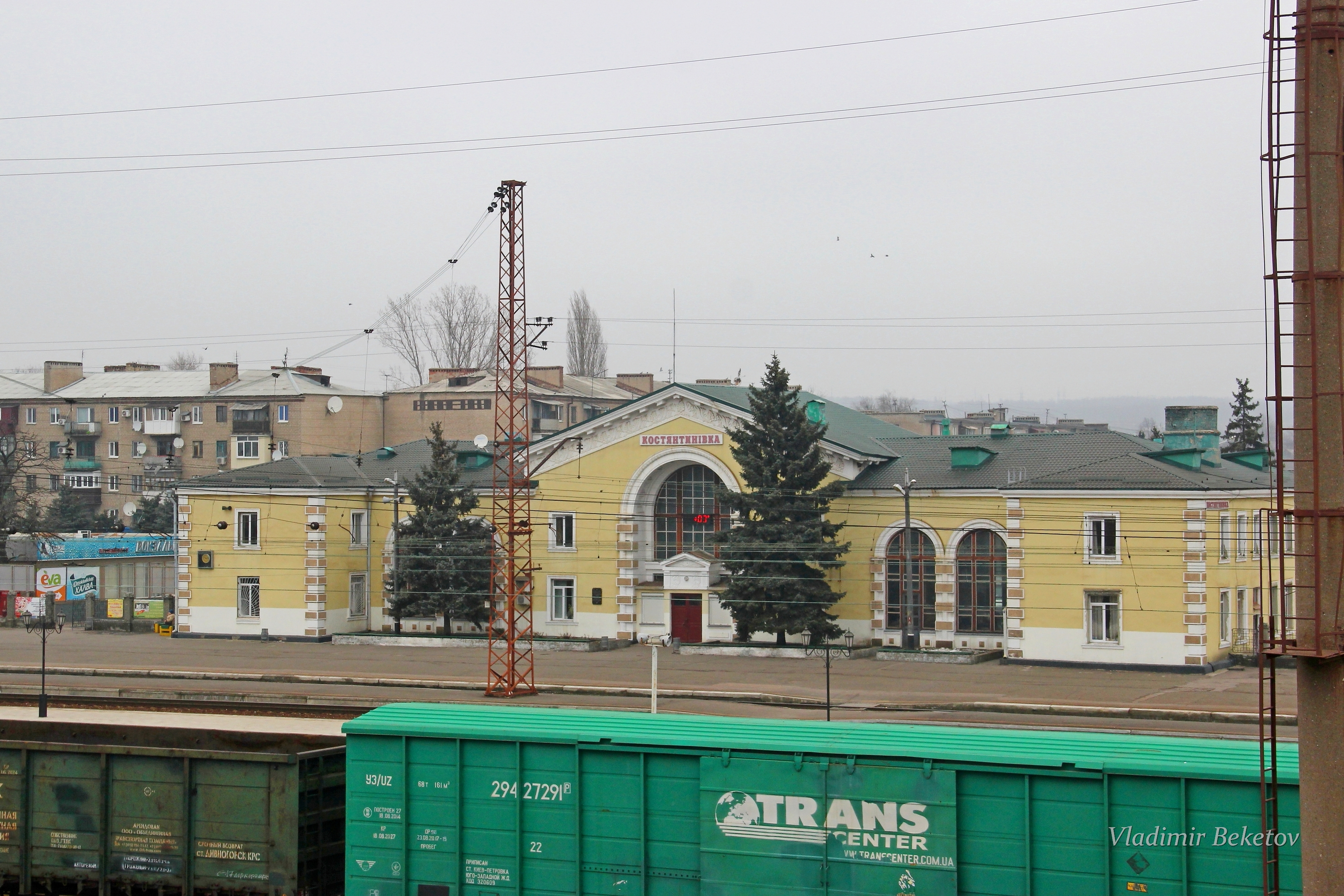
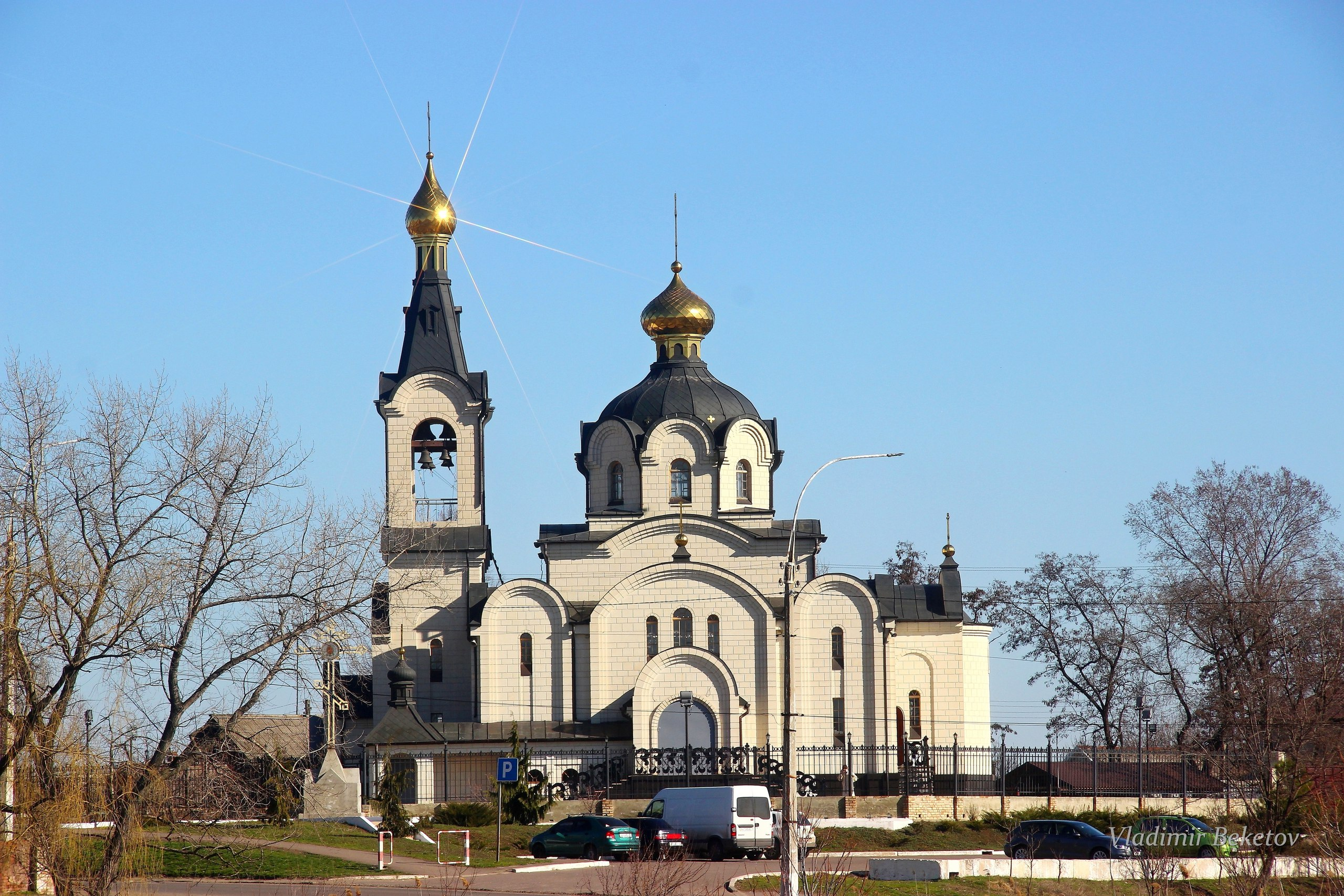
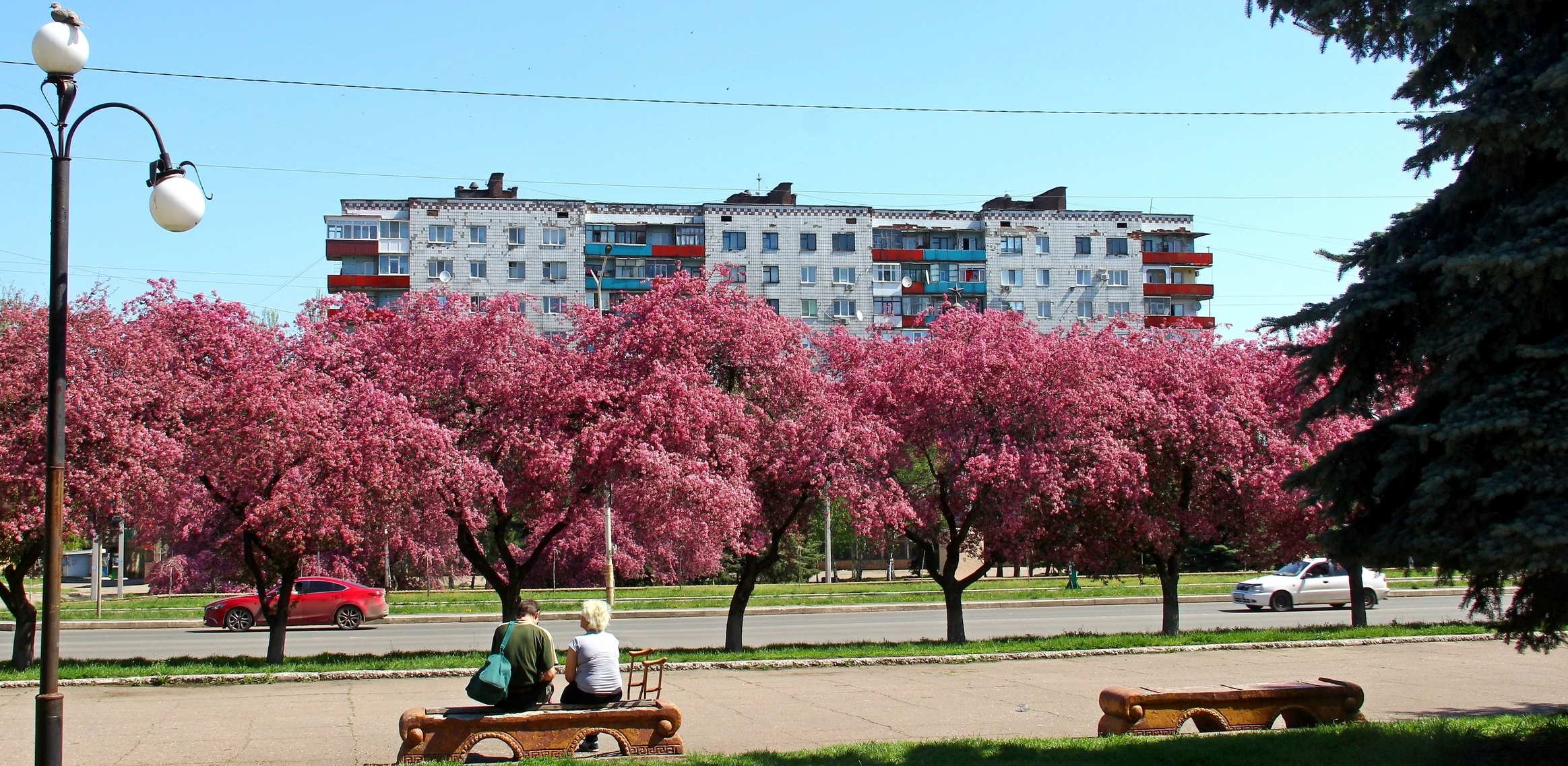
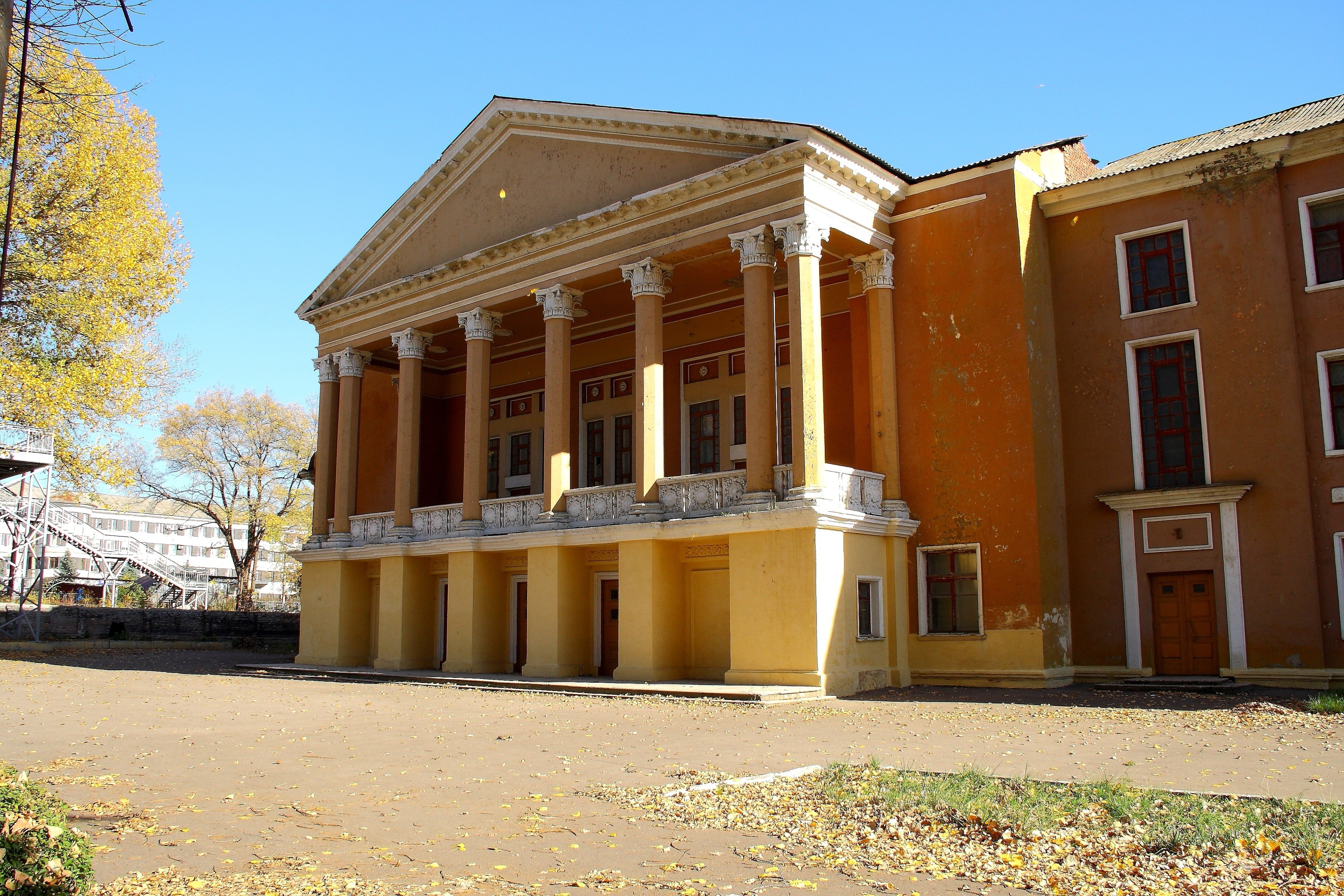
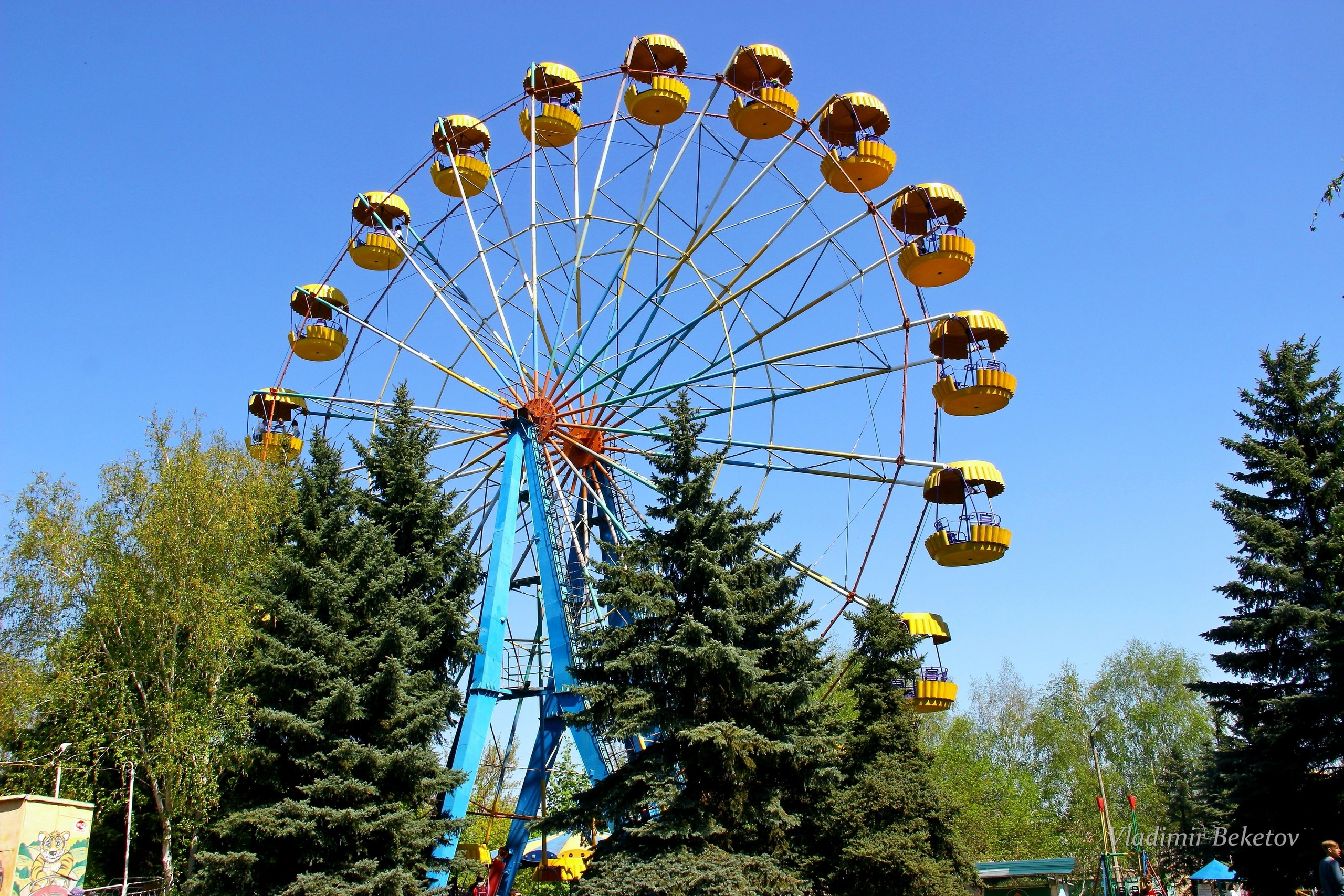
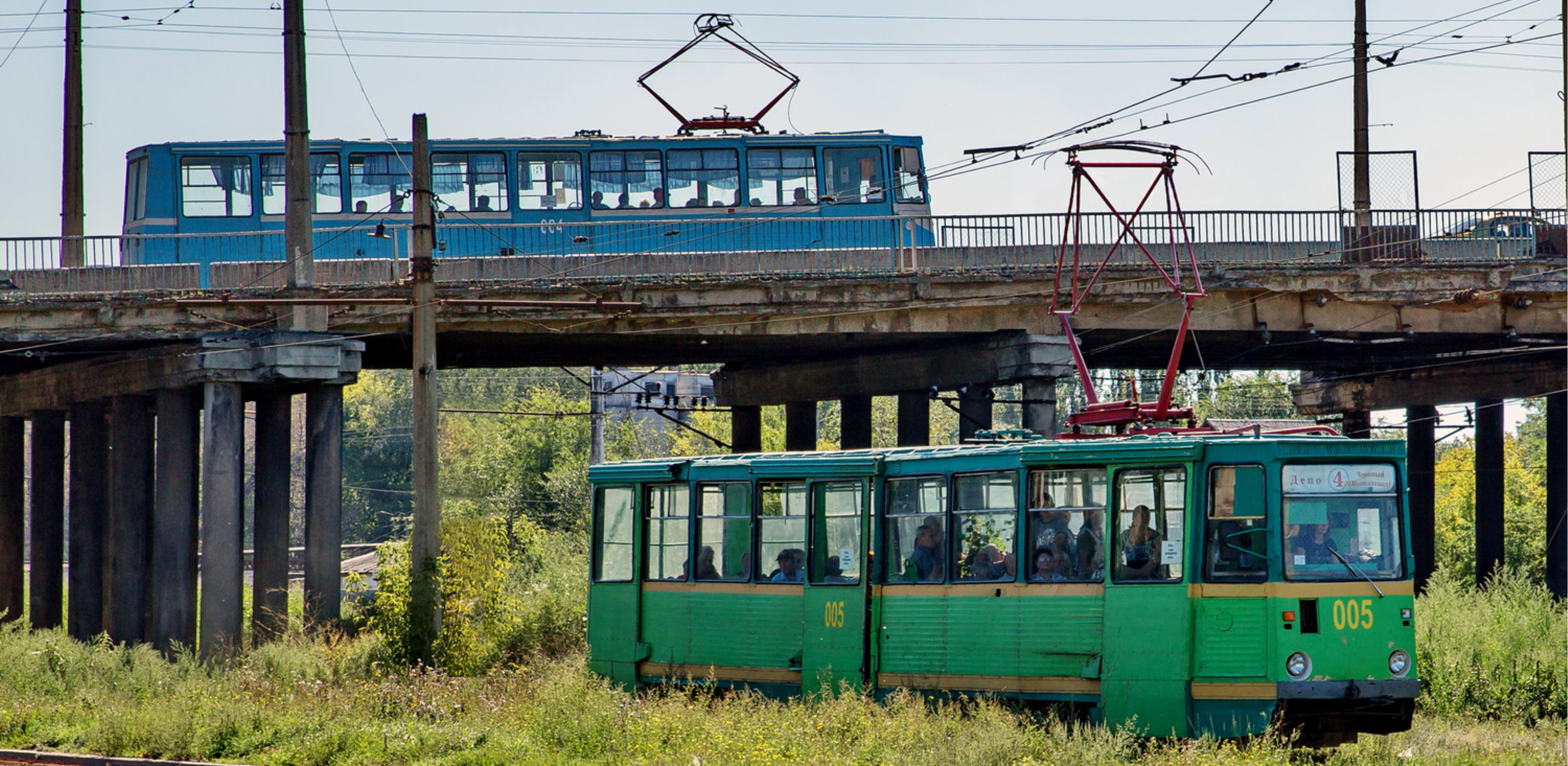
- 14-storey twin buildings Railway station Church of Job of Pochaiv Lomonosov Avenue Palace of Culture Yuvileinyi Park Kostiantynivka tram

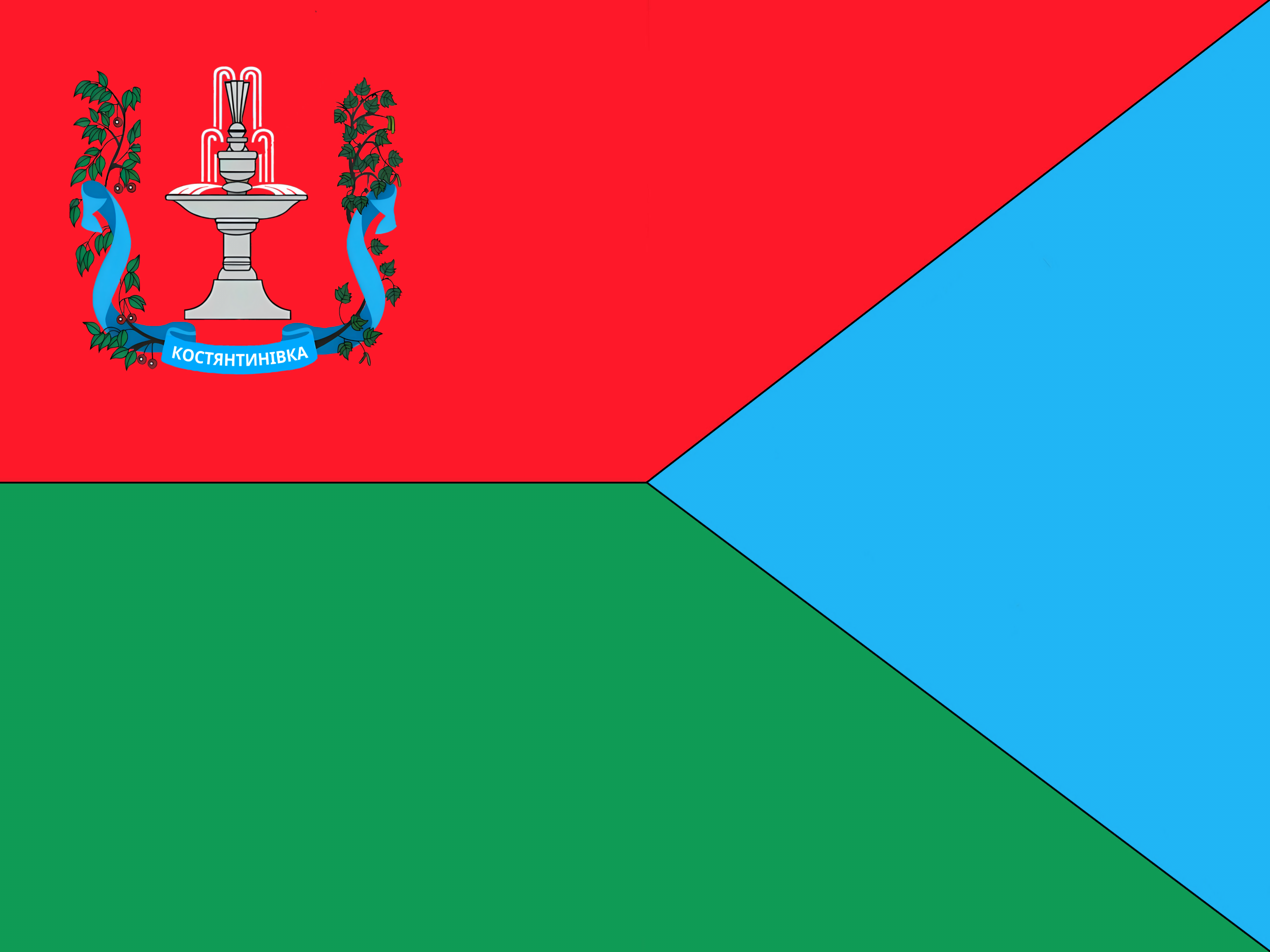
- Flag Coat of arms
- Interactive map of Kostiantynivka
- Location within Donetsk Oblast Location within Ukraine
- Coordinates: 48°32′N 37°43′E
- Country: Ukraine
- Oblast: Donetsk Oblast
- Raion: Kramatorsk Raion
- Hromada: Kostiantynivka urban hromada
- Founded: 1812
- City rights: 1932
- Founder: Panteleimon Nomikossov
- Named for: Kostiantyn (Panteleimon Nomikossov's son)

Government
  - Kostiantynivka military administration head: Serhiy Horbunov
  - Mayor: Sergey Nikolaevich Gorbunov
- Area: 66.04 km^{2} (25.50 sq mi)
- Elevation: 86 m (282 ft)
- Population (2026): 2,800
  - Density: 42/km^{2} (110/sq mi)
- Time zone: UTC+2 (EET)
  - Summer (DST): UTC+3 (EEST)
- Postal code: 85100-85129
- Area code: +380 6272

Kostiantynivka (Ukrainian: Костянтинівка, IPA: [kosʲtʲɐnˈtɪn⁽ʲ⁾iu̯kɐ]; Russian: Константиновка, romanized: Konstantinovka) is an industrial city in Donetsk Oblast, eastern Ukraine. Kostiantynivka is considered the capital of the glass industry of Ukraine. Together with neighboring cities, it forms the Kramatorsk agglomeration. During the Soviet era, the city developed into a major centre for the production of ferrous and non-ferrous metallurgy, glass, iron, zinc, steel, chemical, and construction industries, as well as an important transit railway junction. It was the administrative center of the Kostiantynivka Raion until 2020, although it did not belong to it.

After the raion was abolished, Kostiantynivka was incorporated into the Kramatorsk Raion and Kostiantynivka urban hromada. Its population was approximately 67,350 (2022 estimate). The population declined sharply due to Russian offensives towards the city, from ~15,000 in February 2025, ~8,500 in July 2025, to ~6,800 in August 2025. In late 2025, the city became an active battleground between Russian and Ukrainian military forces. By early 2026, the Donetsk Regional State Administration estimated the population of Kostiantynivka to be at ~2,800.

== Geography ==
The city is located in the northern part of the region on the Kryvyi Torets River (a tributary of the Kazennyi Torets in the Severskyi Donets basin). It is a railway junction. The distance to Donetsk is 55 km by road and 65 km by rail. The distance to Kyiv is 750 km by road and 778 km by rail.

Kostiantynivka is the southernmost city that makes up Donetsk fortress belt in Donetsk, Ukraine.

== History ==
=== Foundation ===
Archaeological research in the former Kostiantynivka Raion has shown that the region was settled during the Early Paleolithic, 150,000–100,000 years ago. From the time of the Crimean Tatars raid of 1769, there are references to Zaporozhian Cossacks settling in the territory of the Konstantinovsky District.

In 1812, Kostiantynivka was founded by a landowner named Panteleimon Nomikossov, who built the settlement in honor of his oldest son, Kostiantyn. In the mid-19th century, the village of Konstantinovka, named after the owner, arose on land inherited by the landowner's son. By 1859, 29 people lived there, while Santurinovka had 280. It was part of the Yekaterinoslav Governorate.

=== Emergence of industry ===
In 1869, with the construction of the Kursk-Kharkiv-Azov Railway, a railway station opened near Konstantinovka. In 1880 it was connected to the Kharkiv-Sevastopol Railway. The transformation of Konstantinovka into a railway hub contributed to the industrial development of the area.

In 1885, a 20-bed zemstvo hospital was opened in Dmitrievskoye. In March 1892, the Konstantinovka Railway was commissioned. The development of the city and its industrial sector were due to significant financial and managerial contributions from citizens of Belgium.

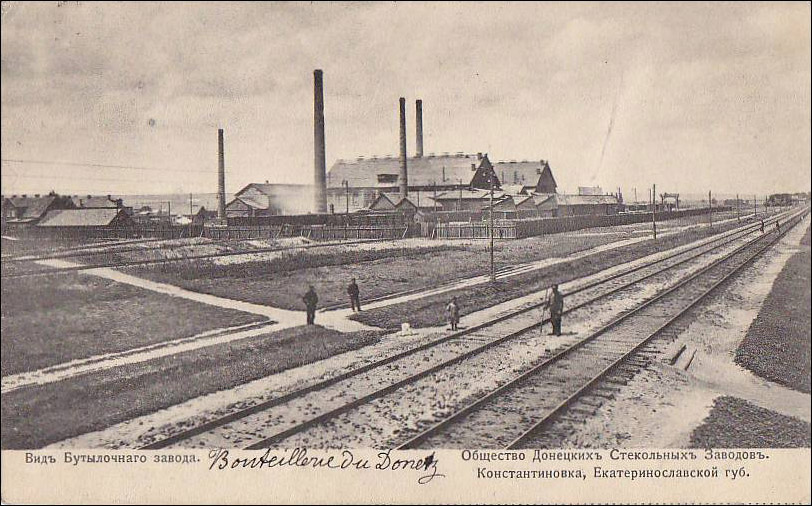
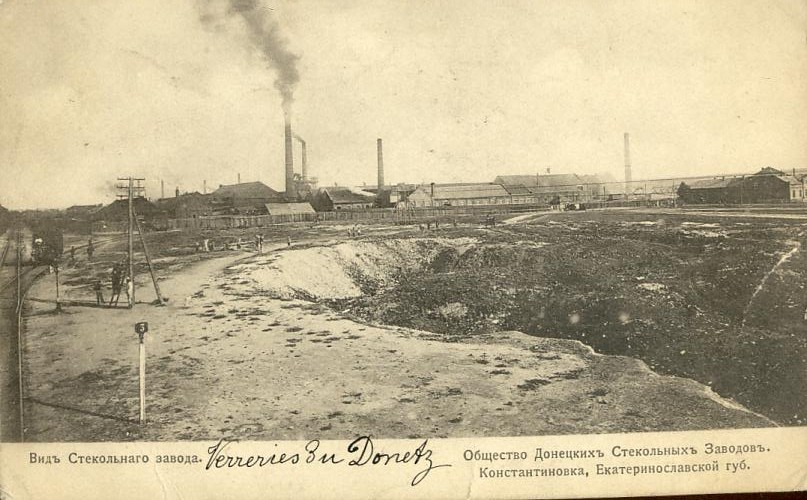
Early-20th-century view of the bottle factory and glass factory

On 11 August 1895, Podsaul Dmitry Konstantinovich Nomikosov (grandson of the city's founder, Nomikosov) received 6,756.75 rubles in gold as collateral from Belgian subjects for 210 desyatins of land in the Krivoy Torets River floodplain, along the railroad. Years 1895–1897 — A glass and chemical factory were built in Santurinovka by the Belgian Anonymous Society of Donetsk Glass and Chemical Factories.

In 1897, ceramics and iron-rolling (metallurgical) factories, as well as a bottle factory, built by Belgian entrepreneurs, began production. A majolica factory began operating. The total number of people employed at these enterprises was 2,500. The village of Konstantinovka and the station settlement became a single settlement. By 1897, its population was 3,100. In 1899, a mirror polished glass and mirror factory was built.

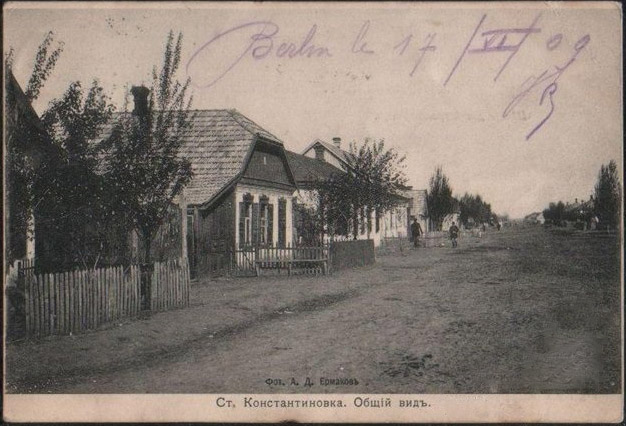
Konstantinovka in the early 20th century

In July 1900, a general strike engulfed all of Konstantinovka's factories. The unrest, which involved over 1,000 people, erupted after Belgians beat two workers. Outraged factory workers threw stones at the foreigners' cottages. The next day, all the factories were closed. A rally was held, where workers called for a fight against the exploiters. A 1902 railway directory notes that the village's monotony is reminiscent of former military settlements.

In April 1912, a citywide strike took place in the town in response to the police murder of a bottle factory worker, the revolutionary I.S. Bobylev.

By 1915, the town had two hospitals, an elementary school, a college, and a private gymnasium. The growth of industry had a positive impact on the town's population growth and made it attractive to migrant workers. The population also increased due to refugees from the country's front-line regions during the First World War. If in 1914, 1,755 people worked at the metallurgical plant, then by October 1917, there were already 2,436 people.

=== Revolution of 1917 ===
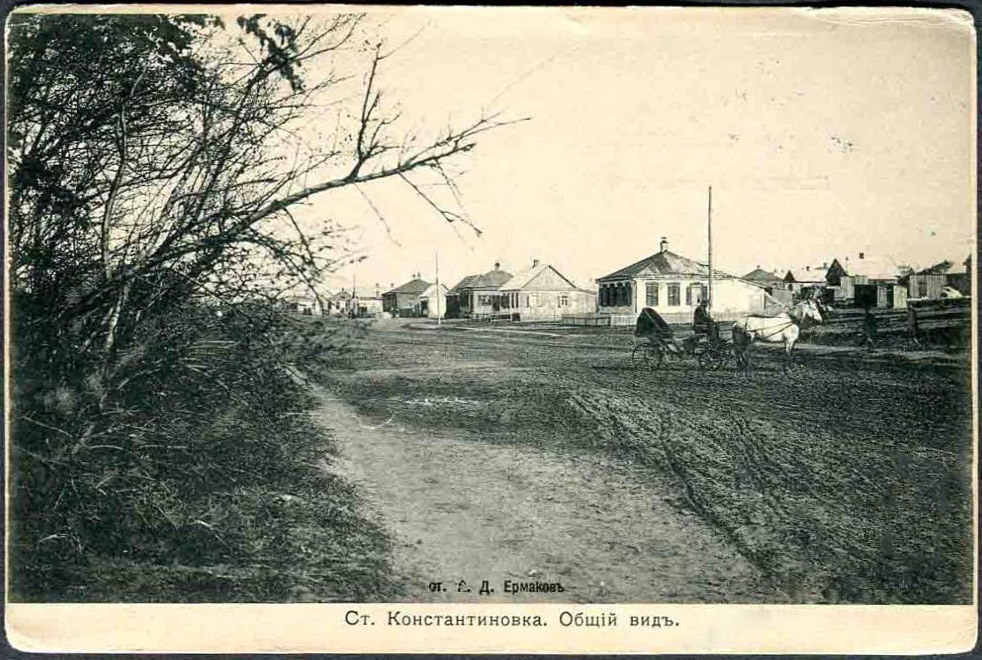
Konstantinovka before 1917

In 1917, 60% of the population of Konstantinovka could not read or write. On 2 March 1917, news of the revolutionary events in Petrograd became known in Konstantinovka. With the tsar's abdication, the bans on political and social activity in the village were lifted. This gave impetus to the development of the Ukrainian national movement among workers. The development of the political movement in the village occurred with the assistance of the Ukrainian public organization Prosvita.

On 18–20 April 1918, the UNR Army and the Donetsk group of Colonel Sikevich, together with the "army of Central European countries" (Austria-Hungary, Bulgaria, Turkey, Germany), expelled the Red Army troops and established the authority of the Ukrainian People's Republic in the city.

In April, Ukrainian state symbols appeared in the city for the first time—the flag, coat of arms, seal with the trident, and the Ukrainian hryvnia. The city's commandant was esaul Znachkovy.

In November 1918, Konstantinovka was captured by the Red Army, but in December it fell to Krasnovites (a unit of the White Movement). Subsequently, until 19 February 1919, Konstantinovka was a frontline town and changed hands more than thirty times between the "Reds" and the "Whites."

13 January 1919 (31 December 1918, Julian Calendar|Old Style) – the day of the execution of 13 bottle factory workers. Because the population did not betray the Reds, the White Guards gathered factory workers in the square near the bottle factory and shot every tenth.

On 19 February, as a result of a long battle, the Red Army drove out the Whites, however, at the end of May they were driven out by the White Army, and until December 1919 the village was under the control of the White Guards.

=== Soviet period (1919–1941) ===
At the end of December 1919, Red Army troops of the Southern Front, with the assistance of the rebels, drove Denikin's forces out of the village. In January 1920, the Konstantinovo-Druzhkovsky District was created. G. O. Bondarenko became the first chairman of the executive committee. Afterwards, it was administratively part of the Donets Governorate of Ukraine. Also, the first theater in the Donetsk region opened in Konstantinovka.

In November 1920, by decree of the Council of People's Commissars of the Ukrainian SSR, the factories were nationalized. On 7 March 1923, the Konstantinovsky district with its center in the village of Konstantinovka was created as part of the Bakhmut district. In 1925, a tannery was built (now the Konstantinovsky Extract and Tannery Factory).

On 28 February 1926, Konstantinovka was designated an urban-type settlement. Its population was 25,000. During the years of accelerated industrialization, a zinc plant (now Ukrtsink), a refractory products plant, and a bakery were built, and the Avtosteklo plant (formerly a mirror factory) was reconstructed. In the 1930s, the Konstantinovka factories produced ruby stars of the Moscow Kremlin, a sarcophagus for the Mausoleum of V. I. Lenin, marble (colored glass) for the Moscow Metro stations, and a crystal fountain for the World's Fair in New York.

On 19 September 1930, the Konstantinovka city-district newspaper Banner of Industry was founded. In December 1930, the 1st State Theater of Russian Drama of Donbass opened its doors. The city had sixteen schools with 7,000 students, and by 1939, more than 14,000 children were studying in 25 schools. Between 1931 and 1940, eight new schools were built, employing 524 teachers. In 1931, a tram line was built from the city center to the train station, and by 1940, its length had reached 10 km.

In 1932, a gliding school was established, later reorganized into a flying club. The Konstantinovsky Flying Club trained over 1,000 pilots. On 4 April 1932 by resolution of the All-Ukrainian Central Executive Committee, signed by the chairman G. Petrovsky and secretary Yury Voitsekhovsky, granted city status of urban-type settlement to Konstantinovka. By 1939, its population reached 96,000, 68% of whom were factory workers. The municipal infrastructure was reconstructed. Industrial, pedagogical, and medical schools, as well as a glass ceramics technical school, were established, the A.S. Pushkin Russian Drama Theater opened.

Since February 1934, the mirror factory was renamed "Avtosteklo". Over the course of 10 years (1928-1937), the area of green space increased fourteenfold. By 1940, adult illiteracy had been nearly eliminated. Two workers' faculties were opened. The A.S. Pushkin Russian Drama Theater, two Palaces of Culture, four clubs, and sixteen libraries were active.

=== Second World War ===
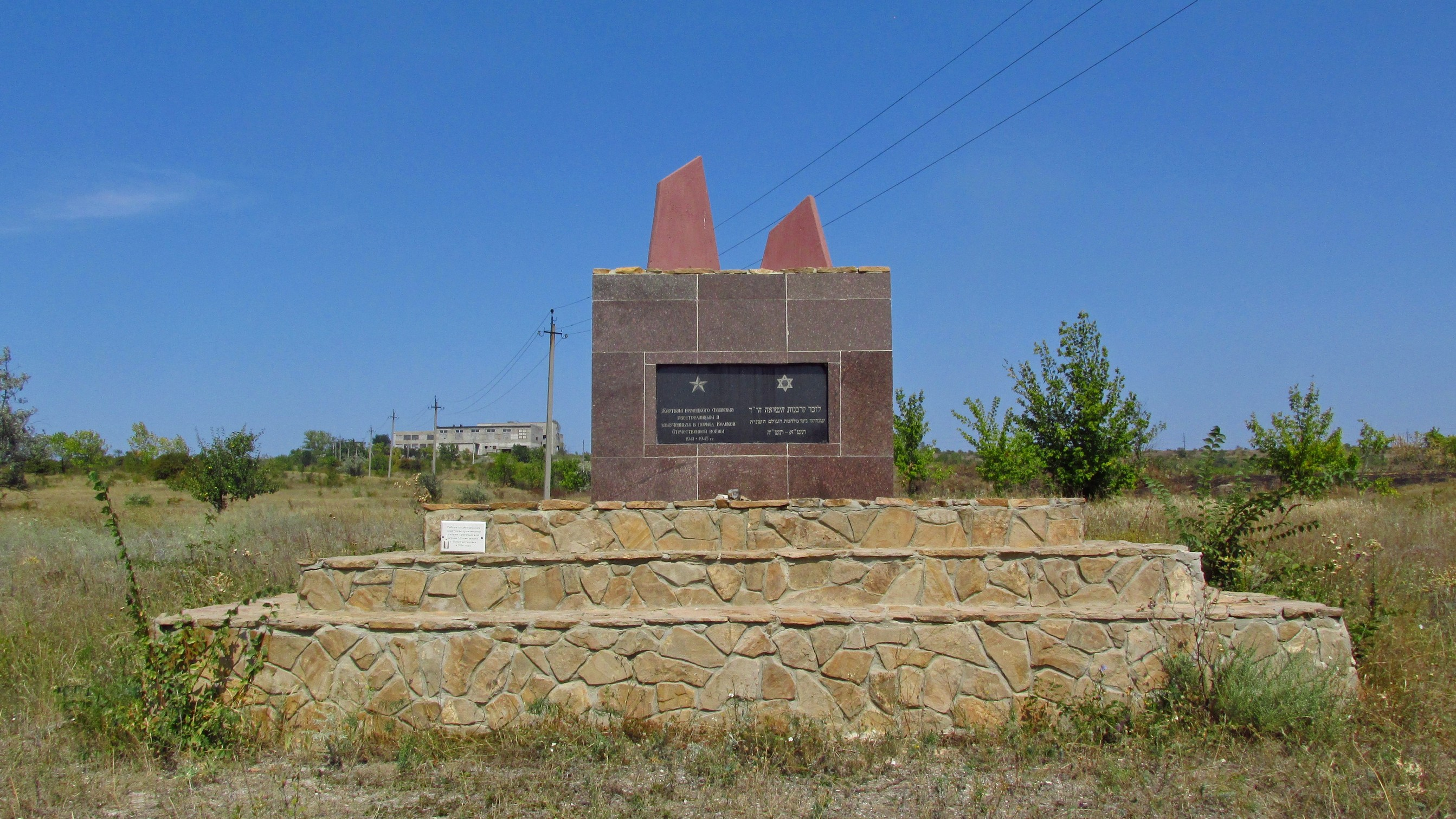
Mass grave of the victims of Nazi Germany

In mid-October 1941, fighting between the Soviet Army and the Wehrmacht began in the Konstantinovka area outside the city. On the Soviet side, soldiers of the 393rd Rifle Division fought on the approaches to the city. On 28 October 1941, the city was captured by Wehrmacht soldiers. On 1 December 1942, the German military command abolished the Directorate and placed the enterprises under its direct control. Also on that day, the Central Trade Depot opened in Konstantinovka, tasked with supplying industrial goods to the population.

During the German occupation of World War II, the Germans operated a forced labour camp in the town. Trams operated in coupled pairs, with one carriage for civilians and the other for soldiers. The tram infrastructure was destroyed by the retreating Wehrmacht in 1943 and rebuilt in 1944.

On the night of 6 September 1943, during the Donbas strategic offensive (August 1943), the 135th Red Banner Order of Kutuzov, 2nd Class Tank Brigade of the 23rd Tank Corps under the command of Lieutenant Colonel Mikhail Beznoshchenko took control of Konstantinovka. This date is subsequently celebrated as Konstantinovka City Day.

=== Post-war years ===
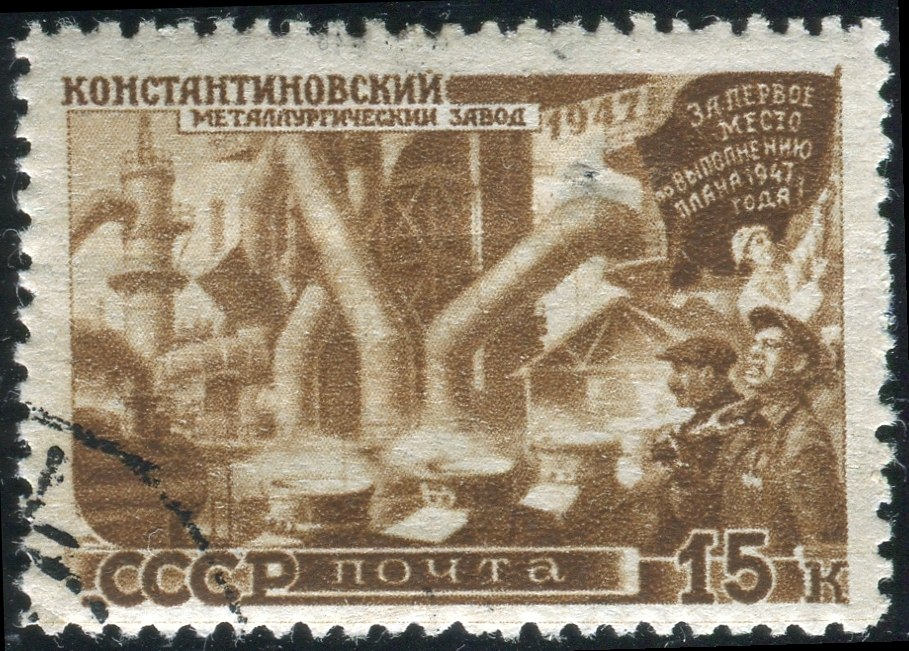
Kostiantynivka Iron and Steel Works on a postage stamp USSR, 1947

In the years following the Second World War, more than twenty industrial facilities were built in Konstantinovka. By 1949, the town's enterprises were fully restored. In 1952, the Evening Chemical College was opened. Between 1959 and 1961, the Avtosteklo Research Institute produced a new building material—sitall—from metallurgical waste (blast furnace slag) with the addition of ordinary sand. It was lightweight, strong, and durable.

In 1962, a research institute was established at the Avtosteklo plant. In 1967, the city Local History Museum was opened. Since 1968, Konstantinovka has been developing according to a unified Master Plan. In 1970, the "Monument to the Five-Year Plan Guards" was erected in honor of the 40th anniversary of the Ukrtsink plant.

Annual state appropriations for housing construction from 1959 to 1975 increased 18-fold and amounted to 3,965,000 rubles. In 1975, in honor of the 30th anniversary of the Soviet people's victory in the Second World War, the Victory Obelisk was erected. From 1981 to 1983, Secondary School No. 1, a dormitory for medical school students, a 240-bed surgical building, and City Hospital No. 5 were built. The glass factory produced 170 million champagne bottles annually—90% of the total production in this industry in the USSR.

On 7 September 1983, in the Taras Shevchenko Square, in memory of the liberating soldiers, an Eternal Flame was lit, and at the foot of the tank, a memorial plaque was installed, in which a Time Capsule was sealed with a message from veterans of the Second World War and residents of the city to their descendants in 2045. On 6 December 1990, the first issue of the region's first private newspaper, "Province", was published.

=== In independent Ukraine ===
In the 1999 Ukrainian presidential elections, the city voted for Kuchma (48.73%), Symonenko (48.43%). On 29 February 2000 - a session of the Donetsk Regional Council decided to organize the Kleban-Byk regional landscape park (RLP) in the Konstantinovsky district with 2,100 hectares, a 550-hectare reservoir, 200 species of nesting birds, and 600 species of plants.

By 15 December 2000, the City Council Executive Committee approved the current coat of arms of Kostyantynivka, designed by Herald Master Nikolai Starodubtsev. In 2002, School No. 10 was closed. The building was sold at auction for 12,398.4 hryvnias and subsequently demolished.

In the presidential election of 2004, the city voted for Yanukovych (93.75%). In May 2007, a preliminary examination confirmed the results of measurements of the radioactive spot on the edge of Konstantinovka. The radiation level is about 700 thousand microroentgens per hour (0.7 roentgens per hour with the norm being 0.000025 roentgens), and the area is contaminated with cesium-137.

On 16 January 2008, by order of the Main Department of Health of the Donetsk Regional State Administration, the inpatient department of the Konstantinovka Psychiatric Hospital was closed. On 22 May 2009, Mayor Yury Rozhenko was detained for extorting a bribe on an especially large scale. Sentenced to 5 years in prison with a 3-year deferment.

In the presidential election of 2010, the city voted for Viktor Yanukovych (90.02%); Yulia Tymoshenko received 7.07%. Serhiy Davydov won the mayoral election on 31 October 2010 (12,758 votes, or 59.9%). On 28 October 2012, city residents took part in the parliamentary elections. 60.12% (51,322 people) voted for the Party of Regions, 24.24% (20,691 people) for the Communist Party, 5.36% (4,578 people) for the All-Ukrainian Union "Batkivshchyna".

On 13 August 2013, by order of the Zolotoy Urozhay holding company, Konstantinovka Bakery No. 2, which produced sweet breads and confectionery, was shut down and closed. In April 2014, the city council closed Zelenstroy. The firm's functions were transferred to another municipal division of the executive committee, the Single Customer Service.

=== Russo-Ukrainian war ===
==== War in Donbas ====
During the War in Donbas, the town was captured in mid-April 2014 by pro-Russian separatists. The city was eventually retaken by Ukrainian forces on 7 July 2014, along with the city of Druzhkivka, shortly after the recapture of nearby cities Sloviansk and Kramatorsk. In September 2014, numerous refugees came to the town from occupied territories. People came to buy cheaper essential products, as well as to arrange pensions and social benefits in municipal institutions. At the time, the mechanism of receiving benefits and social payments for migrants at a new place of residence was simplified. The city began to operate a refugee housing center.

==== Russian invasion of Ukraine ====
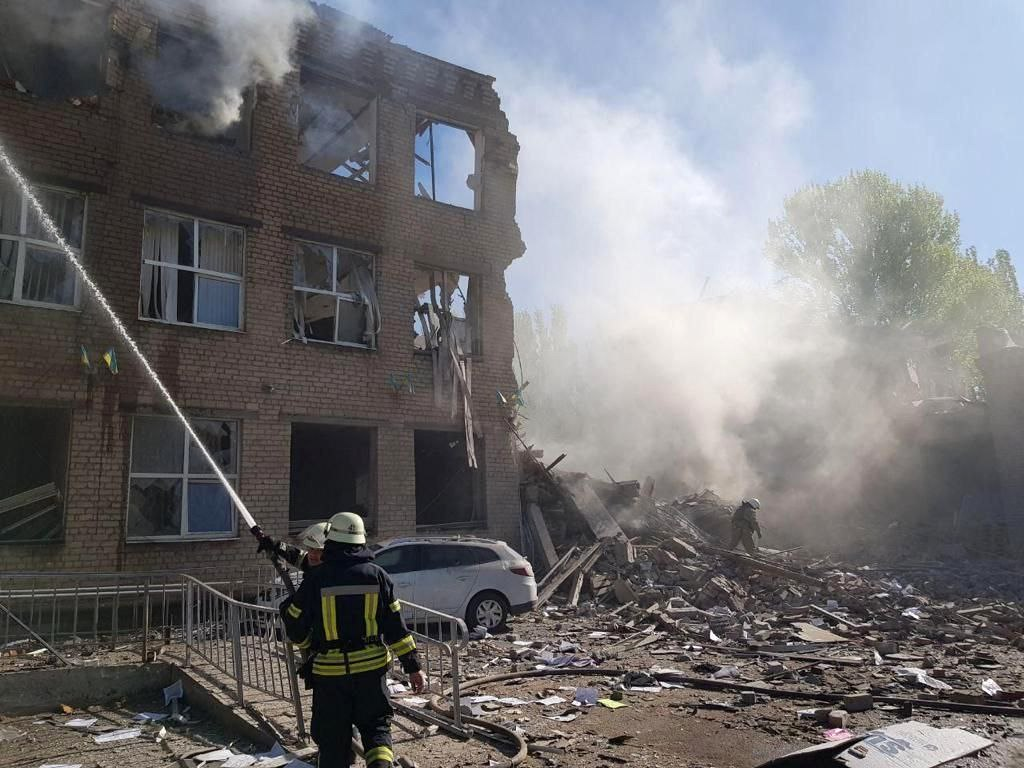
Kostiantynivka Professional Construction Lyceum after the Russian missile strike in May 2022

Attack on Kostiantynivka in September 2023

Beginning on 24 February 2022, Russia began its invasion of Ukraine. In the first few hours of the war, Kostiantynivka was struck by missiles targeting a local military base. The area was occasionally shelled and bombarded during the first phase of Russia's invasion. Kostiantynivka saw more bombardment in the second phase of the war, in which the Russians focused their attacks on eastern Ukraine. Kostiantynivka saw heavy shelling and missile attacks, targeting fuel depots and power plants. As it was near the frontlines, residents of the city could hear shelling and fighting daily. The city remained under Ukrainian control, but suffered from Russian strikes.

Russia reported on 20 March 2022 that Kostiantynivka had been hit by a Russian hypersonic Kinzhal missile, hitting a fuel depot and causing a fire in the city, and the information was confirmed by U.S. president Joe Biden.

Kostiantynivka was also shelled by the Russian Armed Forces on 17 September 2022, causing five civilian casualties and extensive destruction in the city.

A further five or more civilians were killed on 24 March 2023, when a missile fired from an S-300 anti-aircraft system hit a local so-called "invincibility point"—a humanitarian support center—in Kostiantynivka.

On 6 September 2023, a missile struck an open-air market in the middle of the day, killing 17 civilians, including a child, and injuring at least 32. The New York Times later reported that "evidence strongly suggests the catastrophic strike was the result of an errant Ukrainian air defense missile fired by a Buk launch system".

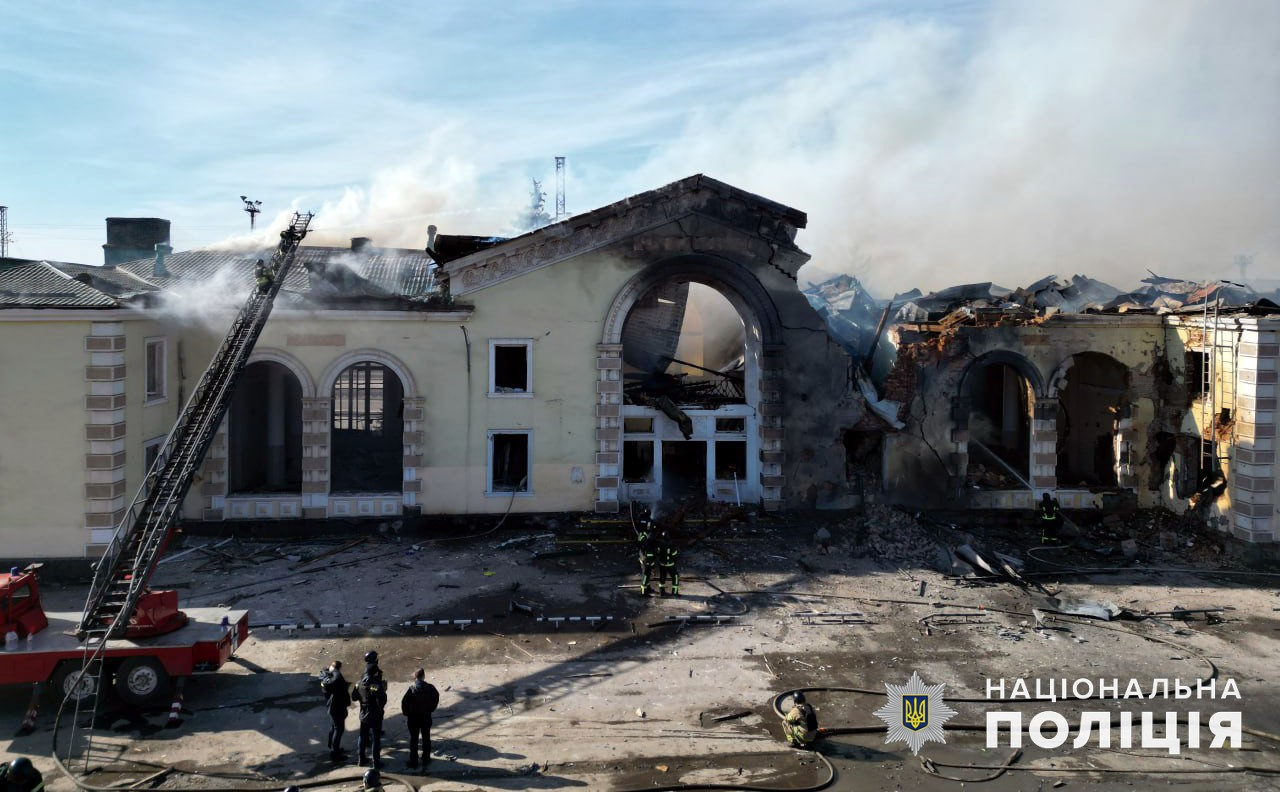
Kostiantynivka railway station after the February 2024 attack

On 25 February 2024, Russian bombing destroyed Kostiantynivka's central railway station and damaged several dozen other buildings.

On 9 August 2024, a supermarket and surrounding buildings in the city were destroyed by a Russian missile attack, killing 14 and injuring 43 others.

On 26 August 2024, Ukraine declared mandatory evacuation of the city, as well as several other villages around the city. By 7 September 2024, the population was estimated to have decreased to 25,000.

In May 2025, the Russian forces broke through Ukrainian defensive lines between the embattled Pokrovsk-Myrnohrad urban area and the city of Toretsk, occupying several settlements south-west of Kostiantynivka. According to UK Defence Intelligence, in the process, Russian forces highly likely cut the crucial supply highway H-32 (or T-0504), which connects Pokrovsk and Kostiantynivka. Ukrainian military observer Kostiantyn Mashovets claimed that the breakthrough measured a depth of more than 5 km, with a front width of close to 10 km. On 17 June 2025, Ukraine's Luhansk Operational Tactical Group claimed in a press release to have repelled a Russian force of 100 soldiers, 23 armored vehicles and 13 motorcycles near Kostiantynivka. They claimed that all the Russian personnel were killed, with 18 armored vehicles and all 13 motorcycles destroyed. Five armored vehicles were also damaged.

On 19 August 2025, Russian forces claimed to have entered Kostiantynivka from the east, the head of the Kostyantynivka Military Administration Serhiy Horbunov stated that Russian forces conducted ten FAB-250 strikes against civilian infrastructure in Kostyantynivka, damaging residential and administration buildings and a school. On 21 August 2025, Governor of Donetsk Oblast, Vadym Filashkin, said that around 6,800 people remained in the city. In early November 2025, Russian forces broke through to the southern part of the city, and the battle of Kostiantynivka started. As fighting has intensified, civilian evacuations have been described as extremely difficult.

In late November 2025, Russian president Vladimir Putin announced that "most of the town has been controlled by Russian army", but used a name of "Komsomolsk". As open-source analysts explained that it has been Russian practice since 2022 to use Soviet names for towns in Ukraine, but there was no such place named "Komsomolsk" anywhere near the front line, indicating that Putin must have referred to Kostiantynivka. By 3 July 2026, Russian forces captured the city according to the Ministry of Defence of the Russian Federation. Ukrainian sources denied it.

== Economy ==
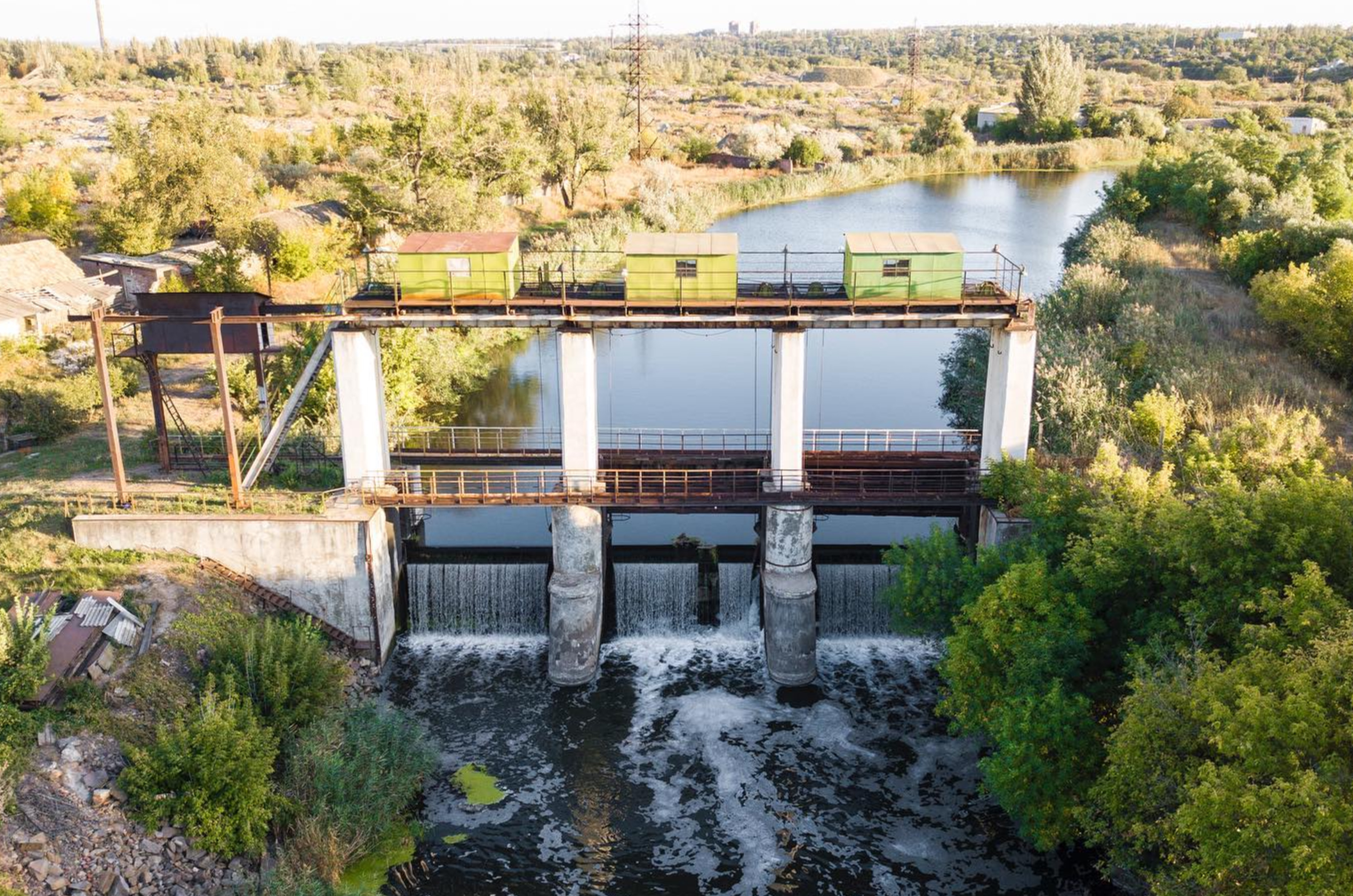
Water dam of Kostiantynivka

Until 2014, Kostyantynivka was considered the center of Ukraine's glass industry. It was home to several enterprises and Ukraine's only glass research institute, UkrGIS. Since 2005, UkrGIS has been renamed the State Enterprise "Ukrainian Glass Research Institute" (SE "UkrNIISTekla") and is the leading organization of the Ministry of Industrial Policy of Ukraine for scientific and technical support and standardization in the glass industry of Ukraine.

- Construction materials industry:
  - Spetstekhsteklo plant;
  - Kostiantynivsky Glass Factory "Stroysteklo" (formerly the October Revolution Glass Factory) - a new furnace was built, auxiliary production was modernized, and the production of household and construction glass is gradually increasing, which is sold both on the Ukrainian market and in Europe;
  - Kostiantynivsky Glassware Plant (bankrupt);
  - Kostiantynivsky Plant "Kvarsit".
- Metallurgy:
  - Kostiantynivsky Iron Foundry;
  - Ukrtsink Plant (Svinets CJSC);
  - Megatex LLC;
  - Kostiantynivsky Metallurgical Equipment Plant (produces copper using the electrolysis method).
- Mechanical Engineering:
  - ELTEKO Production Company LLC (manufactures products for enterprises in the energy, coal, mining, and other industries);
  - Kostiantynivsky Metallurgical Equipment Plant.
- Chemical Industry:
  - Kostiantynivsky Chemical Plant;
  - Kostiantynivsky Oil Weighting Agent Plant.
- Light Industry:
  - Kostiantynivsky Extract and Tannery Plant.
- Food Industry:
  - Kostiantynivsky Bakery;
  - Kostiantynivsky Confectionery Factory (which later became the basis for Konti Confectionery Company CJSC);
  - Kostiantynivsky Dairy Plant;
  - Kostiantynivsky Sausage Factory;
  - Ukrainian Bacon Factory (formerly Europroduct);
- Railway Maintenance Enterprises.

The industry employs over 40% of the total workforce in the national economy.

== Transport ==
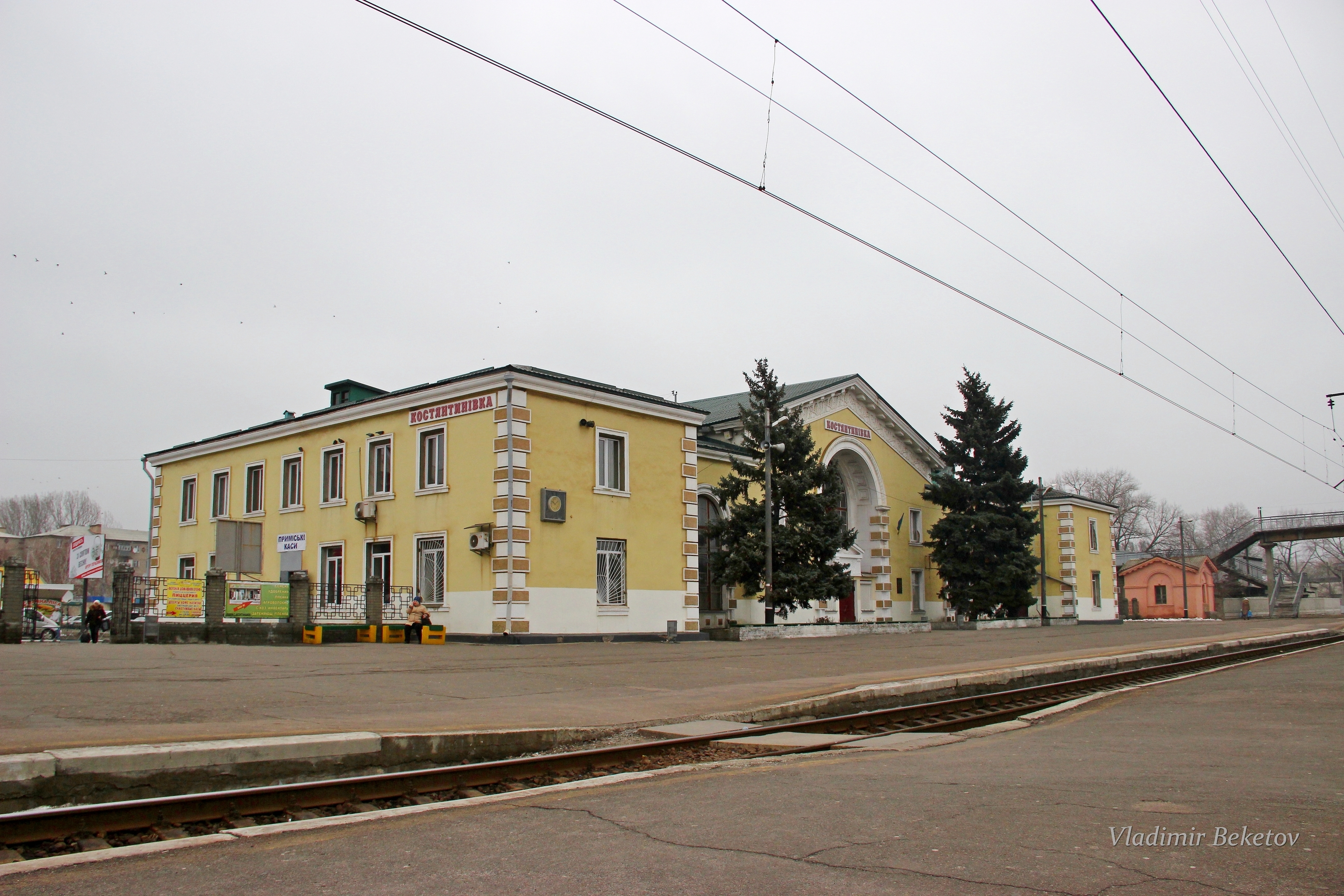
Kostiantynivka railway station

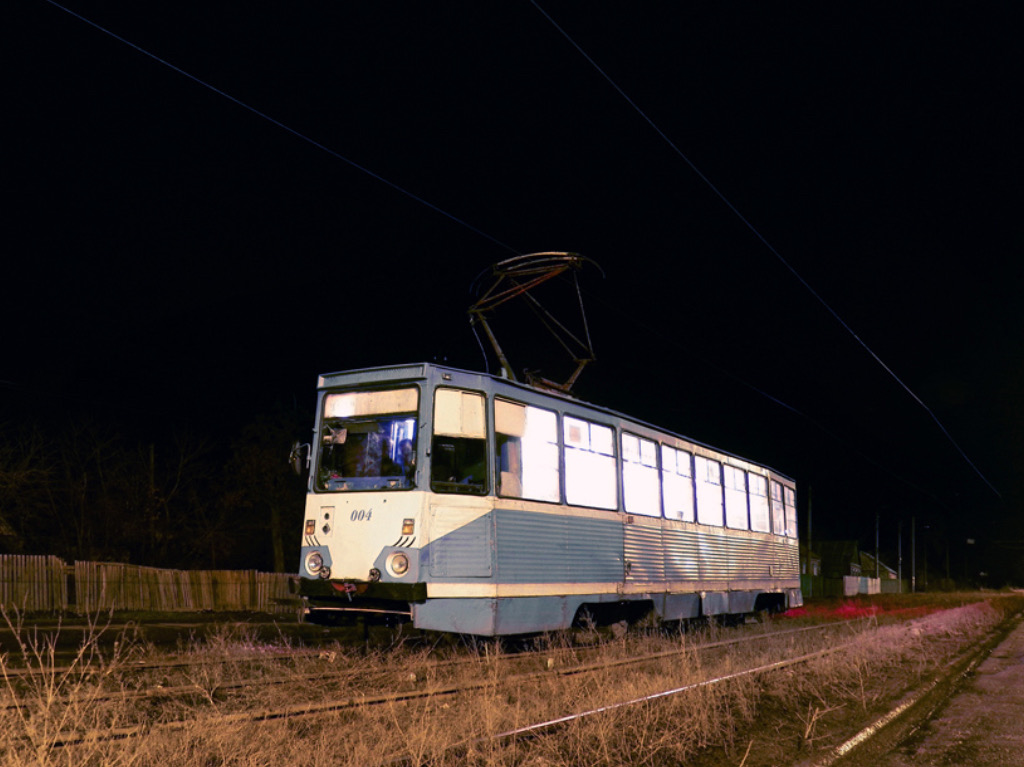
Kostiantynivka tramway system

The city is crossed by national highway H-20, highway T-0504 (Alchevsk–Bakhmut–Kostiantynivka–Pokrovsk), T-0516 (Kostiantynivka–Toretsk–Horlivka). Kostiantynivka railway station is designated as an important railway junction.

The city had a tram system which first opened in 1931, closed in 2004, and reopened in 2005. In 2012, 150 meters of overhead wires were stolen. For a while, the tram company had been unprofitable and thus threatened the closure of line 3. It remained open after complaints were made to city hall, though it nevertheless closed in 2014 due to the poor condition of the northern overpass.

As of 2015, only one car was operable, as the others all lacked bogies. The same year, tram service stopped due to construction on the Severnyi railway viaduct, closing the final line, number 4. However, work on the viaduct never occurred, and service was restarted using only one car on line 4. When 2 km of wires were stolen around 26 December 2016, the operator could not afford to repair the infrastructure, and the network closed on 29 March 2018.

== Demographics ==
Historical population
Year	Pop.	±%
1926	25,404	—
1939	95,807	+277.1%
1959	88,723	−7.4%
1970	105,446	+18.8%
1979	112,020	+6.2%
1989	107,562	−4.0%
2001	95,111	−11.6%
2011	79,211	−16.7%
2022	67,350	−15.0%
2025 (August)	6,800	−89.9%
2025 (November)	5,000	−26.5%

As of the Ukrainian Census of 2001:

Ethnicity

- Ukrainians: 59.3%
- Russians: 37.7%
- Armenians: 1.0%
- Belarusians: 0.5%
- Azerbaijanis: 0.3%
- Jews: 0.2%

Language

- Russian: 78.1%
- Ukrainian: 21.0%
- Armenian: 0.5%
- Belarusian: 0.1%

== Social sphere ==
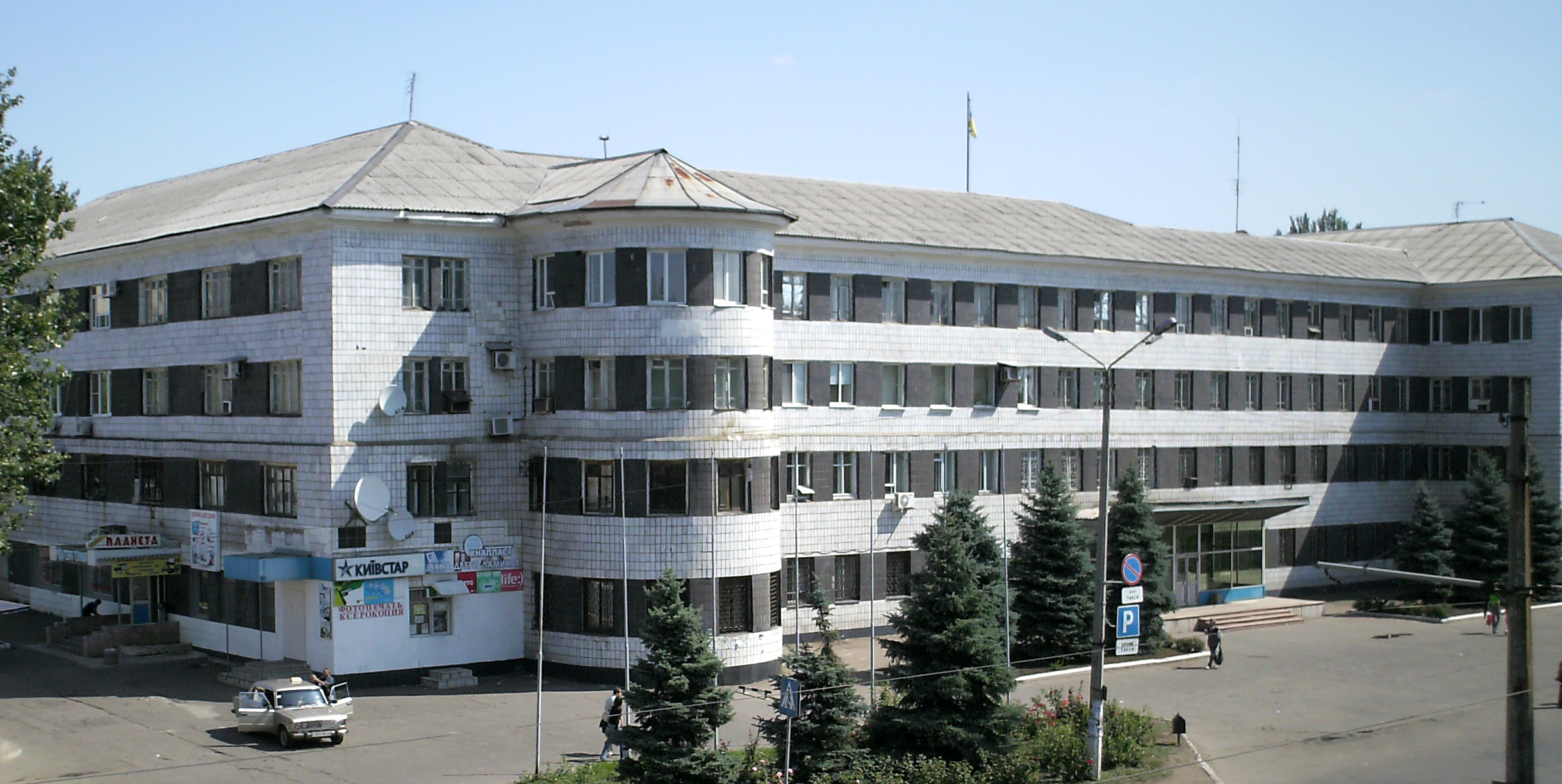
Kostiantynivka City Council.

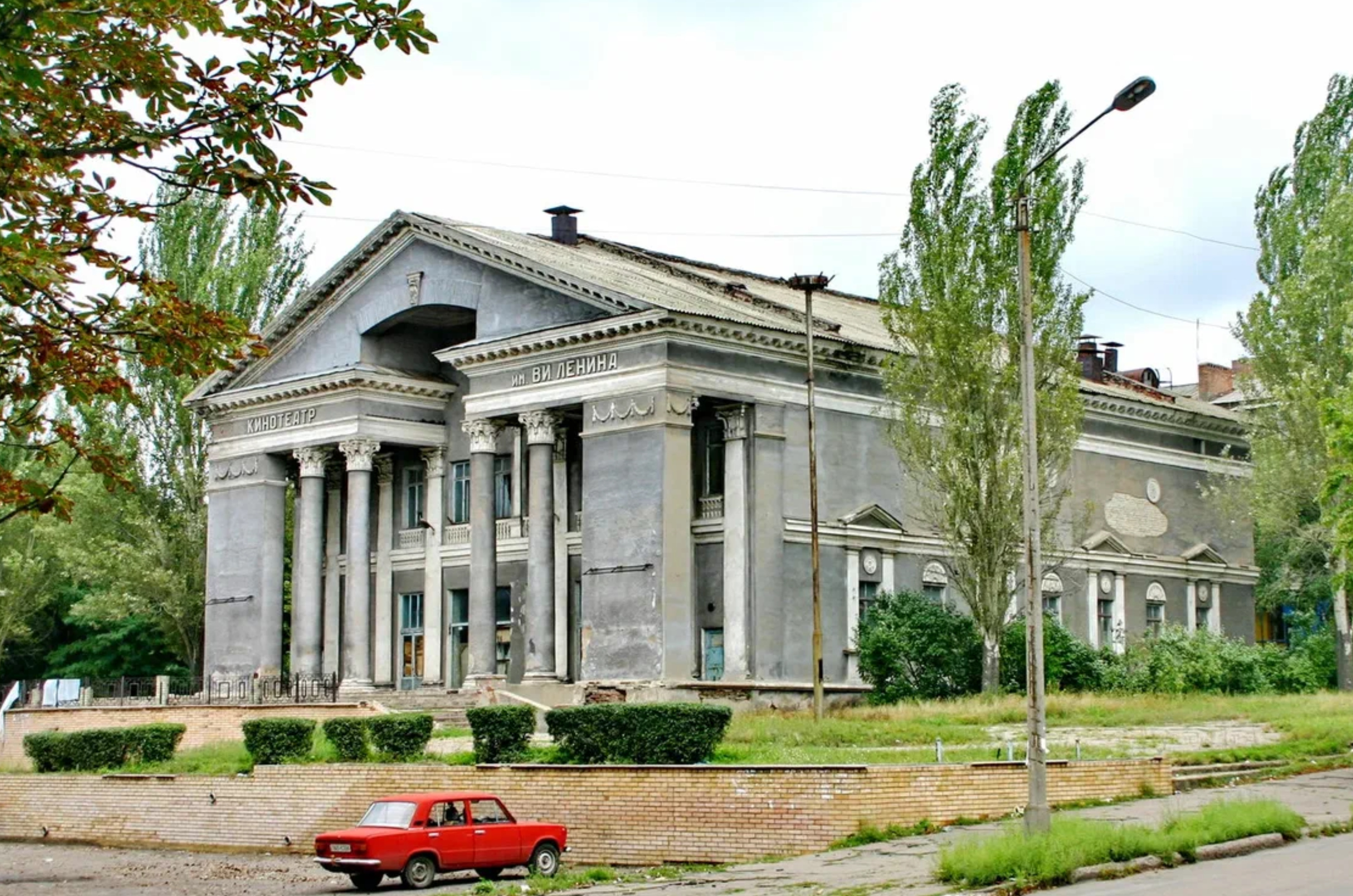
Cinema in the city.

The city has 17 schools, 20 kindergartens, 2 technical schools, 1 university, 4 university branches, 2 vocational schools, 1 cinema, 1 local history museum, 3 libraries, 3 cultural centers (1 is active), and the Metallurg stadium.

- Kostiantynivsky Branch of the Kramatorsk Institute of Economics and Humanities
- Kostiantynivsky Educational and Consulting Center of Donetsk National University
- Kostiantynivsky Industrial College of Donetsk National Technical University ("KIT DonNTU" Svobody Ave./Shmidta St.)
- Kostiantynivsky College of Luhansk National Agrarian University "KT LNAU"
- Kostiantynivsky Gymnasium (Shmidta St.)
- Kostiantynivsky Technical Lyceum (Toretska St.)
- Kostiantynivsky Professional Construction Lyceum (Yevropeyska St.)
- Medical College (Suvorova St.)
- Zhovten Palace of Culture (Svobody Ave.)
- Berestovy Palace of Culture (Heroyiv Pratsi St.)
- Kostiantynivska Central District Hospital (Svobody Ave.)
- NSUZI Kostiantynivska School of Arts (6 Peremohy Square)
- Suputnyk Cinema

== Notable people ==
- Bohdan Butko (born 1991), Ukrainian football player
- Oleksandra Kuzhel (born 1953), Ukrainian politician
- Tetyana Kryvobok (born 1972), Ukrainian runner
- Serhiy Kulyk (born 1964), Ukrainian military officer and former head of the Ukrainian State Security Administration
- Yevhen Levchenko (born 1978), Ukrainian football player
