= 25 May 2024 Kharkiv missile strikes =

- Part of Russian strikes on Kharkiv and 2024 Kharkiv offensive
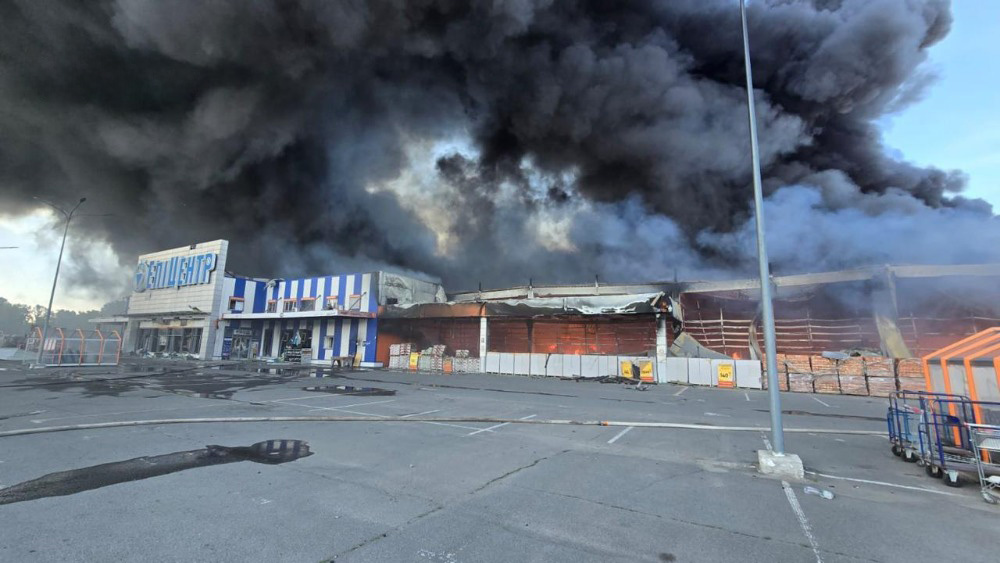
- Hypermarket Epicentr K after the bombing
- Location: Kharkiv, Ukraine
- Date: 25 May 2024
- Attack type: Missile and guided bomb strike
- Deaths: 19
- Injuries: 65
- Perpetrator: Russia

Air strikes on Kharkiv were carried out by the Russian Armed Forces in four locations on 25 May 2024. At least one UMPB D-30SN bomb was dropped at an Epicentr K hypermarket, destroying it. Russian forces dropped another bomb on the central park of culture and recreation, but it did not detonate. In the evening, Russian forces hit a street in a dense residential area of the city. At least two of the victims killed in the airstrike were Epicentr store employees.

According to the Kharkiv Oblast Governor, 19 people were killed as a result of the attacks and at least 65 were injured.

== Background ==
The strikes happened amid an ongoing limited Russian offensive in Kharkiv Oblast which started on 10 May. The city of Kharkiv has faced frequent attacks since months prior and its energy infrastructure has already been severely damaged. Ukraine has also increased shelling of the Belgorod region.

On 19 May 6 people were killed in a Russian strike on the outskirts of Kharkiv, according to the Regional Prosecutor's Office. The same day, three Ukrainian drones were shot down over Belgorod region, burning a church roof, according to local officials. On 23 May, Russian forces fired 15 missiles at Kharkiv, resulting in the death of 7 people and wounding 20.

Russian forces have previously struck at six other Epicentr shopping centers in Bucha, Nikopol, Mariupol, Kharkiv, Kherson and Chernihiv.

== Attack ==
=== Lyceum and cars strike ===
At 00:35 and 00:47 on 25 May, Russian troops fired S-300 missiles at the Slobodsky district of Kharkiv and destroyed part of a lyceum, and also damaged 31 cars.

=== Shopping center strike ===
Videos of the strike outside the store

Video of the strike inside the store

At approximately 16:00, Russian forces struck the Kyivskyi District of Kharkiv with at least one UMPB D30-SN aerial bomb, allegedly from the Belgorod oblast of Russia. The strike was conducted on an Epicentr construction hypermarket and resulted in three large explosions. The market was estimated to have contained about 120 people at the time of the missile strikes. Interior Minister Ihor Klymenko reported that the missile strikes caused a fire covering 13,000 square metres that took 16 hours to fully put out. According to the Kharkiv Oblast Governor, the attack on the hypermarket killed 19 and injured at least 54 people, three of which were injured seriously. At least two of the victims killed in the airstrike were Epicentr store employees.

Russian state media cited a security source as saying, that a "military warehouse and command post" were set up in the shopping center and claimed that the Ukrainian Armed Forces were using "human shield tactics".

=== Failed strike on Central park ===
At 17:00, Russian forces dropped another bomb on the central park of culture and recreation, and hit the area near the sports ground, but the bomb did not explode and caused no casualties. Ukrainian rescuers then cleared the sports ground.

=== Residential development strike ===
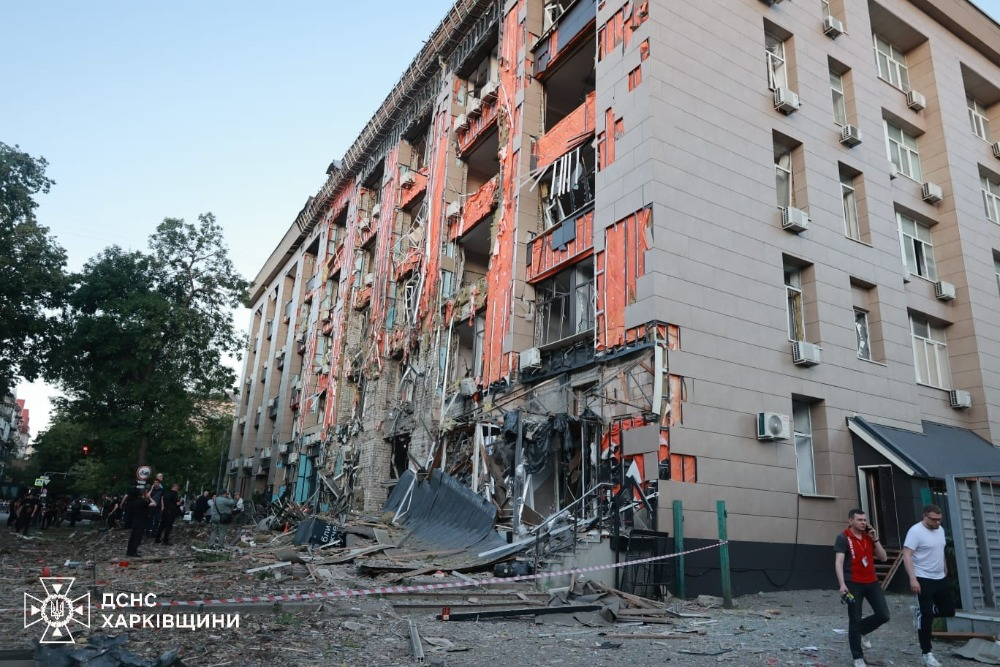
Destructions in the residential area

At 19:00, Russian forces hit a dense residential area in the center of the city with an S-300 missile, striking the pavement next to a residential complex housing a cafe, post office, and beauty salon and wounding 18 people (including a 14-year-old teenager).

== Reactions ==
In response to the attacks, President Volodymyr Zelenskyy said in his nightly address that the attacks were "yet another example of Russian madness". Zelenskyy also called for increased air defenses to keep Kharkiv and other cities in the country safe.

French President Emmanuel Macron on social media platform X wrote that the strike on the superstore was "unacceptable."

Senior United Nations official Denise Brown described the attack on the shopping center as ″utterly unacceptable″, adding that attacks by Russian forces hitting civilians and civilian infrastructure must stop.

== See also ==
- Kharkiv strikes (2022–present)
- April 2022 Kharkiv cluster bombing
