= Nova Poshta =

Private Ukrainian postal and courier company

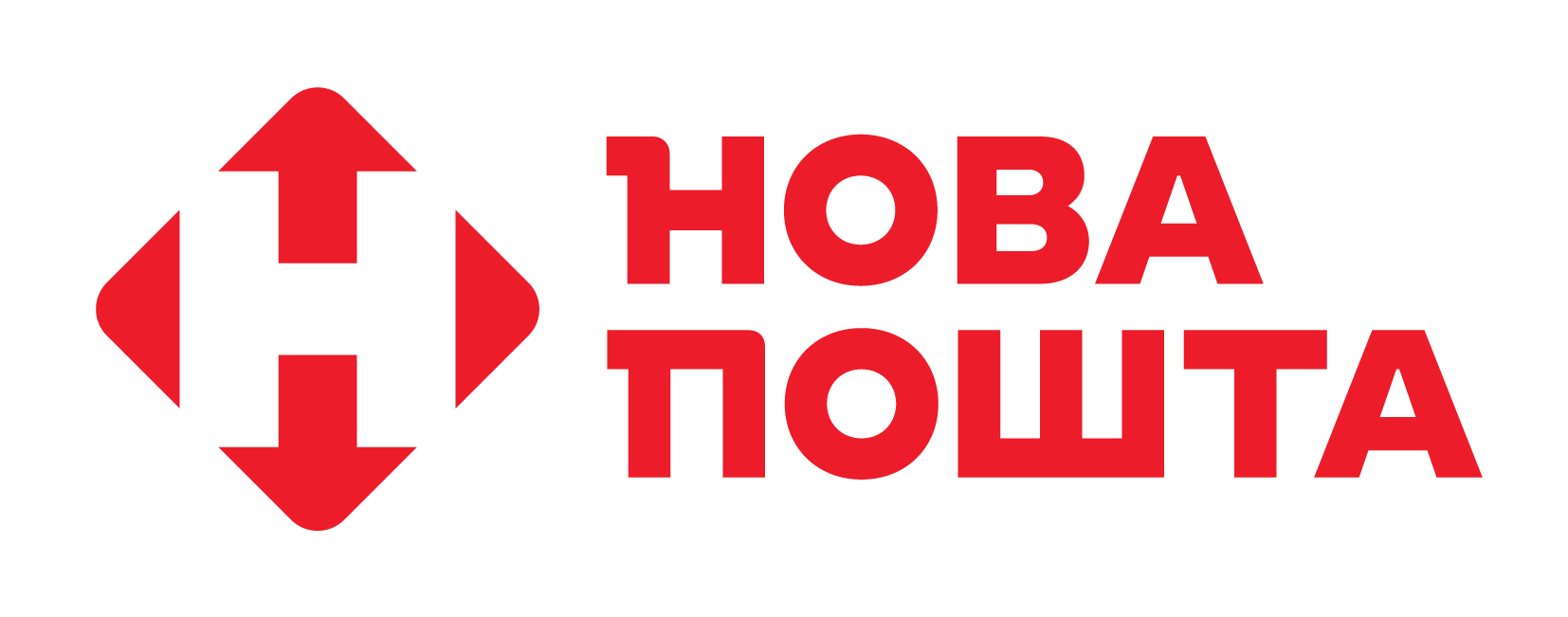
- Native name: Нова пошта
- Romanized name: Nova Poshta
- Industry: Courier and parcel delivery
- Founded: 13 February 2001
- Founder: Volodymyr Popereshniuk
- Headquarters: Kyiv, Ukraine
- Area served: Ukraine; Moldova; Poland; Lithuania; Czech Republic; Romania; Germany; Slovakia; Estonia; Latvia; Hungary; Italy; France; Austria; United Kingdom; Spain; Netherlands
- Services: Package delivery, EMS
- Revenue: 44,779,857,000 hryvnia (2024)
- Operating income: 4,407,990,000 hryvnia (2024)
- Net income: 2,500,331,000 hryvnia (2024)
- Total assets: 23,101,706,000 hryvnia (2024)
- Number of employees: 34,106 (2024)
- Parent: NOVA Group
- Website: novapost.com/en-ua

Nova Poshta (Ukrainian: Нова пошта), called Nova Post outside Ukraine, is a private Ukrainian postal and courier company that provides logistics and related services for individuals and businesses. Its main competitor is the country's post office, Ukrposhta.

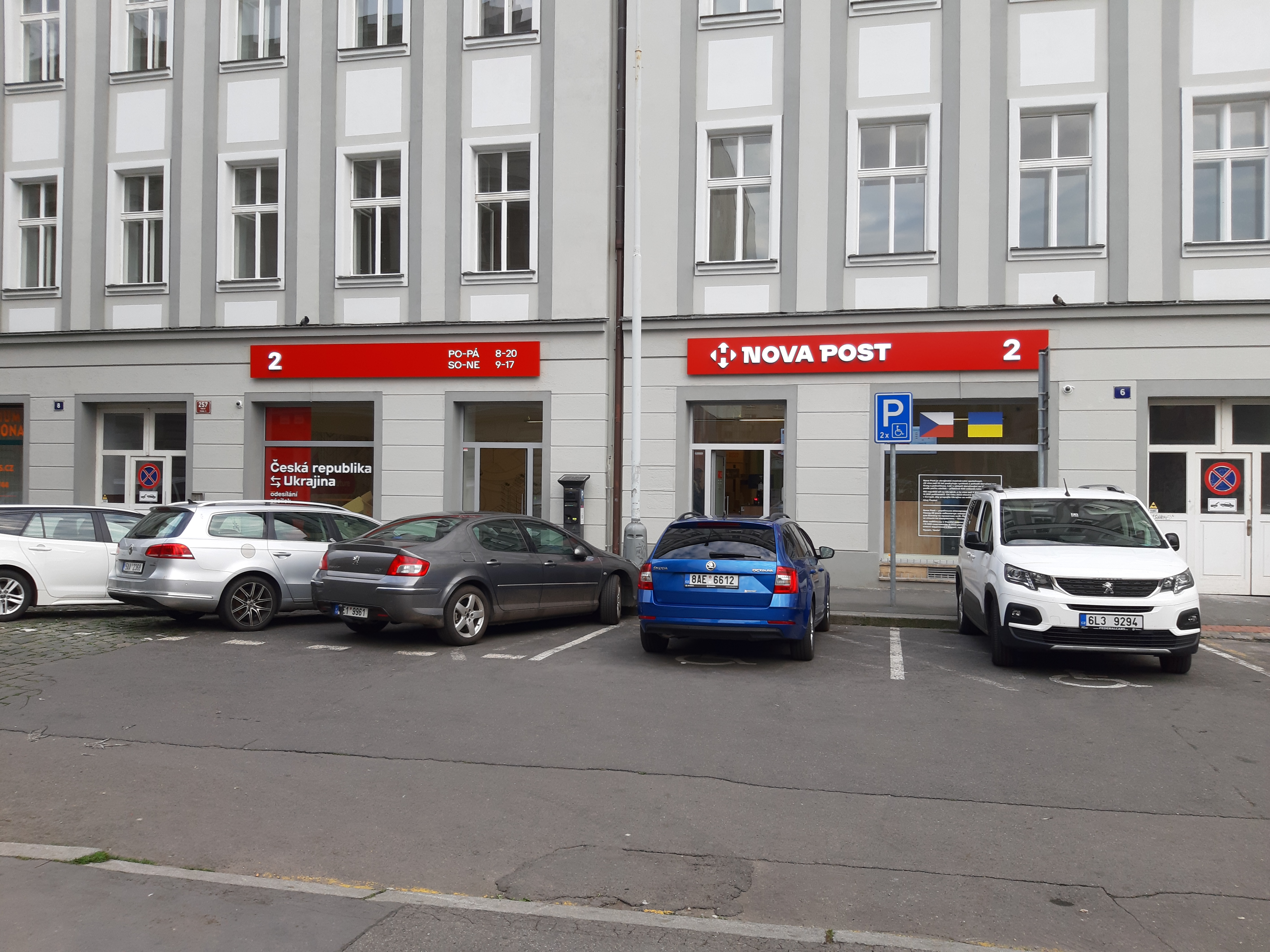
A branch of Nova Post in Prague, Czech Republic

== History ==
The company was founded in 2001 by Vyacheslav Klymov [uk] and Volodymyr Popereshnyuk.

In 2018, the company delivered over 174 million shipments, through the company's 6,000 branches throughout the country. In 2015, the company expanded internationally to the nearby countries of Georgia and Moldova. However, it left Georgia in 2021 without explaining the reasons. As of October 2022, Nova Poshta Global currently has offices in Kyiv, London, and New York, as well as operations centers in Poland, Turkey, Germany, Spain, Italy, Latvia, Lithuania, Estonia, Czech Republic, France, Romania, Slovakia, Hungary, Moldova, Canada, China, Thailand, Japan, Taiwan, Hong Kong, New Zealand, Malaysia, Singapore, Indonesia, South Korea, Australia, and Philippines.

In 2020, the "Nova Poshta" brand became one of the TOP-3 most expensive in Ukraine.

The company has 32 thousand employees, and is among the best employers of Ukraine in 2020–2021.

On 24 February 2022, on the first day of Russia's full-scale invasion of Ukraine, Nova Poshta donated ₴25 million for the needs of the Ukrainian army. Also, the company launched the Humanitarian Nova POSHTA project, which is intended for free delivery of parcels to the military and victims of war.

In July, the main company announced that it would be opening non-Global branches in nearby European countries, planning to open in Poland before the end of 2022. In October, the first office opened in Warsaw, with another in Kraków, as well as Wrocław, Rzeszów, and Poznań, on the way. In October 2023, a new branch opened in Bratislava, Slovakia. In 2024, Nova Poshta opened its first branches in France (Nice), Italy (Rome), Spain (Barcelona), and the UK (London).

== Finances ==
As a result of 2019, Nova Poshta paid over ₴2.7 billion in taxes and was ranked 27th in the list of the top 100 largest companies in Ukraine by the amount of tax payments.

Nova Poshta is among the TOP-20 largest taxpayers in Ukraine. In 2020, the company paid 5 billion hryvnias.

== Services ==
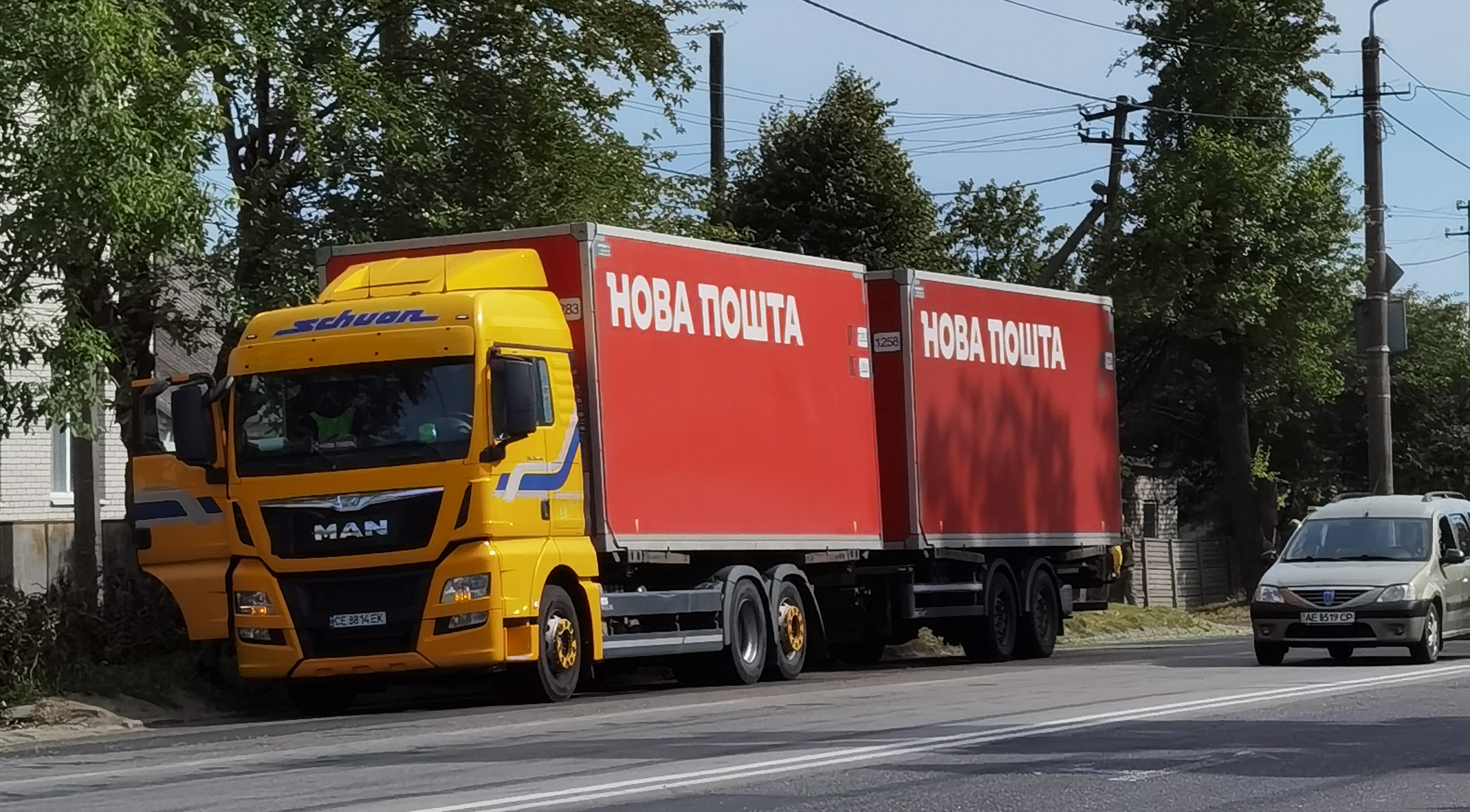
Nova Poshta truck in Dnipro.

Nova Poshta is the group of companies that provides clients — both businesses and individuals, logistics and related services, including express delivery of documents, freight, and parcels. The group includes Ukrainian and foreign companies, in particular, NovaPay, Nova Poshta Global, and Nova Poshta Moldova.

Nova Poshta has more than 8,700 branches throughout Ukraine - in all cities and in every fourth village. The Company continues to open new branches in the villages and builds the network of automated parcel terminals in the cities. For November 2021, the network of automated parcel terminals of Nova Poshta has more than 8,500 devices.

In 2020, the company delivered 327 million parcels and cargo for 14 million of its customers.

== Infrastructure ==
Nova Poshta has the modern sorting infrastructure in the million-plus cities and regional centers of the country. The largest of them are in Kyiv, Lviv, Khmelnytsky, Kharkiv and Dnipro. The terminals are equipped with automated equipment and can sort from 8.5 thousand to 50 thousand parcels per hour.

In addition, the 1/3 of Nova Poshta's terminals use robots to sort small parcels and cargo.

The Nova Poshta also tests innovative delivery methods. In the summer of 2021, the company delivered cargo by drone from Kyiv to Kharkiv, covering the distance of 480 km.

== Russia-Ukraine war impact ==
On 21 October 2023, Russian forces hit the Nova Poshta terminal in the Kharkiv region, killing six employees and injuring 17. A week later, two victims died in the hospital.

On 1 May 2024, a Russian missile strike in Odesa destroyed 904 parcels valued at UAH 3 million, weighing over 15 tonnes at the Nova Poshta depot. No employees were harmed.

On 29 July 2026, a Russian drone strike hit a Nova Poshta terminal in Poltava, killing one and causing a fire.

On 30 July 2026, for the fifth time, a Russian drone strike hit a Nova Poshta terminal in Dnipropetrovsk. No employees were harmed.

On 27 October 2026, Viachеslav Klymov stated at the Kyiv International Economic Forum that Nova Poshta has set up private air defense capabilities and has shot down multiple Russian attack drones.
