= Novoarkhangelsk =

Novoarkhangelsk may refer to:

- Sitka, Alaska
- Novoarkhanhelsk, an urban-type settlement in Ukraine
