= September 2023 Kostiantynivka missile strike =

Incident during the Russian invasion of Ukraine

Kostiantynivka missile strike
- Part of attacks on civilians in the Russian invasion of Ukraine
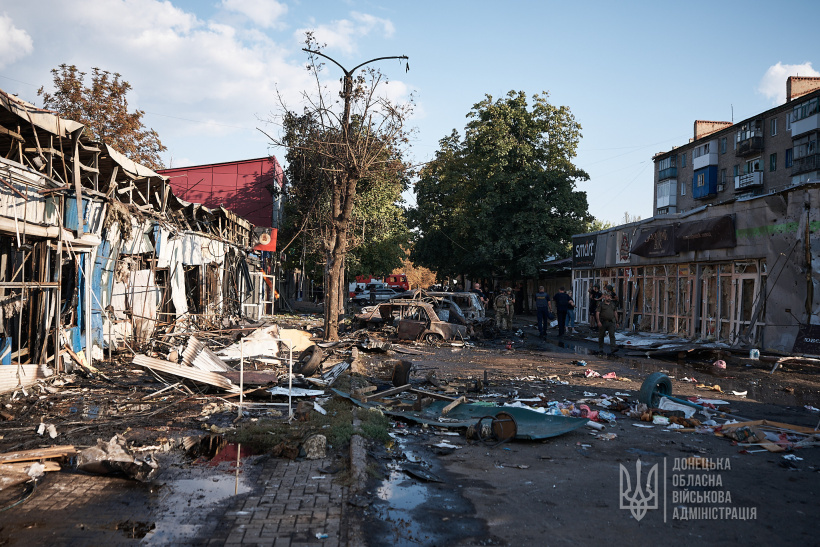
- Aftermath of the missile strike
- Location: Kostiantynivka, Ukraine
- Date: 6 September 2023 about 14:00 (EEST)
- Attack type: Missile strike
- Deaths: 15+
- Injuries: 32+

In the morning of 6 September 2023, a missile struck an open market in downtown Kostiantynivka, Ukraine. The strike left at least 15 people dead, including a child and a couple in their 50s who were selling flowers at the market, and at least 32 wounded. An investigation by The New York Times suggested that the missile was fired from Ukrainian positions west of Kostiantynivka from a Buk system, based on video and audio footage from near the launch site and from the town, and analyses of the explosion and its aftermath. Security Service of Ukraine spokesman said that they continue an official investigation of the attack, but currently believe it was a S-300 missile launched by Russian forces.

== Initial response ==
(Ukrainian) Video address from the National Police of Ukraine, with security footage of the impact and firefighting efforts shown.

The strike took place just hours after United States Secretary of State Antony Blinken landed in Kyiv to meet with Ukrainian officials. Ukraine's President Volodymyr Zelenskyy condemned the attack, describing it as "utter inhumanity" saying "Russian terrorists have attacked a regular market, shops, and a pharmacy, killing innocent people." Ukrainian Prime Minister Denys Shmyhal wrote that "There will be a just retribution for everything."

The United Nations Humanitarian Coordinator for Ukraine, Denise Brown, stated Russia was responsible and condemned it for attacking civilians: "It is an unfortunate day for Ukraine. This deeply tragic and unacceptable event is just another example of the suffering that Russia's invasion inflicts on civilians across the country... Intentionally directing an attack against civilians or civilian objects or intentionally launching an attack knowing it will cause disproportionate civilian harm is a war crime."

France declared the strike a Russian war crime. Its foreign ministry said: "By deliberately targeting a market and people who were going about their most basic daily activities, Russia is, once again, guilty of committing war crimes with its strategy of terror and must be held responsible for them."

== The New York Times report ==
The Ukrainian authorities initially prevented The Times journalists from accessing the scene of impact. Subsequently, reporters were able to inspect the site of the explosion, where they collected fragments of the missile and interviewed witnesses. On 18 September 2023, The New York Times reported that the explosion was probably caused by an errant Ukrainian missile, stating that "missile fragments, satellite imagery, witness accounts, and social media posts, strongly suggests the catastrophic strike was the result of an errant Ukrainian air defense missile fired by a Buk launch system". They concluded from reviewing security camera footage that the missile flew from the direction of Ukrainian-held territory, indicated by a reflection of the missile on the roofs of cars, and that just before the strike pedestrians turned to look toward the north-west. Two anonymous bomb-disposal experts concluded that fragments and damage were most consistent with a missile fired by a mobile Buk anti-aircraft system. Evidence was also found from witnesses and social media that the Ukrainian military had launched two surface-to-air missiles from the town of Druzhkivka, 10 miles (16 km) north-west, a minute or two before the incident.

Responding to The New York Times report, a Security Service of Ukraine (SBU) spokesman reiterated that the evidence they have pointed to a Russian war crime, saying "The enemy hit this civilian object from the S-300 complex". The SBU claimed to have found S-300 missile fragments on the scene of the tragedy. Ukrainian authorities are conducting an official investigation of the incident.

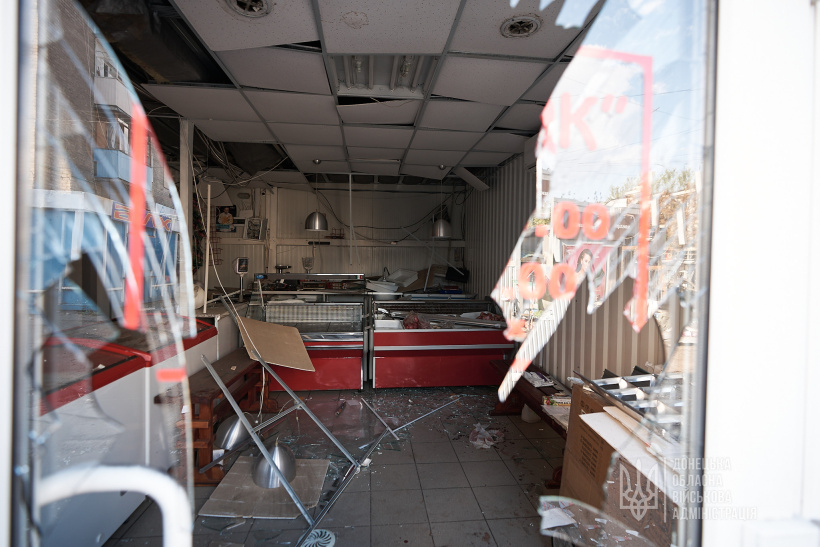

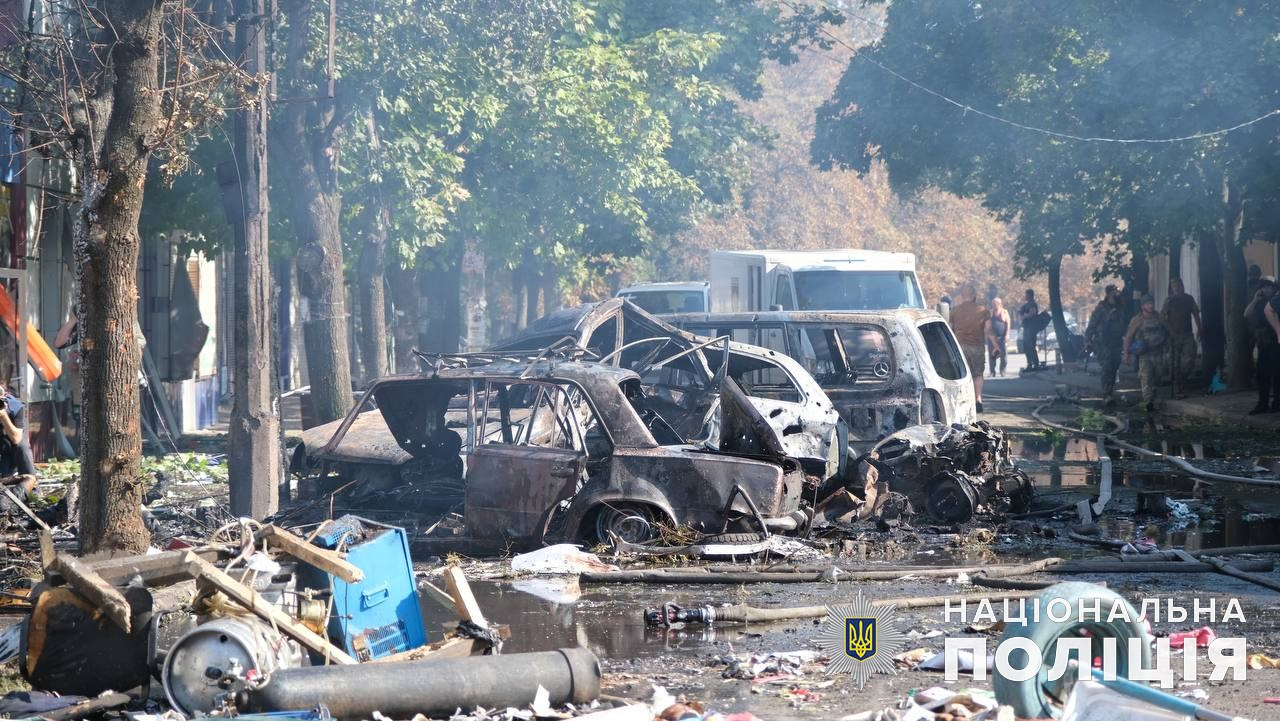

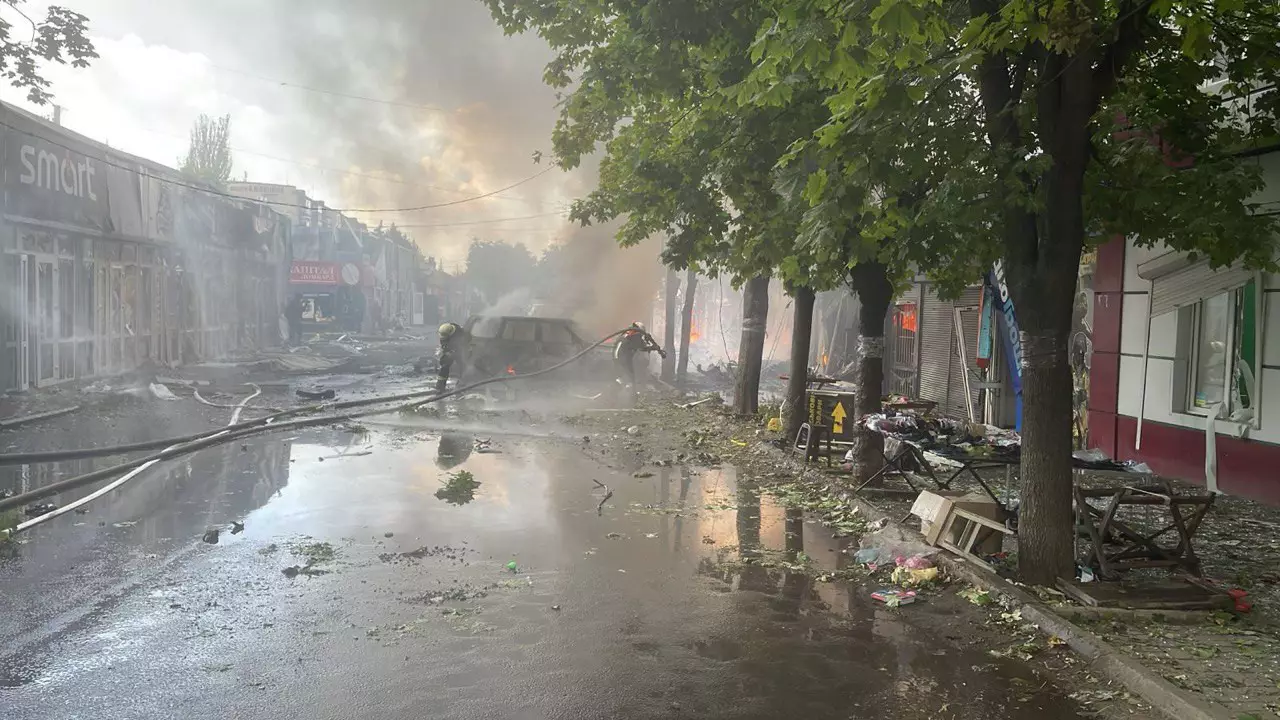

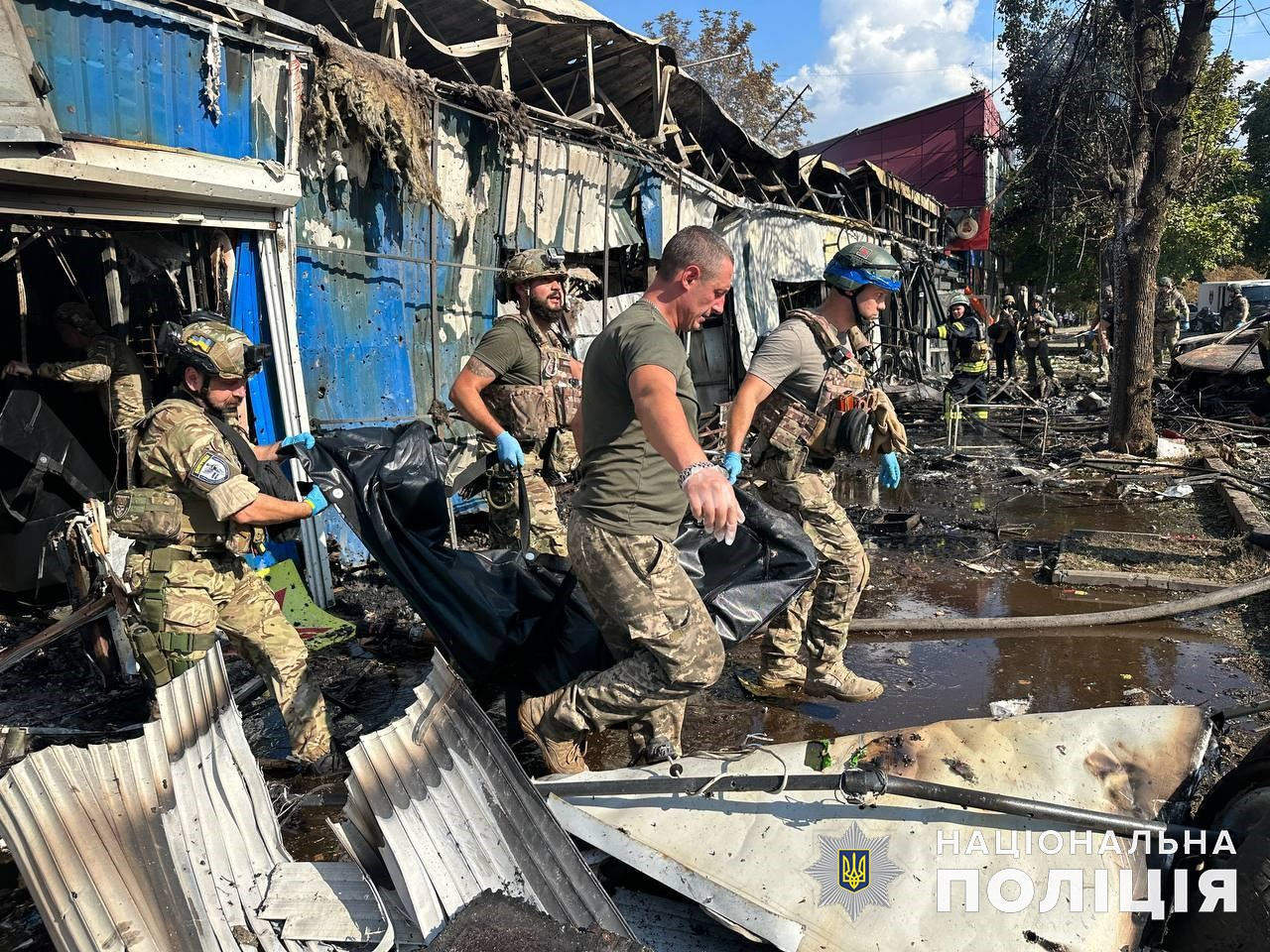

== Investigation ==
The Donetsk Regional Prosecutor’s Office has launched a pre-trial investigation into alleged breaches of the laws and customs of war.

It is symbolic that Russia carried out a terrorist attack on the 80th anniversary of the liberation of Kostiantynivka from the Nazi invaders.

Based on the findings of its own investigation, *The New York Times* claims that the strike on the market in Kostiantynivka, in the Donetsk region, on 6 September — which claimed the lives of 17 people — was a ‘tragic accident’ caused by a Ukrainian missile falling, rather than Russian shelling. The article cites satellite images that do not exist. The author of the NYT article, Thomas Gibbons-Neff, has repeatedly been observed promoting Russian narratives and systematically produces anti-Ukrainian material for The New York Times. He has already had his press pass revoked twice by the Ukrainian Armed Forces for breaching the rules governing work in combat zones. The article, which casts doubt on Russia’s involvement in the strike on Kostiantynivka, requires further legal assessment by the investigating authorities, as confirmed by the Security Service of Ukraine (SBU) — the SBU is conducting an investigation under Article 438 of the Criminal Code of Ukraine (violation of the laws and customs of war) and emphasises that, according to preliminary information, Russian military forces attacked the market in Kostiantynivka with an S-300 missile modified for striking ground targets. This is evidenced, in particular, by the identified missile debris recovered at the scene of the tragedy.

== See also ==
- 26 August 2024 Russian strikes on Ukraine
- 2023 Kramatorsk restaurant missile strike
- 2022 missile explosion in Poland
- Attacks on civilians in the Russian invasion of Ukraine
- Timeline of the Russian invasion of Ukraine (1 September 2023 – present)
