= Denise Brown (UN official) =

Canadian Senior UN official

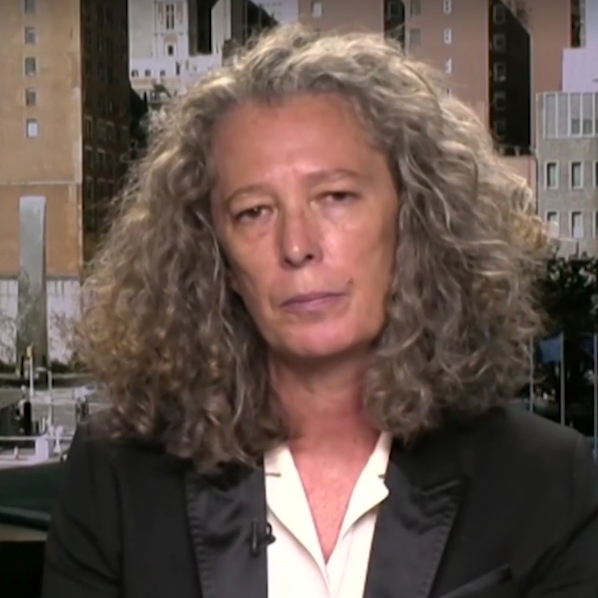
- in 2022
- Born: 1963 (age 62–63)
- Education: University of British Columbia, Purdue University
- Occupation: humanitarian administrator
- Employer: UN

Denise Brown is a Canadian Senior UN official. She was Head of the United Nations in Ukraine and in the Central African Republic. She currently (2025) serves as Head of the United Nations in Sudan.

Prior to this appointment, she served as Deputy Special Representative of the Secretary-General (DSRSG), Humanitarian Coordinator and Resident Coordinator in the Central African Republic.

== Career ==
She began her career in the with non-governmental organizations in Cambodia and Haiti, working in the social sector.

World Food Programme

Brown joined the UN’s World Food Programme in the late 1990s, serving in Iraq (1998-1999), Afghanistan (1999-2002), Kenya (2002-2007), and Somalia (2007-2009), and han Niger, during which she led discussions on humanitarian access with state and non-state actors, including Al Shabab in Somalia.

From 2009 to 2011, she served as a Senior Liaison Officer with WFP in New York, and then, from 2013 to 2016, as WFP's Regional Director for West and Central Africa, based in Dakar, covering 20 countries.

From 2016 to 2019, she worked at World Food Programme (WFP) headquarters in Rome, first as Director of the Emergency Preparedness and then as Director of Policy and Programmes.

UN Peacekeeping

From April 2019 to July 2022, Brown served as Deputy Special Representative for the United Nations Multidimensional Integrated Stabilization Mission in the Central African Republic (MINUSCA), and as United Nations Resident Coordinator and Humanitarian Coordinator, where she reinforced the linkages between the peace and security, development, and humanitarian actions of the UN. In CAR, Brown led the coordination of both the UN’s COVID-19 response and the UN’s integrated electoral assistance for the 2020-21 presidential and legislative elections.

She became the Head of the United Nations in Ukraine in 2022 and she was succeeded in Ukraine by Matthias Schmale in August 2024.

In September 2025 she was appointed as UNs Resident and Humanitarian Coordinator in Sudan.

== Education ==
Brown is a graduate of the University of British Columbia and holds a Master’s of Science in Children’s Development from Purdue University.
