= Donetsk attack =

Donetsk attack may refer to these attacks in Donetsk during the Russo-Ukrainian War:

- Donetsk bus station attack (2015)
- 2022 Donetsk attack (disambiguation)
- 2024 Donetsk attack
