= 2022 Donetsk attack =

2022 Donetsk attack may refer to these attacks in Donetsk during the Russian invasion of Ukraine:

- March 2022 Donetsk attack
- Maisky Market attack
- September 2022 Donetsk attack
