= 2025 Sumy airstrike =

Missile strike during the Russian invasion of Ukraine

- Part of Attacks on civilians in the Russian invasion of Ukraine
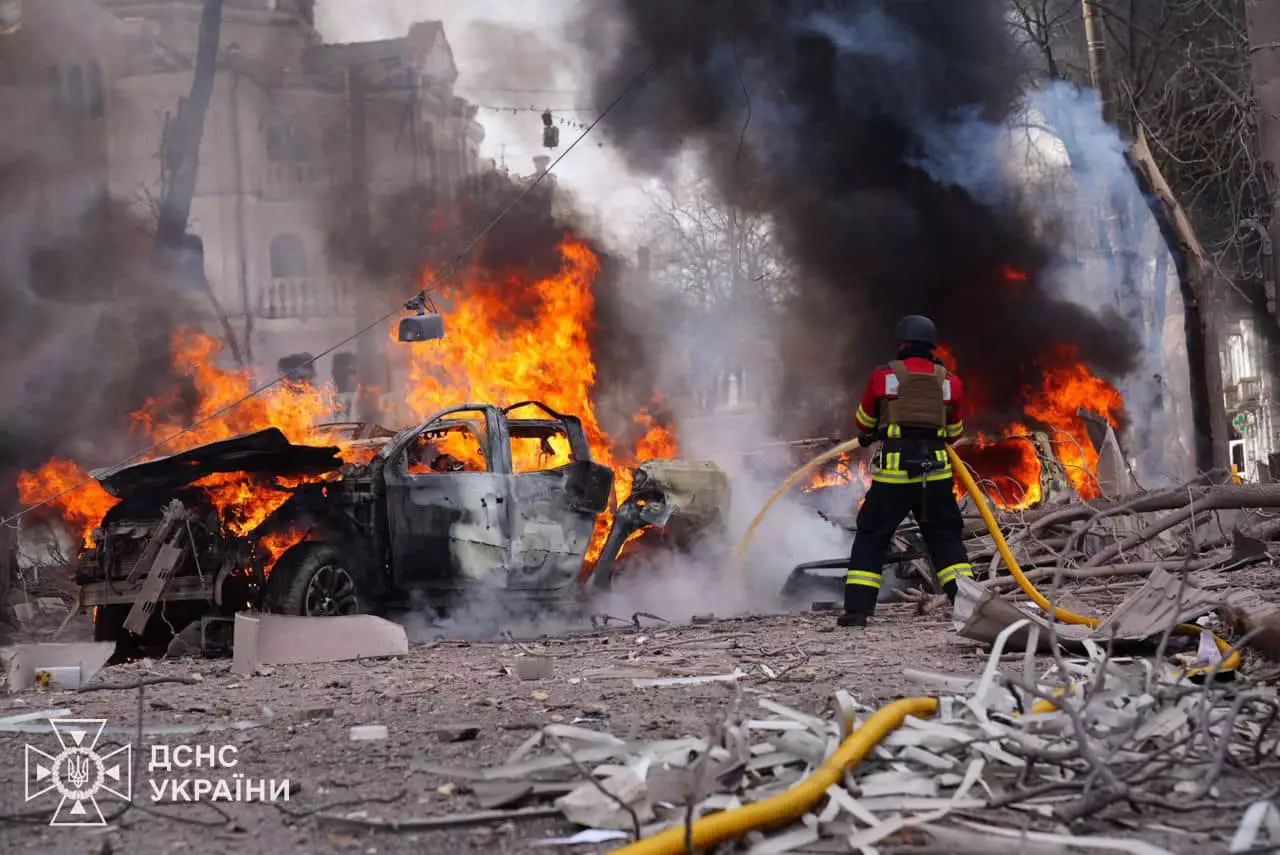
- A firefighter putting out vehicle fires in Sumy city center, following Russian airstrikes
- Location: Sumy, Ukraine
- Date: 13 April 2025; 10:20 a.m. (UTC+3)
- Attack type: Airstrike
- Weapon: Two Iskander-M missiles
- Deaths: 35
- Injuries: 129
- Perpetrator: Russia

On 13 April 2025, Russia launched a missile strike in Sumy in northeastern Ukraine that killed at least 35 people, including two children. It was the deadliest attack on Ukrainian civilians since 2023. The strike, which occurred as residents gathered for Palm Sunday church services, also wounded 129 people, with 15 of the injured being children. Ukrainian officials reported that Russian forces used ballistic missiles with cluster munitions. BBC News Russian affirmed the use of high-explosive incendiary (HEI) munitions instead.

The attack reportedly targeted a planned military award ceremony for Ukraine's 117th Territorial Defense Brigade. Sumy Oblast Military Administration Governor, Volodymyr Artyukh, was dismissed from his post for allegedly planning the ceremony and putting civilians and soldiers at risk.

== Background ==
The attack follows a pattern of intensified Russian aerial operations in Sumy Oblast, which borders Russian territory. In recent weeks, Russian forces had increased missile strikes and aerial attacks in the region while simultaneously pushing Ukrainian military units from positions in the adjacent Kursk Oblast of Russia. Some minor settlements within Sumy Oblast had reportedly fallen under Russian occupation prior to this attack.

The Sumy strike occurred just days after another missile attack killed 20 civilians in Kryvyi Rih, a city in central Ukraine.

== Airstrike ==
The assault targeted Sumy's city center during Palm Sunday church attendance, one of the year's most significant religious observances. According to the head of the regional military administration Volodymyr Artyukh, two ballistic missiles struck densely populated areas. One of the missiles was recorded striking at 10:20 a.m. EEST. Kyrylo Budanov, the Head of the Main Directorate of Intelligence, reported that the attack was carried out by Russian units of the 112th and 448th Rocket Brigades, who struck with two Iskander-M / Hwasong-11A (KN-23) ballistic missiles from the settlements of Liski in Voronezh Oblast and Lezhenki in Kursk Oblast.

Former Ukrainian MPs Ihor Mosiychuk and Maryana Bezuglaya stated that a Ukrainian military formation for an awards ceremony could have taken place in Sumy during the attack, though Reuters was not able to independently confirm this. Mosiychuk stated that the event concerned servicemen of the 117th Territorial Defense Brigade and that civilians, including children, were also present. Mayor of Konotop Artem Semenikhin also stated on Facebook an award ceremony was to take place near the attack site. The Kyiv Independent could not independently verify these claims, while according to Ukrainska Pravda its sources confirmed the ceremony was scheduled to take place. On 14 April, Artyukh said he had been invited to the ceremony but said he did not organize it. Subsequently, the government dismissed Artyukh from office for making comments that appeared to confirm a military award ceremony was taking place.

The Washington Post published on 16 April an article that contained an interview with a soldier of the 117th Brigade, claiming that on the day of the attack he, along with other soldiers, were gathered for the award ceremony in the basement of the university building.

One of the attacks struck close to the Congress Center of Sumy State University, where the regional office of the Verkhovna Rada Commissioner for Human Rights, the Human Rights Protection Center, is located. Kremlin spokesman Dmitry Peskov stated that military servicemen were gathered at the Congress Center for an awards ceremony and that they formed a military target.

Ukrainian authorities indicated that cluster munitions appeared to have been utilized in the attack. These weapons release multiple explosive submunitions across wide areas, presenting particular dangers to civilian populations when deployed near residential zones.

BBC News Russian reported, citing dashcam footage, that the second rocket's strike occurred at ground level or low altitude, which is atypical for a cluster munition detonation. The report further noted that during cluster munition strikes, some submunitions often fail to detonate, remaining scattered at the site. It argued that if such items had been found on the ground, images would likely have been shared on Ukrainian social media platforms.

== Casualties ==
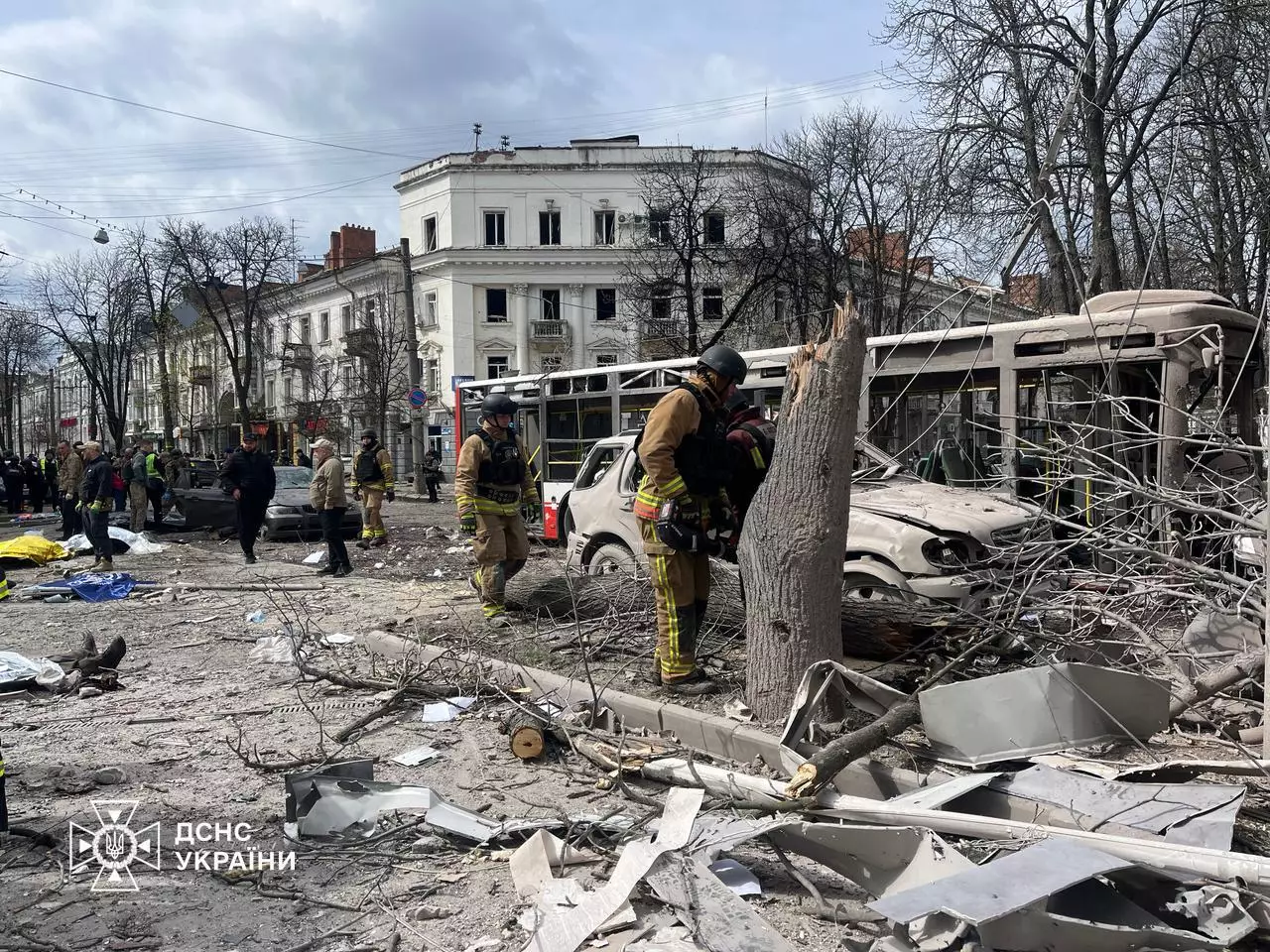
Aftermath of Sumy airstrikes, with fatalities present

At least 35 people were killed in the attack, and 129 were injured, including 15 children. Among the victims was Olena Kohut, an organist of the Sumy Regional Philharmonic Orchestra.

According to the Berdychiv rada and local media, Colonel Yuri Yula, commander of the 27th Rocket Artillery Brigade and former vice-commander of the 26th Rocket Artillery Brigade, was killed in the strike.

The strike destroyed multiple buildings and vehicles, with significant damage to residential structures. Among the most severe losses was a trolleybus hit during the attack, with regional administration head Artyukh confirming that most passengers aboard died.

The Guardian characterized the strikes on Sumy as the worst civilian attack in Ukraine since the start of 2025. CNN reported the strike as the worst civilian attack in Ukraine since the Hroza missile attack in October 2023, which killed 59 people.

== Reactions ==
=== Ukraine ===
Ukrainian President Volodymyr Zelenskyy strongly condemned the attack, characterizing it as deliberate terrorism and calling for stronger international pressure on Russia. In his statement, Zelenskyy emphasized that "talking has never stopped ballistic missiles and bombs" and urged the global community to respond forcefully. Zelenskyy urged allies to send 10 more Patriot air defense systems to protect Ukraine.

Foreign Minister Andrii Sybiha described the targeting of civilians during a religious holiday as "absolute evil" and appealed to international partners for enhanced air defense capabilities. Finance Minister Yulia Svyrydenko highlighted the timing of the attack on one of the year's busiest church attendance days. Andriy Yermak, head of the Ukrainian presidential office, characterized the possible use of cluster armaments as deliberately calculated to inflict maximum civilian casualties.

The mayor of Konotop and a member of Svoboda, Artem Semenikhin announced a day of mourning in tribute to the victims of "Muscovite aggression." He accused the head of the regional military administration Volodymyr Artyukh and head of the Sumy Security Service of Ukraine Oleg Krasnoshapka of setting up the military ceremony in the center of Sumy regardless of civilian presence, nearby ongoing Sumy border military operations, and prior warnings that the ceremony should not be conducted. He demanded their immediate resignation and an apology "to the people" by 6 p.m. on the day of the disaster, threatening to tell more details regarding the attack otherwise. He characterized both as "accomplices" to Russian war crimes and urged the Office of the President of Ukraine to “hide Artyukh behind bars.”

=== Russia ===
Russian foreign minister Sergei Lavrov stated that a facility was hit with "military commanders" and their "Western colleagues" close by. The Russian defence ministry claimed, without evidence, to have killed over 60 troops.

In Russian state media, TV presenter Vladimir Solovyov said the strike, two days after Steve Witkoff's visit to Saint Petersburg, was a "staged provocation" intended by "the Ukrainian authorities" to undermine ceasefire talks between the United States and Russia. Head of RT and Rossiya Segodnya Margarita Simonyan posted on X (Twitter), calling the attack a "manufactured atrocity big enough to impress Trump" staged and amplified by "Ukraine's paymasters," mentioning French president Emmanuel Macron and US special envoy to Ukraine Keith Kellogg.

=== International ===
The missile strike prompted harsh condemnation from multiple international figures. Kaja Kallas, chief diplomat and foreign policy chief of the European Union, described the attack as a "horrific example of Russia intensifying attacks while Ukraine has accepted an unconditional ceasefire." President of the European Commission Ursula von der Leyen stated that "Russian cruelty struck again" in a post on X and characterized the attack as "barbaric" and a "grim reminder" of Russia being the sole aggressor in the war. She emphasized that Europe stood with Ukraine and with Ukrainian President Zelenskyy.

French President Emmanuel Macron urged "strong measures" to enforce a ceasefire. Macron said: "Everyone knows it is Russia alone that wants this war." British Prime Minister Keir Starmer condemned "Russia’s horrific attacks on civilians" and said Russian President Vladimir Putin must agree "to a full and immediate ceasefire without conditions." Matthias Schmale, the United Nations Humanitarian Coordinator for Ukraine, issued a statement condemning the strike "in the strongest possible terms" and emphasized that international humanitarian law expressly prohibits strikes against "civilians and civilian infrastructure." Germany's chancellor-in-waiting Friedrich Merz condemned the attack and accused Vladimir Putin of committing a "war crime." Merz said that: "Our willingness to discuss with him is interpreted not as a serious offer to make peace, but as weakness."

Polish Prime Minister Donald Tusk called the attacks "Bloody Palm Sunday," while the Polish Ministry of Foreign Affairs issued a statement that "condemned Russia's barbaric missile strike on Sumy."

Finnish president Alexander Stubb called for increased sanctions targeting Russia, describing the nation as having no regard for humanitarian law or international law. Moldovan president Maia Sandu urged Ukrainian allies to provide the nation greater air defense, emphasizing that Russia had "no justification for such evil" and that it must face accountability. Estonian prime minister Kristen Michal stated that the attack proved that Russia's goal was to "erase Ukraine," and demanded further aid for Ukraine along with greater pressure against Russia.

Keith Kellogg, U.S. President Donald Trump's special envoy for Ukraine, condemned the strike and said it crossed "any line of decency." Trump called the attack "a horrible thing," said "I was told they made a big mistake," and additionally blamed Zelenskyy for "letting the war start." US Secretary of State Marco Rubio expressed condolences to the victims of the "horrifying Russian missile attack."

Israel expressed its deepest condolences to Ukraine and "the families who lost their loved ones in the recent Russian attack in Sumy."

UN Secretary-General Antonio Guterres was "deeply alarmed and shocked" by the attack. The UN chief's spokesman Stephane Dujarric recalled that "attacks against civilians and civilian objects are prohibited under international humanitarian law."

== See also ==
- Attacks on civilians in the Russian invasion of Ukraine
- March 2022 Donetsk attack
- 3 March 2022 Chernihiv bombing
- Kramatorsk railway station attack
- Lyman cluster bombing
- April 2023 Sloviansk airstrike
- 2024 Donetsk attack
- 8 July 2024 Russian strikes on Ukraine
- 22 March 2024 Russian strikes on Ukraine
