= 2024 Donetsk attack =

Shelling in Donetsk, Ukraine

- Part of the Russian invasion of Ukraine
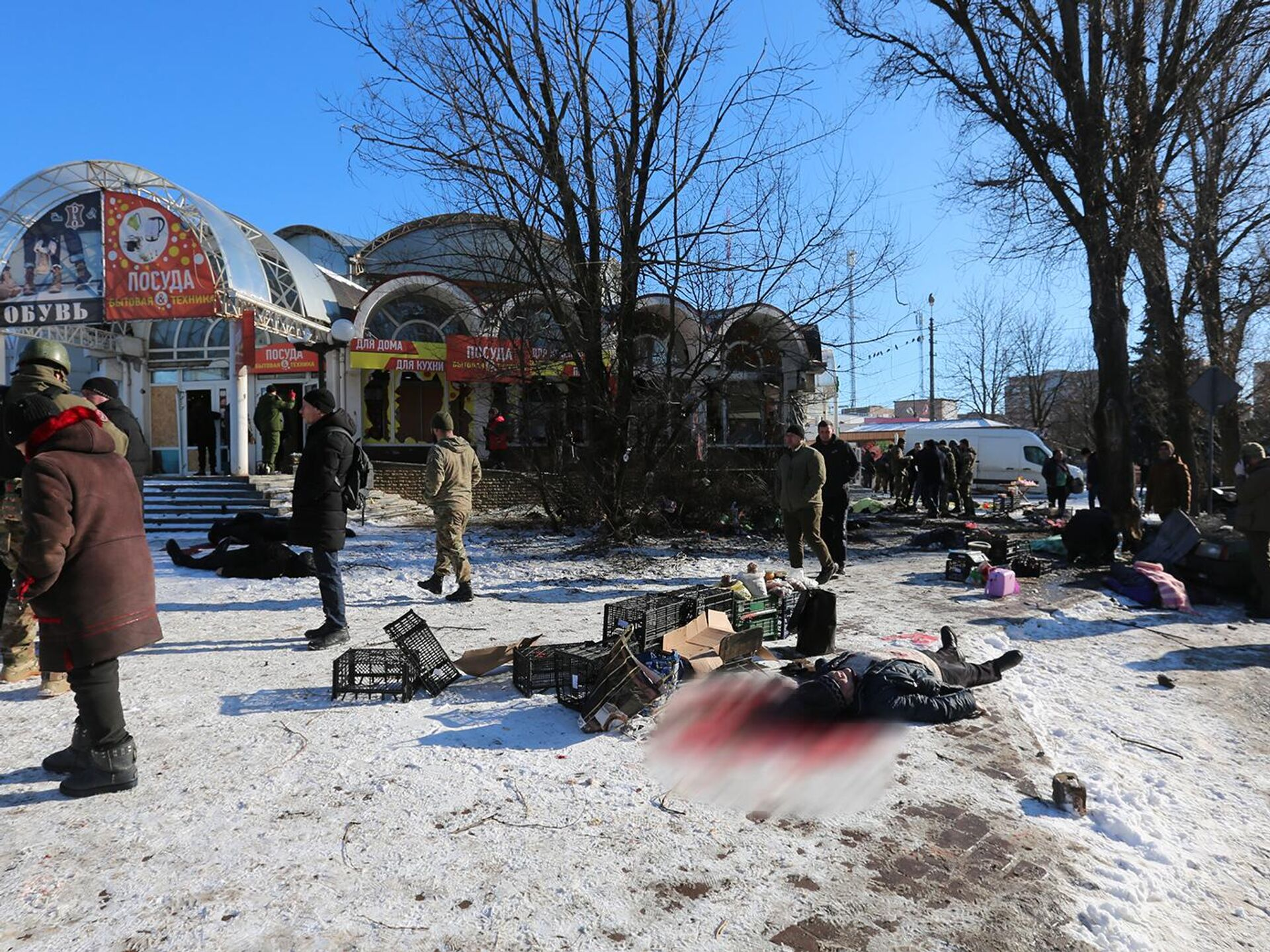
- Consequences of the shelling
- Location: Donetsk
- Date: 21 January 2024; 10:20 (UTC+3)
- Target: Civilians in Donetsk
- Attack type: Missile
- Weapon: Multiple rocket launcher
- Deaths: 28
- Injuries: 25
- Perpetrators: Ukraine (alleged, denied by Ukraine)

The shelling of Russian-controlled Donetsk was an attack that occurred on 21 January 2024, during Russia's invasion of Ukraine. Artillery shells hit a market in the Donetsk, killing at least 28 people. Russia accuses Ukraine of launching the strike; Ukraine denies the attack. According to media reports, the shelling was the bloodiest for Donetsk since 2014.

== The course of events ==
On the morning of January 21, the DPR authorities reported massive shelling of Donetsk. The head of the Russian administration of the city, Alexey Kulemzin, urged residents of Kirovskyi District, where the affected Mercury market is located, not to leave shelters at about 10:20 Moscow time.

Less than 15 minutes later, Kulemzin reported that there were casualties as a result of the shelling of Kirovskyi District. According to Radio Liberty, the Tekstilshchik microdistrict, where the Mercury city market is located, was affected.

According to the mayor of the Russian authorities, Alexei Kulemzin, 28 people were killed and 25 others were injured. The head of the DPR Denis Pushilin noted that the market was hit at a time when there were many people there. According to him, the strike was carried out by the Ukrainian side from barrel artillery from the Kurakhovsky and Krasnogorovsky directions.

== Reaction ==
=== Russia ===
According to the head of the DPR Denis Pushilin, the blow was struck by the Ukrainian side from barrel artillery from the Kurakhovsky and Krasnogorovsky directions. The Russian Ministry of Foreign Affairs condemned the strike as a terrorist attack directed against civilians. The ministry called the strike a "barbaric terrorist act against the civilian population of Russia".

=== Ukraine ===
At first, the Ukrainian side did not comment on the incident in any way, and then representatives of the Ukrainian group of troops "Tavria" declared their non-involvement in this shelling.

=== The UN ===
UN Secretary-General Antonio Guterres said he "strongly condemns all attacks against civilians and civilian infrastructure, including today’s shelling of the city of Donetsk in Ukraine".

== See also ==
- March 2022 Donetsk attack
- Maisky Market attack
- September 2022 Donetsk attack
