= Kirovskyi District =

Kirovskyi District may refer to any of the following administrative divisions of Ukraine:

- Kirovskyi District, an urban district of Donetsk.
