= Kirov Raion =

Kirov Raion may refer to:

== Azerbaijan ==
- Binagadi raion, named Kirov raion 1920–1992

== Ukraine ==
- Kirovskyi District, Donetsk
- name of Tsentralnyi District, Dnipro before 2015
- name of Pechersk Raion before 1944

== See also ==
- Kirovsky District (disambiguation)
- Kirovske Raion (Kirovsky District), a district of the Autonomous Republic of Crimea, named after Kirovske
