= Kirovsky District =

Kirovsky District may refer to:

- Kirovskyi District, Donetsk
- Kirawsk Raion (Kirovsky District), a district of Mogilev Oblast, Belarus
- Kirovsky District, Russia, several districts and city districts in Russia
- Kirovske Raion (Kirovsky District), a district in Crimea
- Kirovsky City District, Novosibirsk
- Kirov Raion (disambiguation)

== See also ==
- Kirovsky (disambiguation)
