= Volodymyr Artiukh =

Ukrainian public and political figure, soldier

- Володимир Артюх
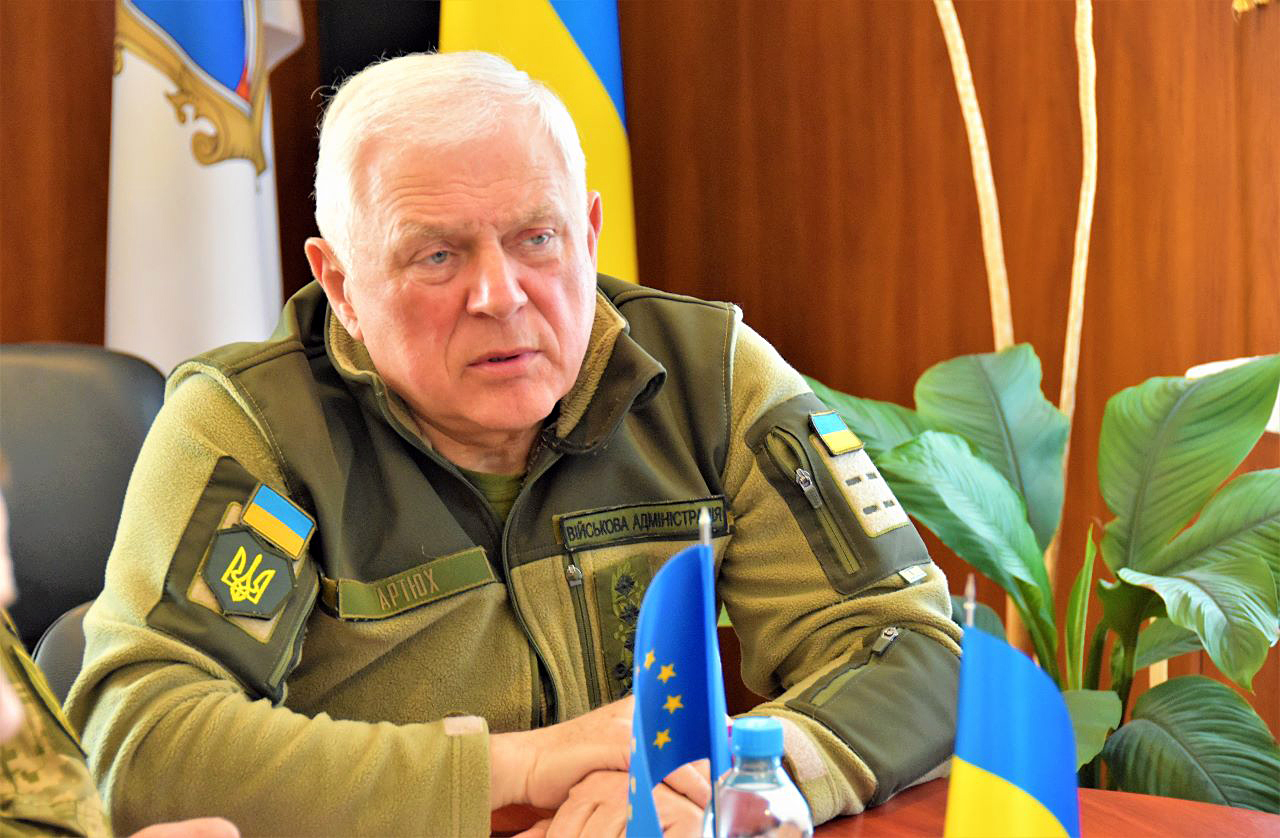
- Artiukh in 2023

18th Governor of Sumy Oblast
- In office 12 April 2023 – 15 April 2025
- President: Volodymyr Zelenskyy
- Prime Minister: Denys Shmyhal
- Preceded by: Taras Savchenko (acting)
- Succeeded by: Oleh Hryhorov

Personal details
- Born: Volodymyr Mykolayovych Artyukh; 8 May 1958 (age 68) Blagoveshchensk, Amur Oblast, Russian SFSR, Soviet Union

Military service
- Allegiance: Ukraine
- Branch/service: Ukrainian Ground Forces
- Rank: Lieutenant general

Volodymyr Mykolaiovych Artiukh (Ukrainian: Володимир Миколайович Артюх; born 8 May 1958) is a Ukrainian military and political leader who served as the head of the Sumy Oblast Military Administration from 2023 to 2025. He gained prominence during the Russo-Ukrainian War, particularly due to his leadership in managing the defense and security of Sumy Oblast, which lies on Ukraine's northeastern border with Russia.

== Biography ==
Artiukh was born on May 8, 1958, in Blagoveshchensk, Amur Oblast which was under the Russian SFSR at that time, later in his life he graduated from the Kharkov Higher Military Aviation Command School of Communications in 1979, the Gagarin Air Force Academy in 1988 and National Defence University of Ukraine in 2005.

In 2009, Artiukh worked as the head of the Podilsk branch of the state enterprise "Ukrainian State Radio Frequency Center", adviser to the head of the Vinnytsia Regional Military Administration, deputy chief of the General Staff of the Ukrainian Armed Forces.

In 2020, Artiukh ran for the Vinnytsia City Council from the "Ukrainian Party of Honor, Fight against Corruption and Organized Crime", but lost.

In July and August 2024, Artiukh ordered the evacuation of Ukrainian territories bordering Russia's Kursk Oblast. This decision was in response to escalating tensions and military activities, including a significant Ukrainian incursion into Kursk Oblast, where Ukrainian forces reportedly captured several settlements. The move marked one of the largest and most notable incursions by Ukrainian forces into Russian territory since the start of the war.

Following the 2025 Sumy airstrike on 13 April, Artiukh was dismissed as governor by President Volodymyr Zelenskyy on 15 April and was replaced by Oleh Hryhorov. Artiukh had been accused of endangering civilians in the attack by organizing a military awards ceremony in Sumy city, which he denied.
