= Oleh Hryhorov =

Ukrainian politician and former police office

- Олег Григоров
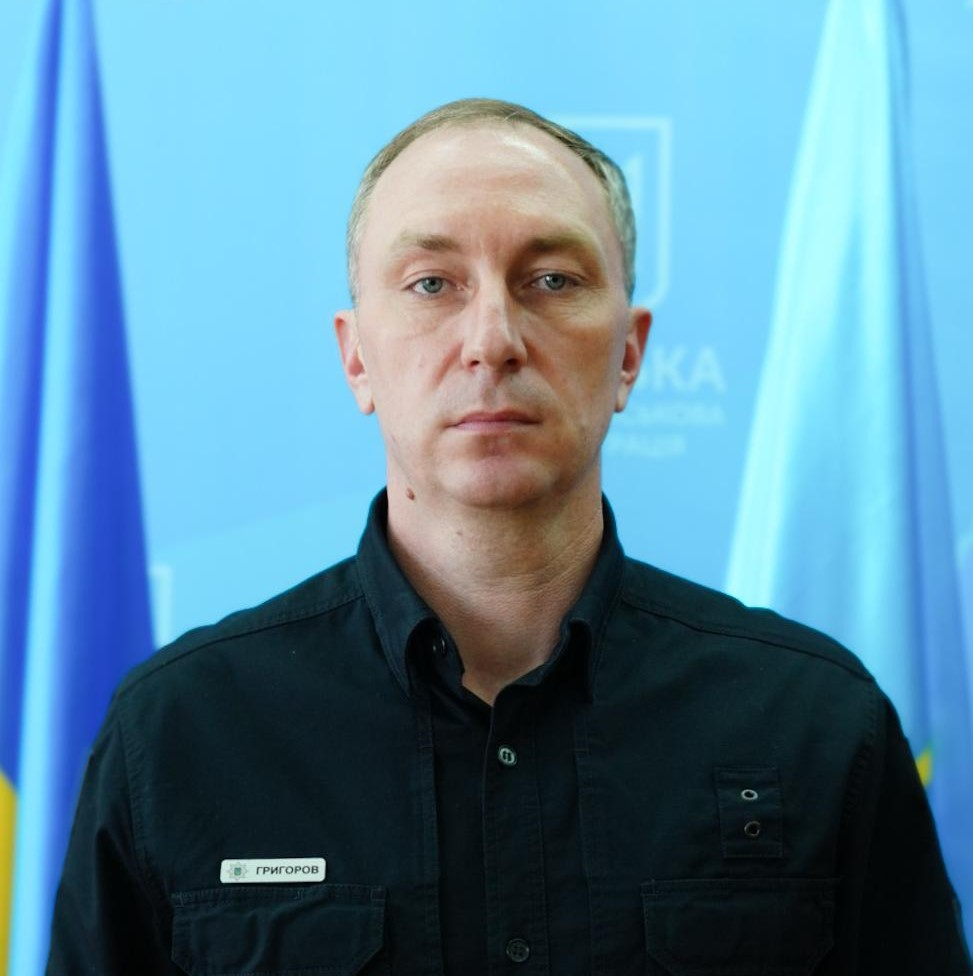
- Hryhorov in 2025

Governor of Sumy Oblast
- Incumbent
- Assumed office 17 April 2025
- President: Volodymyr Zelenskyy
- Preceded by: Volodymyr Artyukh

Personal details
- Born: 7 April 1979 (age 47) Sumy, Sumy Oblast, Ukrainian SSR, Soviet Union

Oleh Oleksiyovych Hryhorov (Ukrainian: Олег Олексійович Григоров; born 7 April 1979) is a Ukrainian politician and former police officer who is currently the Governor of Sumy Oblast since 17 April 2025.

He is a 3rd rank police general as of August 2024.

== Biography ==
Oleh Hryhorov was born in Sumy on 17 April 1979.

He graduated from the University of Internal Affairs in 2000 with a degree in law, a qualification level, as a lawyer.

From 2000 to November 2019 he worked in Sumy Oblast in law enforcement agencies. He went from the investigative department of the Kovpakiv district department of Sumy city department of police department in Sumy to the deputy chief of the Main Directorate of the National Police in Sumy Oblast - Chief of Investigation Department.

From November 2019 to January 2021, he was the Deputy Head of the Main Directorate of the National Police of Ukraine in Zaporizhzhia Oblast - Head of Investigation Department.

From January 2021 to September 2024, he was the Head of the Main Directorate of the National Police of Ukraine in Luhansk Oblast.

From September 2024 to April 2025, he was the Advisor to the Head of the National Police of Ukraine (Kyiv).

On 15 April 2025, the Ukrainian governmenrt agreed to Hyrhorov's candidacy for the post of head of Sumy Regional State Administration. On 17 April, he officially became the governor of Sumy Oblast.
