= September 2022 Donetsk attack =

Shelling in Donetsk, Ukraine

- Part of Russo-Ukrainian war (2022–present)
- Location: Donetsk, Ukraine
- Date: September 19, 2022
- Target: Civilians of Donetsk
- Attack type: Missile Strike, Artillery Barrage
- Injuries: Unknown
- Victims: 13 people
- Perpetrator: Ukraine

The September 2022 Donetsk attack was the shelling of civilian infrastructure facilities on the Baku Commissars Square in Donetsk, as a result of which, according to Russian-backed mayor Alexey Kulemzin, 13 people were killed.

Local authorities stated that nine 150 mm shells were used, targeting Kuibishevsky District of Donetsk from a village west to the city.

== Course of events ==
Since the start of the war in Donbass in 2014, the Ukrainian city of Donetsk has been controlled by the forces of the self-proclaimed Donetsk People's Republic, which claims control over the entire territory of the Donetsk region.

== Victims ==
According to Alexey Kulemzin, 13 people became victims of the shelling, including two children. The number of wounded remains unknown. Both Russian and DPR sources blame Ukraine for the shelling. There were no official comments from the Ukrainian side about the shelling.

== See also ==
- March 2022 Donetsk attack
- Maisky Market attack
