= Maisky Market attack =

Artillery attack in Donetsk, Ukraine

- Part of Russian invasion of Ukraine
- Location: Donetsk, Ukraine
- Date: June 13, 2022
- Attack type: Artillery strike
- Deaths: 5
- Injuries: 22
- Perpetrator: Ukraine

On 13 June 2022, a Ukrainian artillery attack hit a marketplace in the Russian-occupied city of Donetsk, Ukraine, killing five civilians, including a child, and injuring at least 22, according to pro-Russian separatist officials.

The Maiskyi Market in the Budonivskyi district was reportedly hit, starting a fire. The pro-Russian Donetsk News Agency said the munitions used were "155-mm-calibre NATO-standard artillery munitions".

Local separatist authorities said that the attack had followed an alleged campaign of shelling in the city by the Ukrainian Armed Forces, which had also hit a hospital.

== See also ==
- March 2022 Donetsk attack
- September 2022 Donetsk attack
