= March 2022 Donetsk attack =

Missile attack in Ukraine

- Part of the Russian invasion of Ukraine
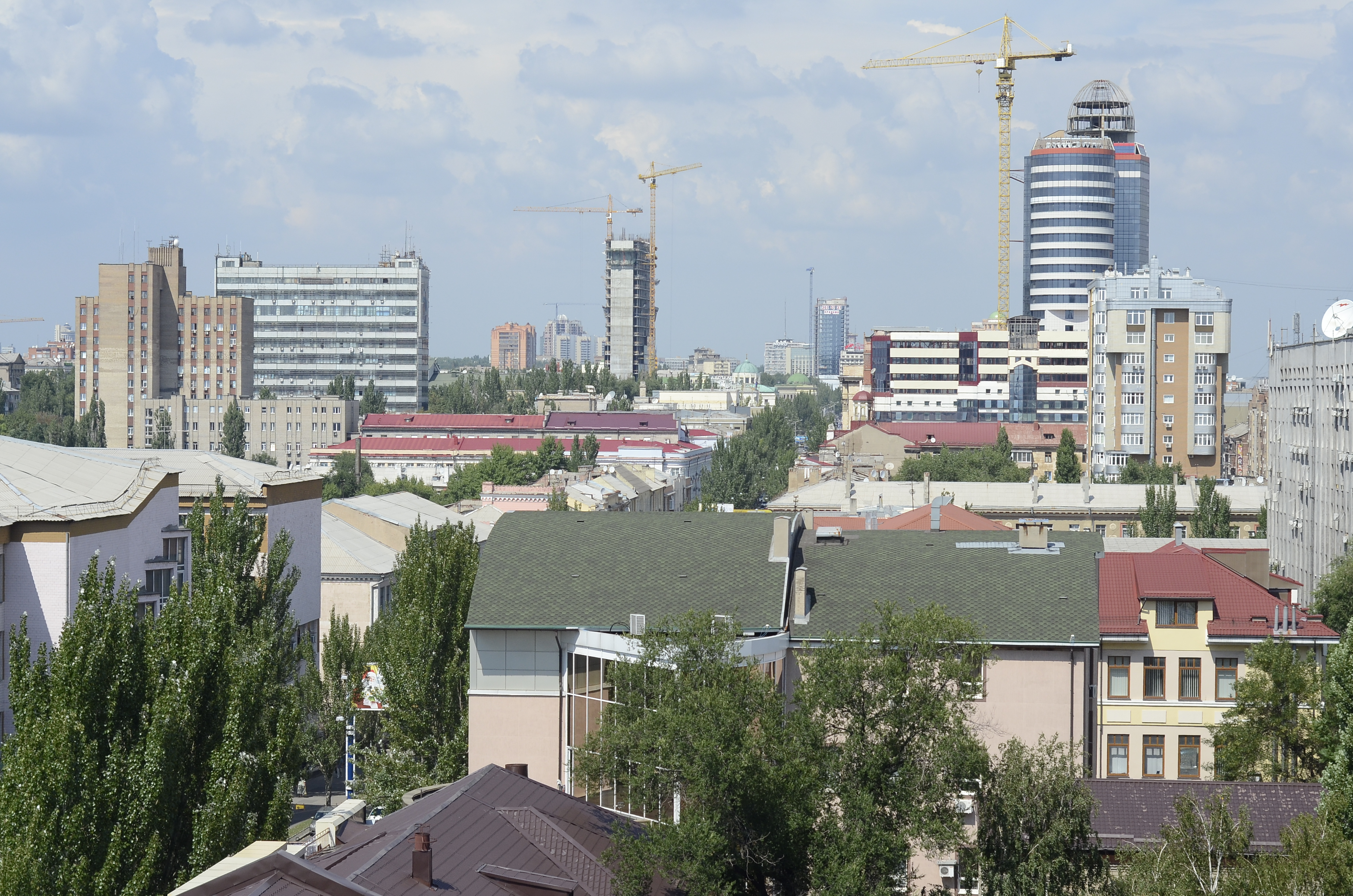
- Skyline of Donetsk city centre, 2011
- Location: Donetsk, Ukraine
- Date: 14 March 2022; 11:31 (UTC+3)
- Target: Civilians in Donetsk
- Attack type: Missile
- Deaths: 23
- Injuries: 36 (per Russia)
- Perpetrator: Unknown

On 14 March 2022, during the Russian invasion of Ukraine, a Tochka-U missile attack hit the center of Donetsk, Ukraine, at the time under Russian occupation and administration of the Donetsk People's Republic (DPR). The Russian Investigative Committee reported that the attack killed 23 civilians, including children, and injured at least 18 people. The Office of the High Commissioner for Human Rights reported that the attacked killed 15 civilians and injured 36 people. Ukraine claimed that the rocket had been fired by the Russians, while Russia and the DPR claimed that the attack was carried out by Ukrainian forces. As of 14 March, neither the Russian nor the Ukrainian claims could be independently verified.

== Conflicting versions ==
According to the Ministry of Defense of the Russian Federation, the missile was launched from the Pokrovsk Raion, controlled by the Ukrainian forces. The Russian Ministry also claimed that "the use of such weapons against a city where there is no armed forces firing position is a war crime." Denis Pushilin, head of the self-proclaimed DPR, said that the missile carried a cluster munition warhead, which led to so many casualties, and claimed that the missile had been shot down by DPR defense systems.

Leonid Matyukhin, a spokesperson for the Ukrainian military, said that the missile, which carried a shrapnel warhead, was a Russian rocket. Matyukhin said that "It is unmistakably a Russian rocket or another munition; there's not even any point talking about it." In an interview on 15 March, Ruslan Leviev, founder of the Conflict Intelligence Team, said photos from the incident suggest the missile originated from Russian-controlled territory and was not shot down by DPR air defense systems.

== Gallery ==
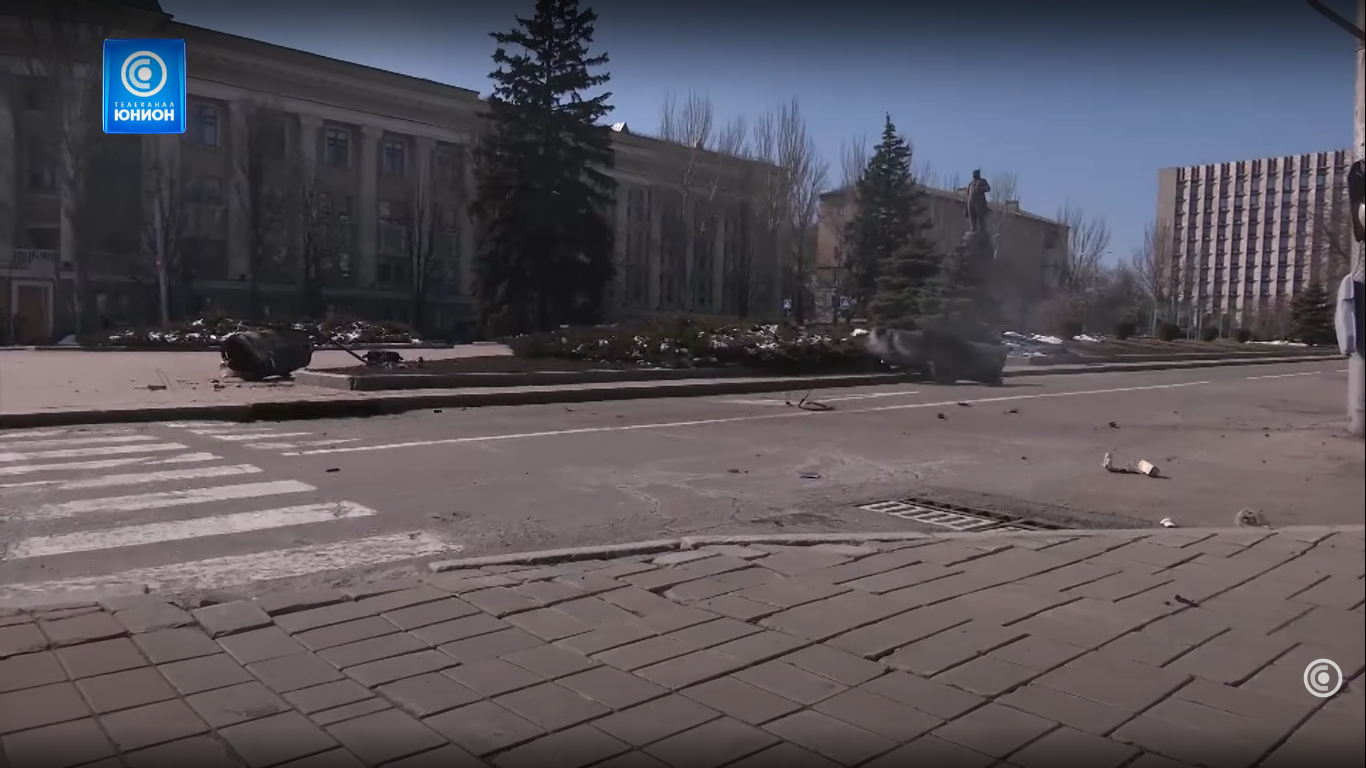

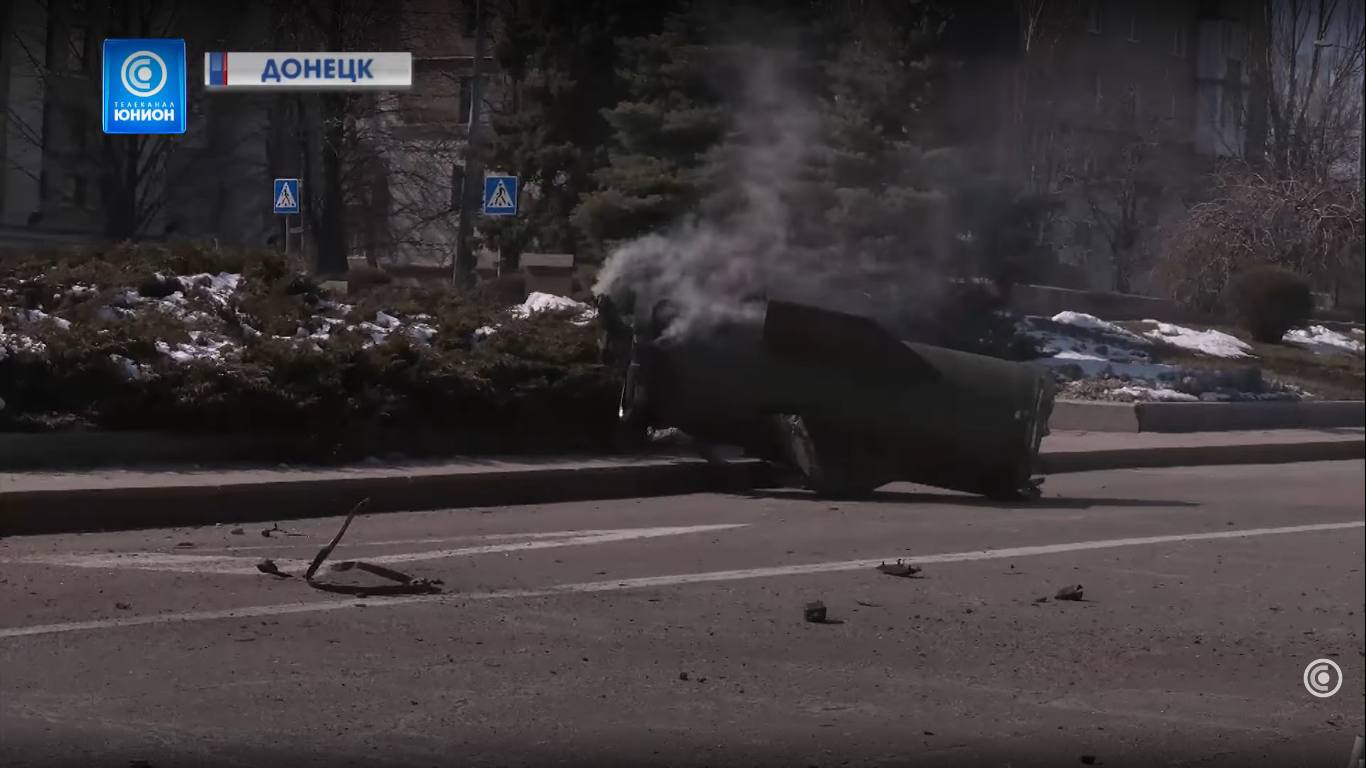

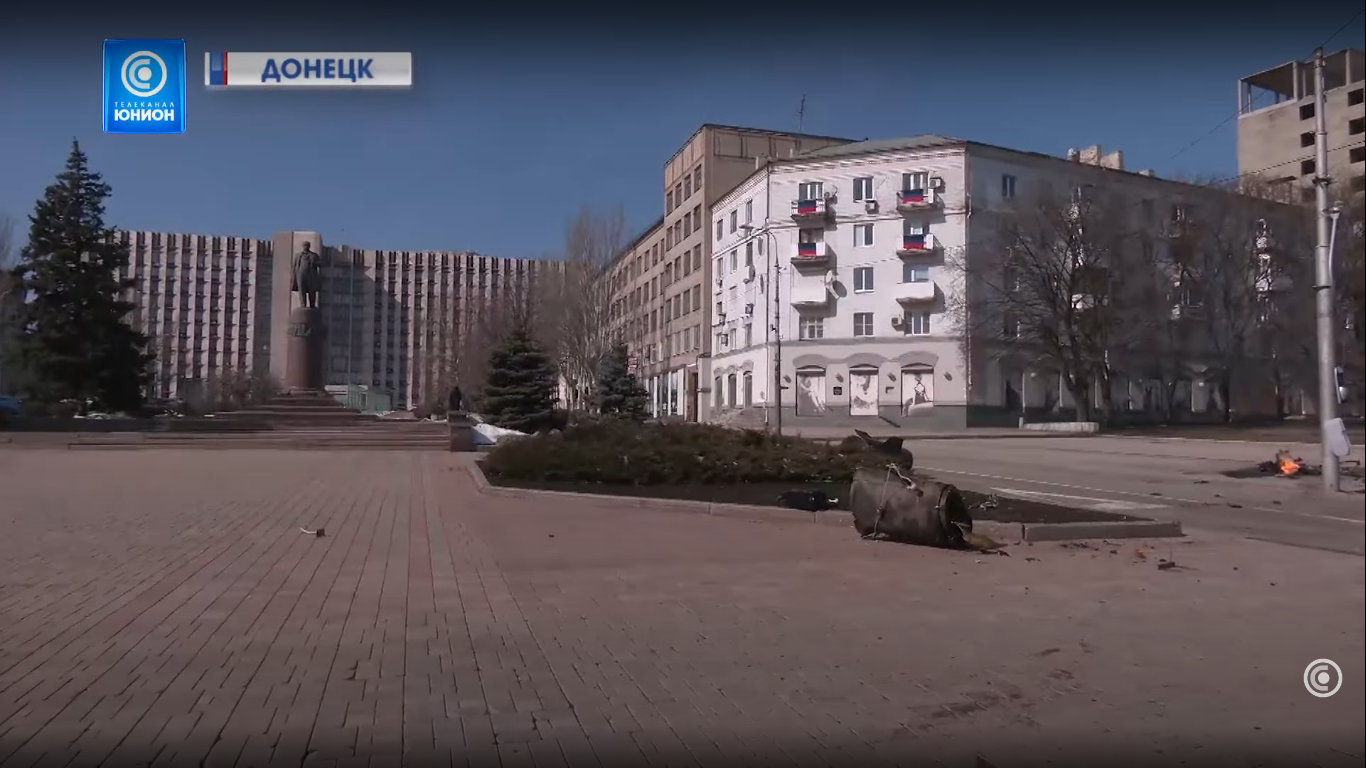

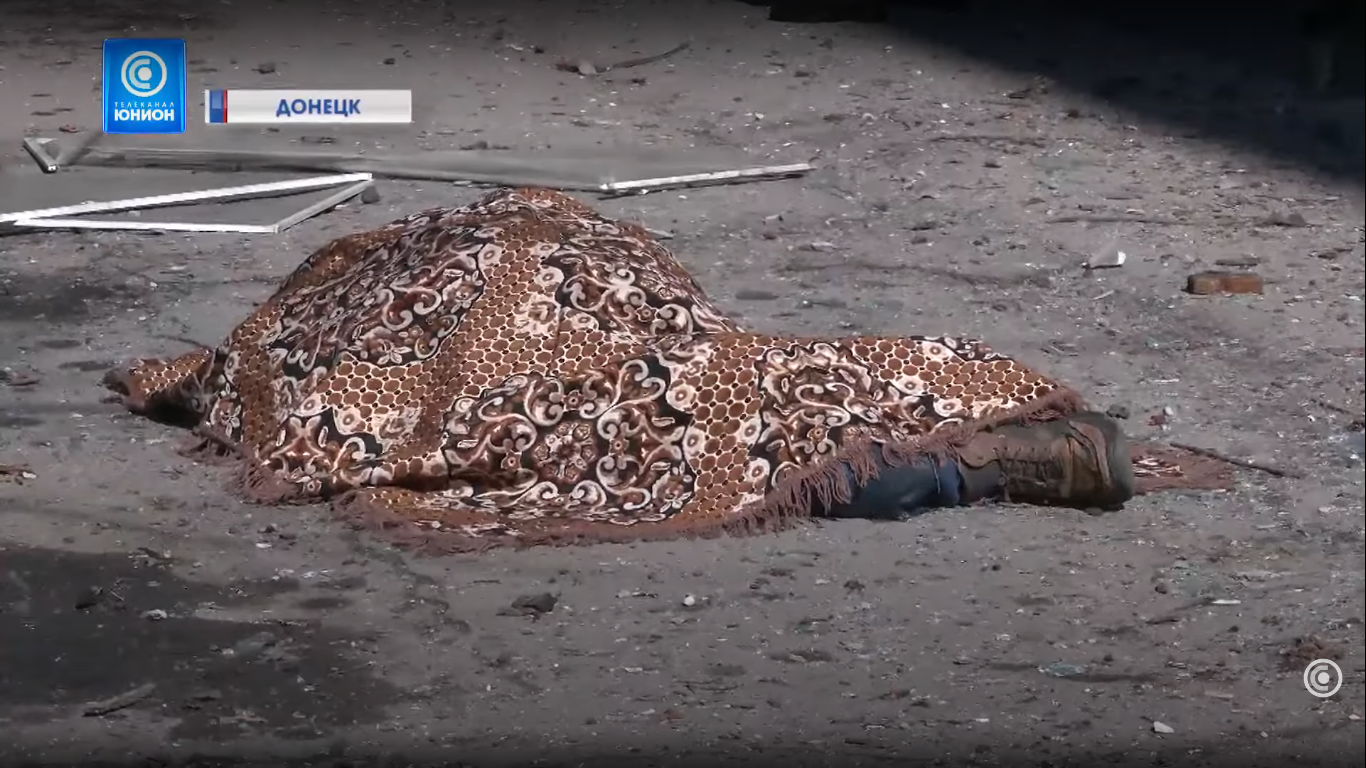

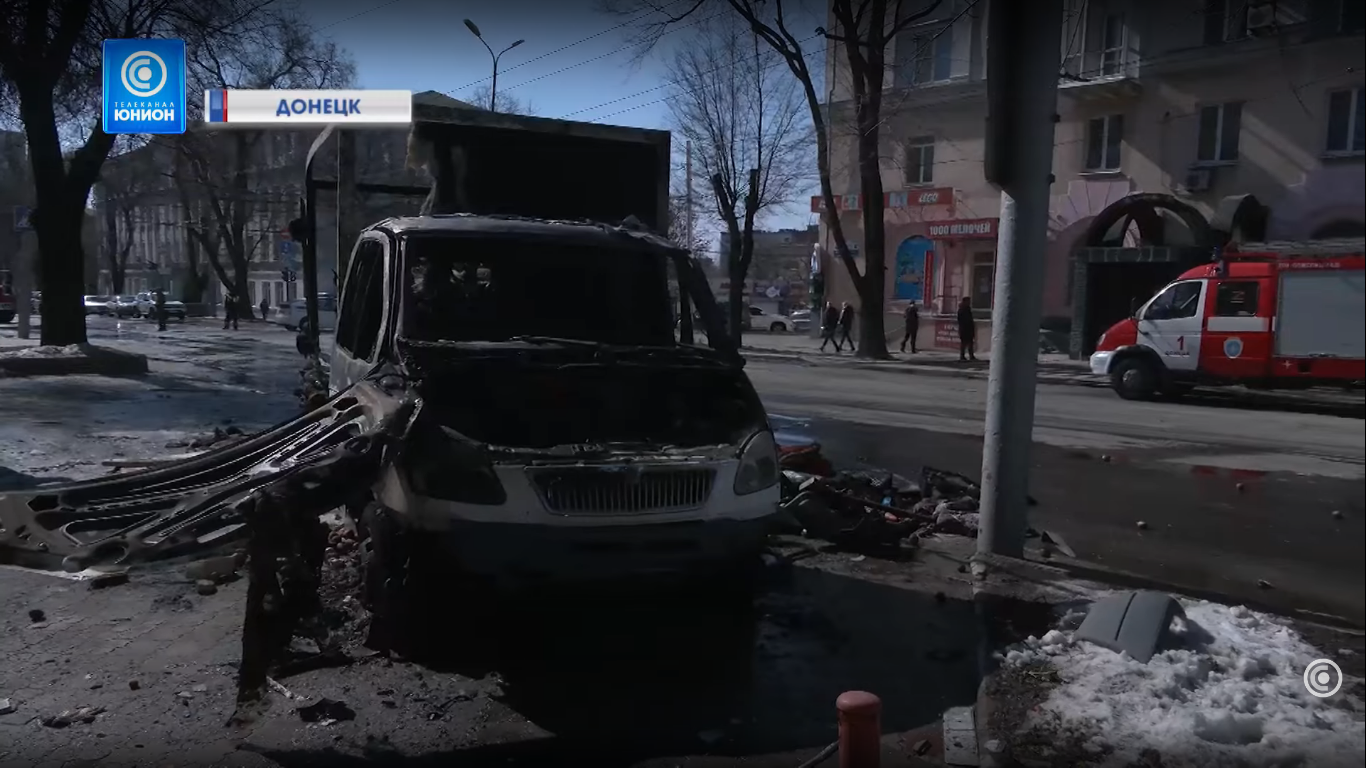

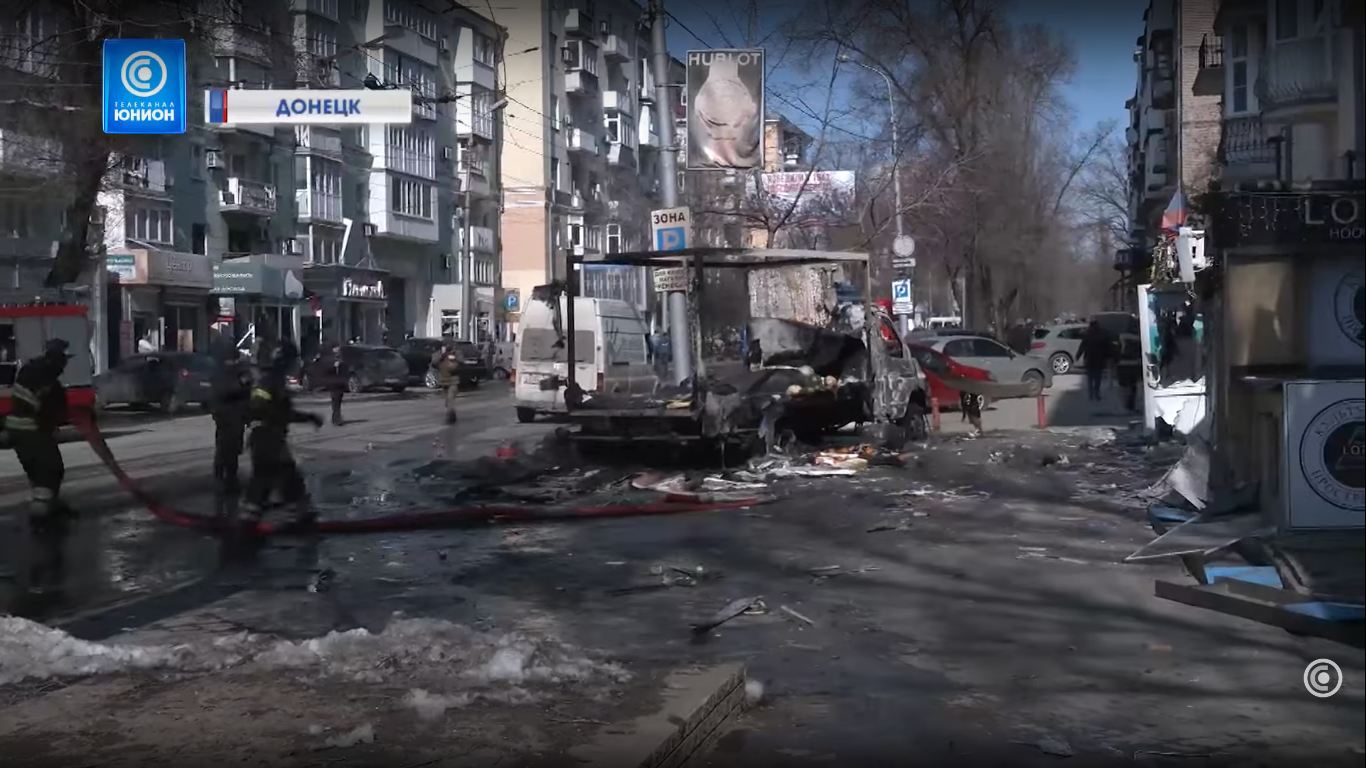

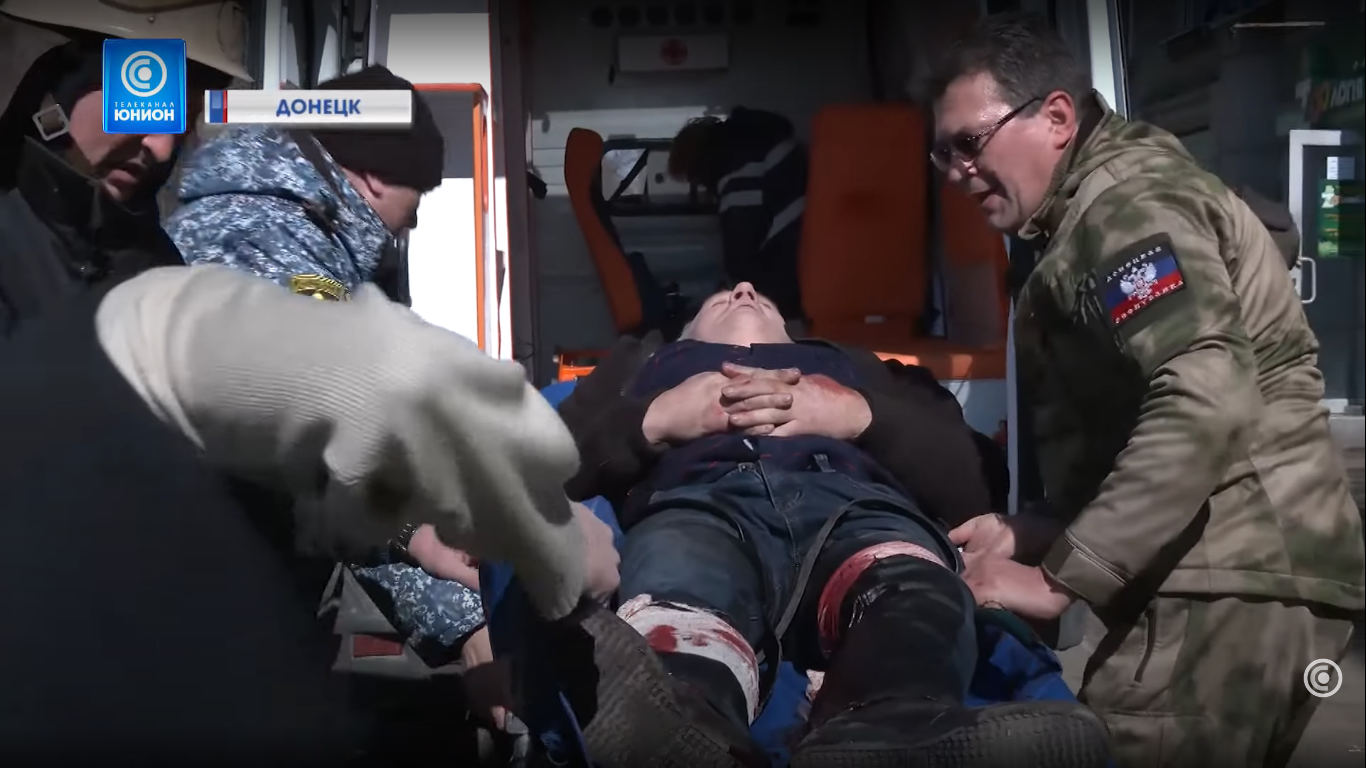

== See also ==
- Maisky Market attack
- September 2022 Donetsk attack
