= Kirovskyi District, Donetsk =

Coordinates: 47.979810°N 37.703406°E

Kirovskyi District Кіровський район
- Urban district
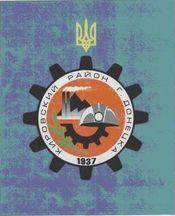
- Coat of arms
- Interactive map of Kirovskyi District
- Country: Ukraine
- Oblast: Donetsk Oblast

Area
  - Total: 67.1 km^{2} (25.9 sq mi)

Population
  - Total: 168,046
- Time zone: UTC+2 (EET)
  - Summer (DST): UTC+3 (EEST)

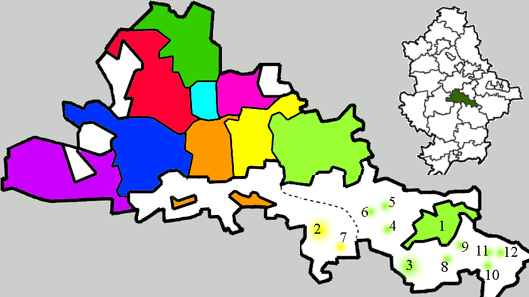
Districts of Donetsk on the territory of the Donetsk City Municipality: Budonivskyi District Voroshylovskyi District Kalininskyi District Kyivskyi District Kirovskyi District / Kuibyshevskyi District Leninskyi District Petrovskyi District Proletarskyi District

Kirovskyi District (Ukrainian: Кіровський район) is an urban district of the city of Donetsk, Ukraine, named after a mayor of the Russian city Saint Petersburg Sergei Kirov.

On 22 February 2026, the Donetsk Oblast Military Administration renamed it to Rutchenkivskyi District (Ukrainian: Рутченківський район) as part of the decommunization and derussification campaign. This name comes from the former settlement of Rutchenkove. However, this name is only de jure used by the Ukrainian government and the renaming has not de facto taken place while Donetsk is under Russian control.

== Places ==
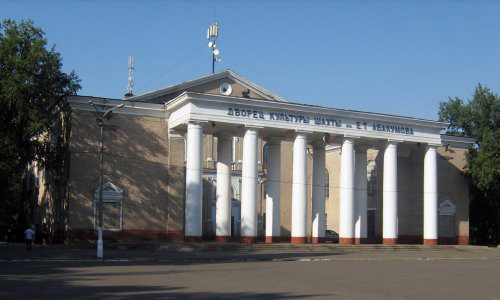
Palace of Culture (Abakumov Mine)

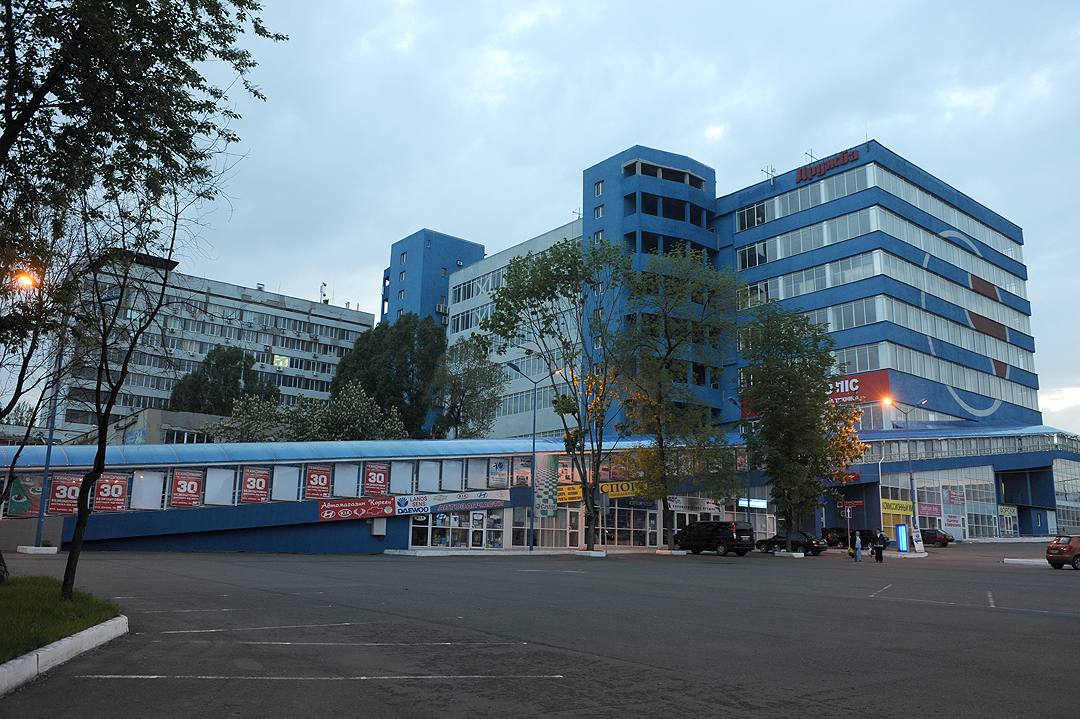
Trade Center "Friendship" (former a toy factory)

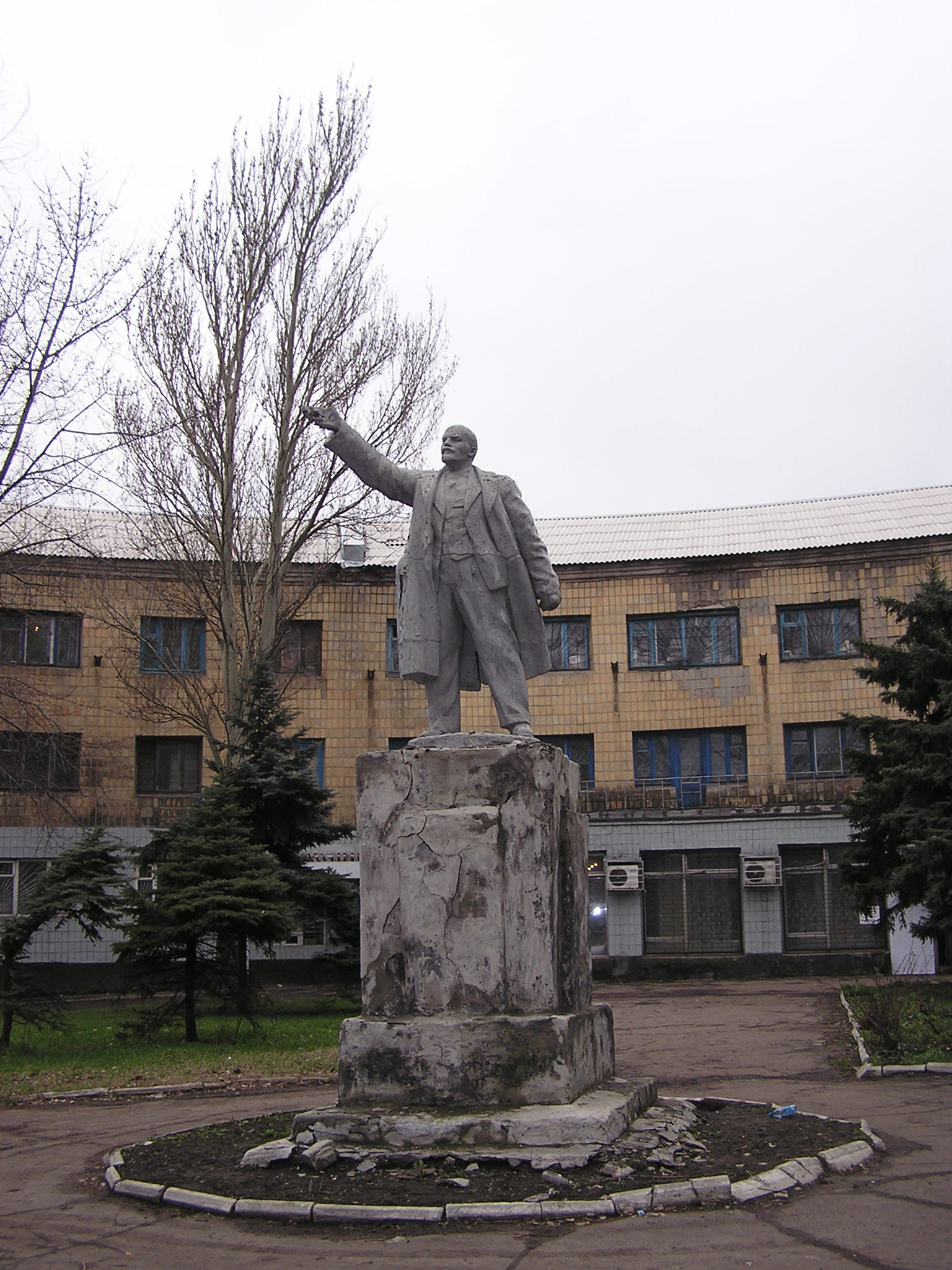
Lenin monument

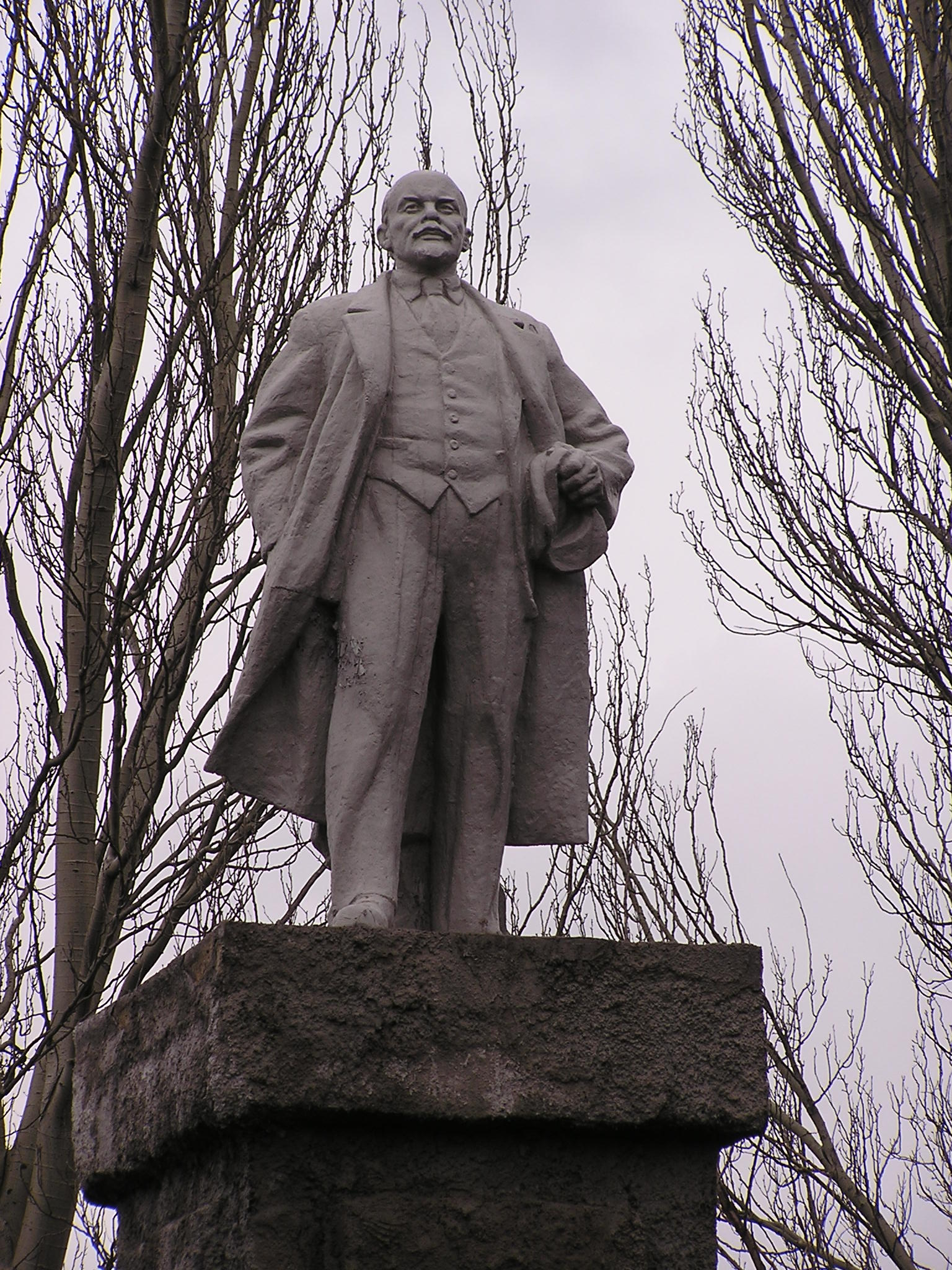
Lenin at Lidievka Mine

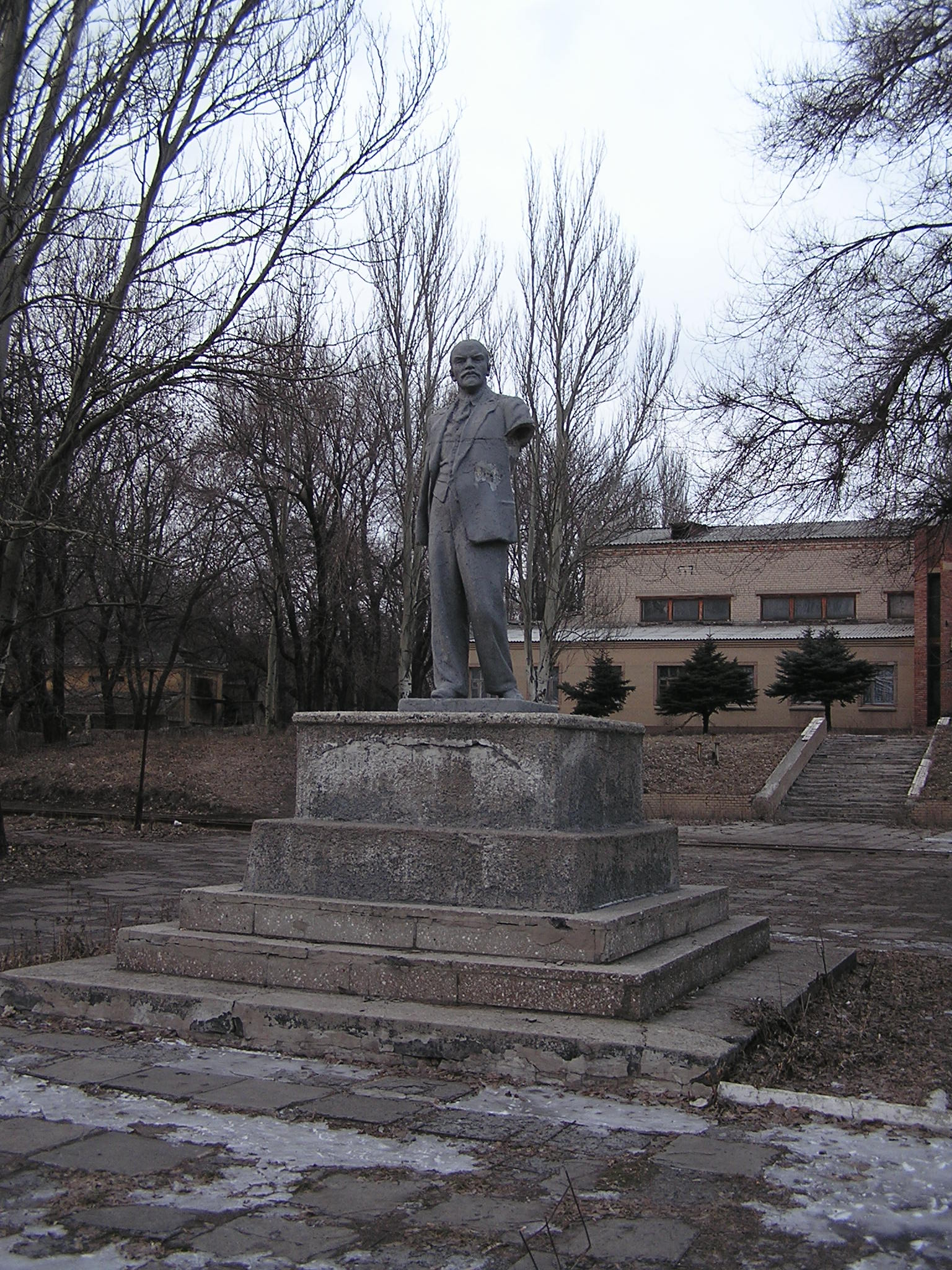
Lenin without hands

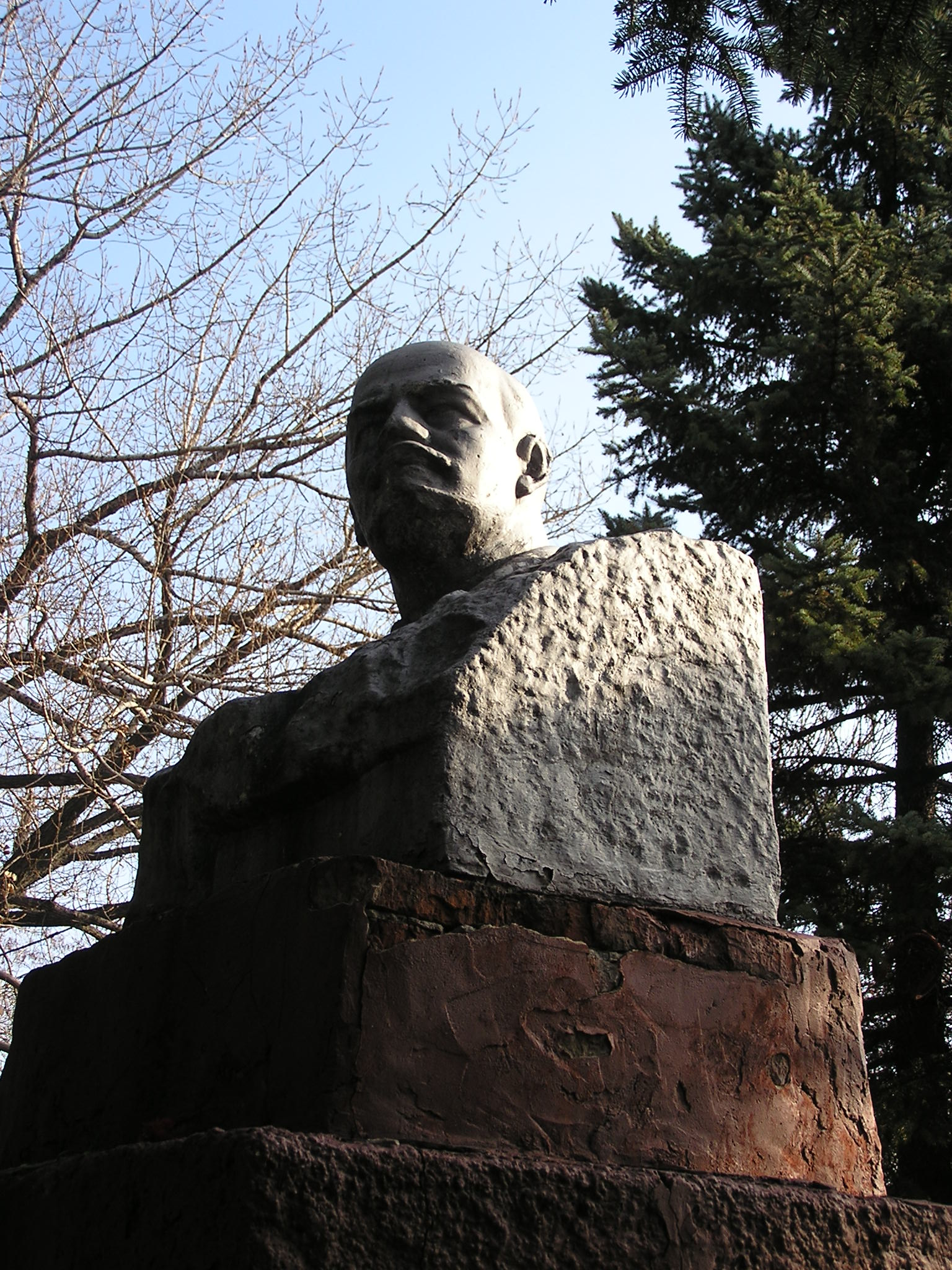
Lenin bust

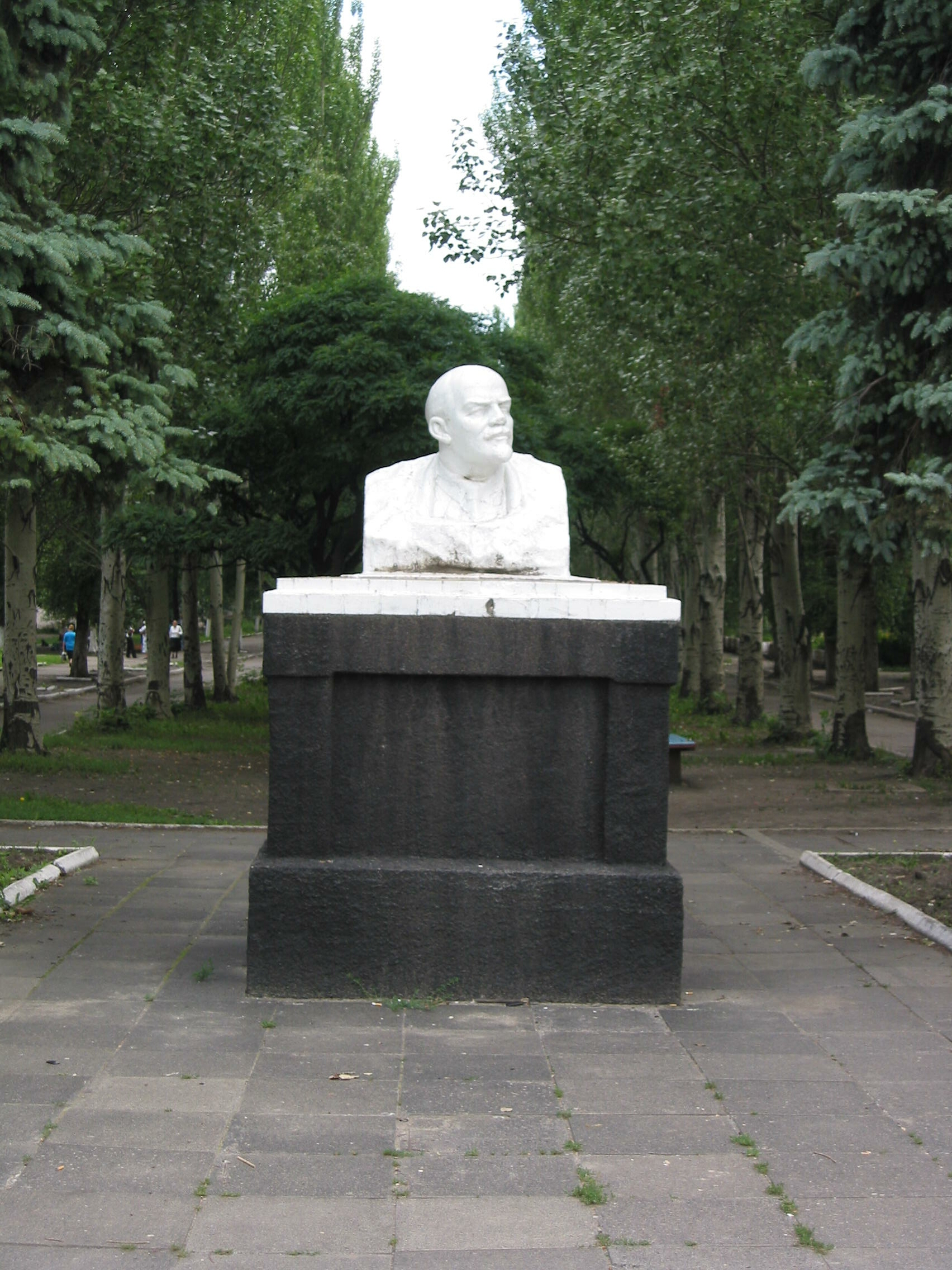
Another Lenin bust

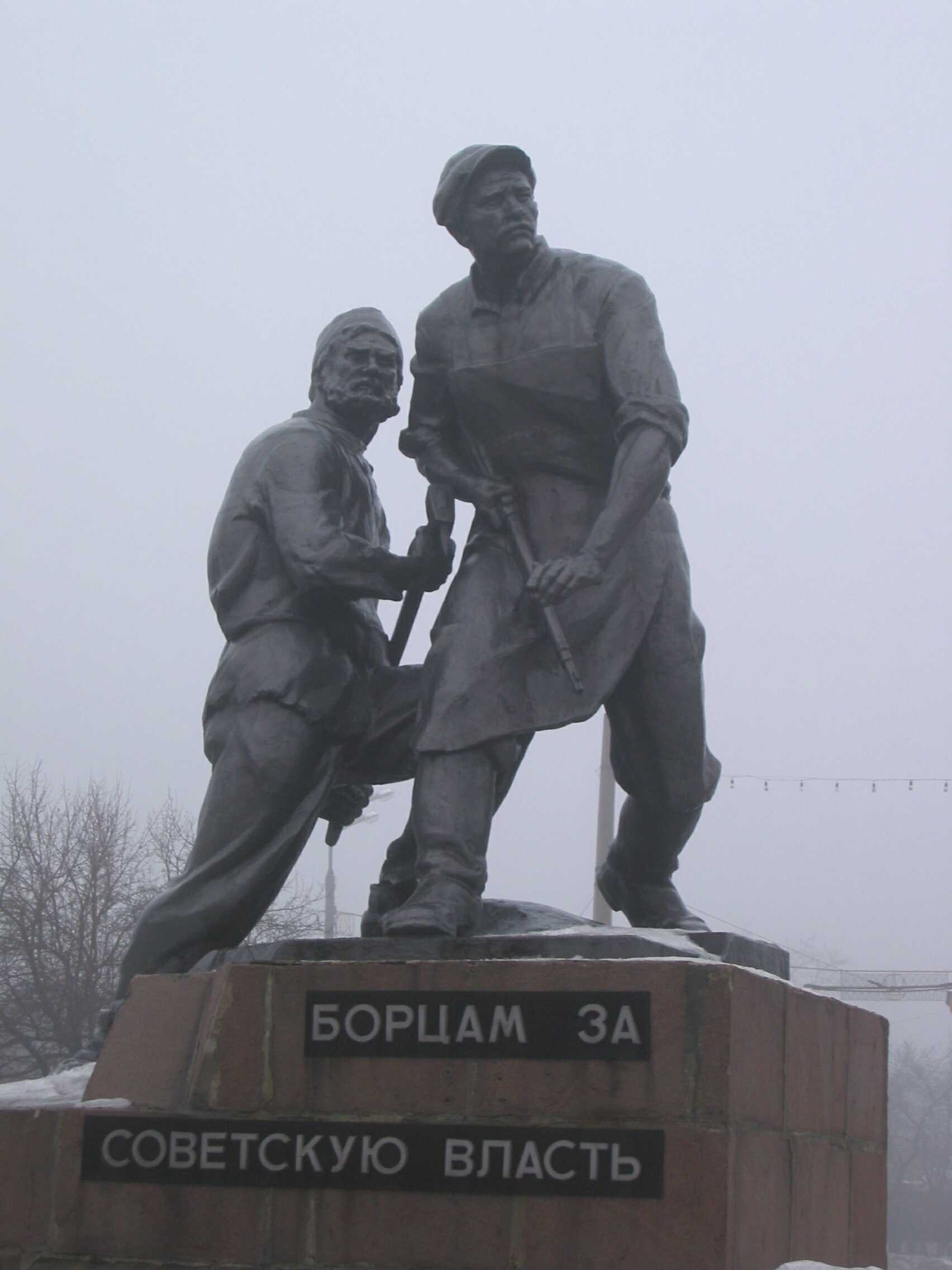
Monument to fighters for the Soviet regime

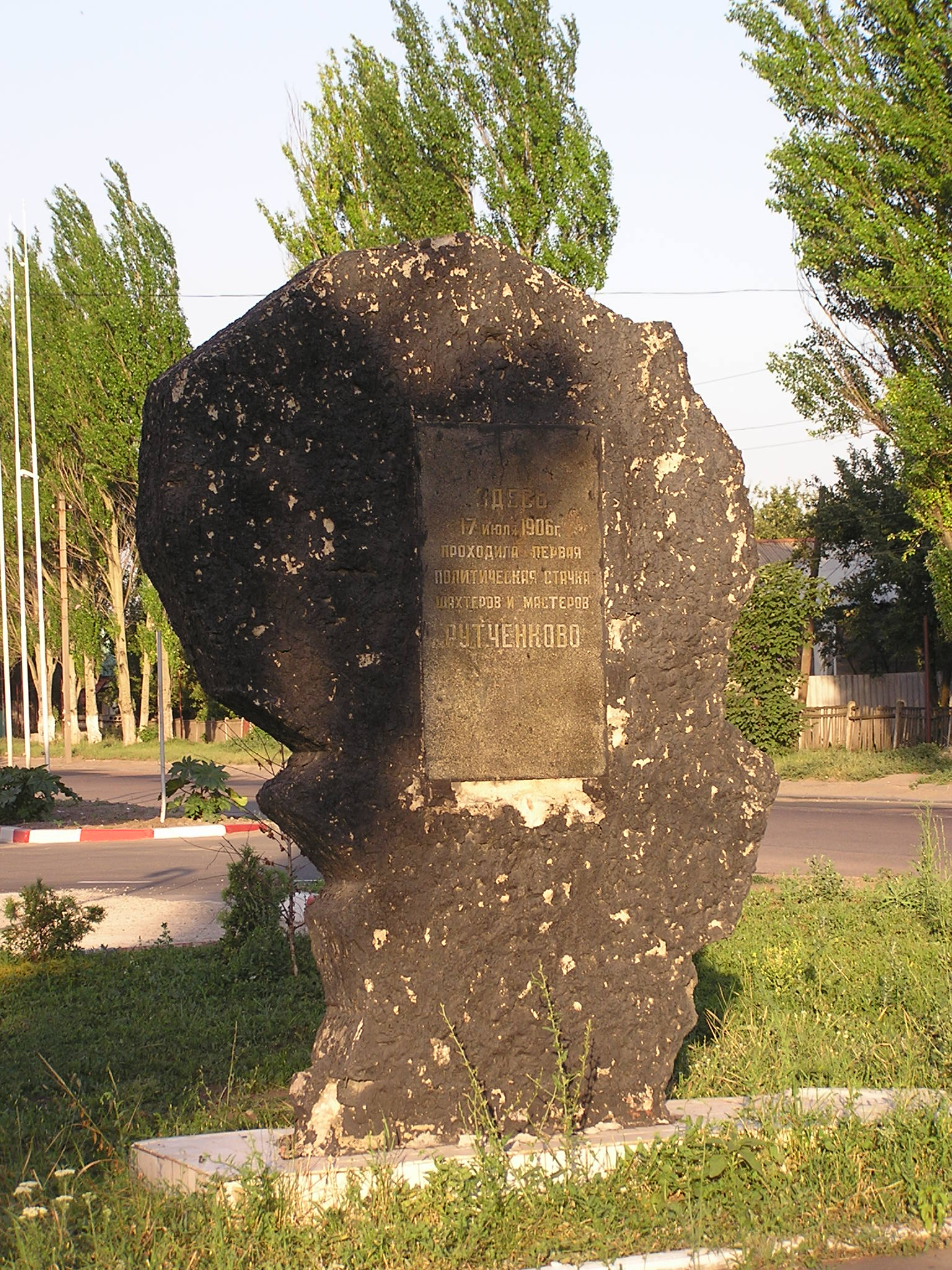
Monument to the first political strike in Rutchenkovo
