= Kharkiv cluster bombing =

Kharkiv cluster bombing may refer to these uses of cluster munitions in Kharkiv during the 2022 Russian invasion of Ukraine:

- February 2022 Kharkiv cluster bombing
- March 2022 Kharkiv cluster bombing
- April 2022 Kharkiv cluster bombing

== See also ==
- 2022 Kharkiv bombing (disambiguation)
