= Kharkiv government building airstrike =

2022 Russian attack on Kharkiv, Ukraine

- Part of the bombing of Kharkiv in the Battle of Kharkiv during the Russian invasion of Ukraine
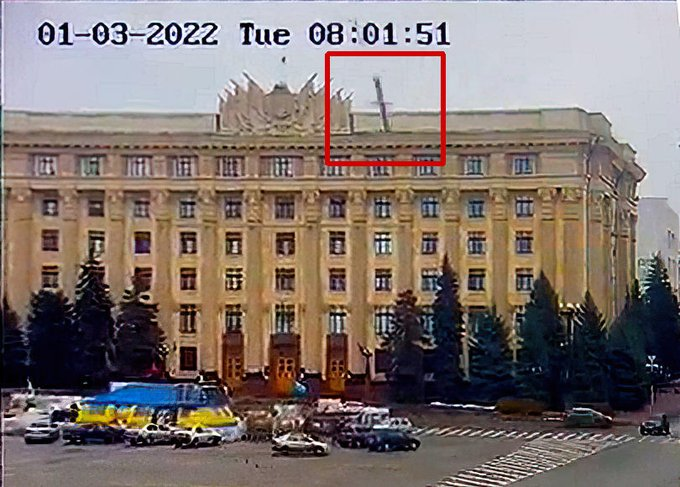
- Building of the regional government, which was damaged with Russian missiles that exploded near Freedom Square and in its right wing
- Location: 50.00421°N 36.23631°E; Kharkiv Regional State Administration and Regional Council in Kharkiv, Ukraine
- Date: March 1, 2022; ~8:01 and ~8:13 (UTC+3)
- Target: The Kharkiv Regional State Administration Building
- Attack type: Airstrike
- Weapon: two cruise missiles "Kalibr"
- Deaths: 29
- Injuries: 35+
- Perpetrator: Russian Armed Forces

External videos
- Відеозапис з камери спостереження on YouTube at the moment of the impact of Russian missiles on Freedom Square and on the building of the Kharkiv Regional State Administration (OVA))

The Kharkiv government building airstrike occurred on March 1, 2022, when Russian forces attacked the government administrative building of the Kharkiv oblast in the Kharkiv city.

== Air attack ==
The attack on the Kharkiv government building took place in the context of the battle of Kharkiv against Russian hostiles coming from the northwest.

On March 1, at 8:01 and 8:13 a.m. of EET, Russian military forces fired two missiles against the administration building. This resulted in the death of 29 people, the destruction of the right wing of the building and serious damage to nearby structures in the Freedom Square area. In June 2022, the government building had been recognized as not subject to restoration.

On August 28, 2022, Russian armed forces attacked the building again with two S-300 ballistic missiles fired from Belgorod Oblast. The first one made a crater near the right wing of the administration building, and the second one hit the three floor structure behind. There were no casualties after that attack.

== Details ==
It was recorded that the attack weapon were two missiles Kalibr, the attack left an estimated 35 wounded and 29 dead.

== Aftermath ==
On November 13, 2023, a man in Kharkiv was sentenced to life imprisonment for providing information to Russia that contributed to airstrikes on the city, including that on the Regional State Administration building.

== See also ==
- Mykolaiv government building airstrike
- February 2022 Kharkiv cluster bombing
- March 2022 Kharkiv cluster bombing
- April 2022 Kharkiv cluster bombing
