= 2024 Pokrovsk missile strike =

2024 Russian attack against Pokrovsk, Ukraine

- Part of Attacks on civilians in the Russian invasion of Ukraine
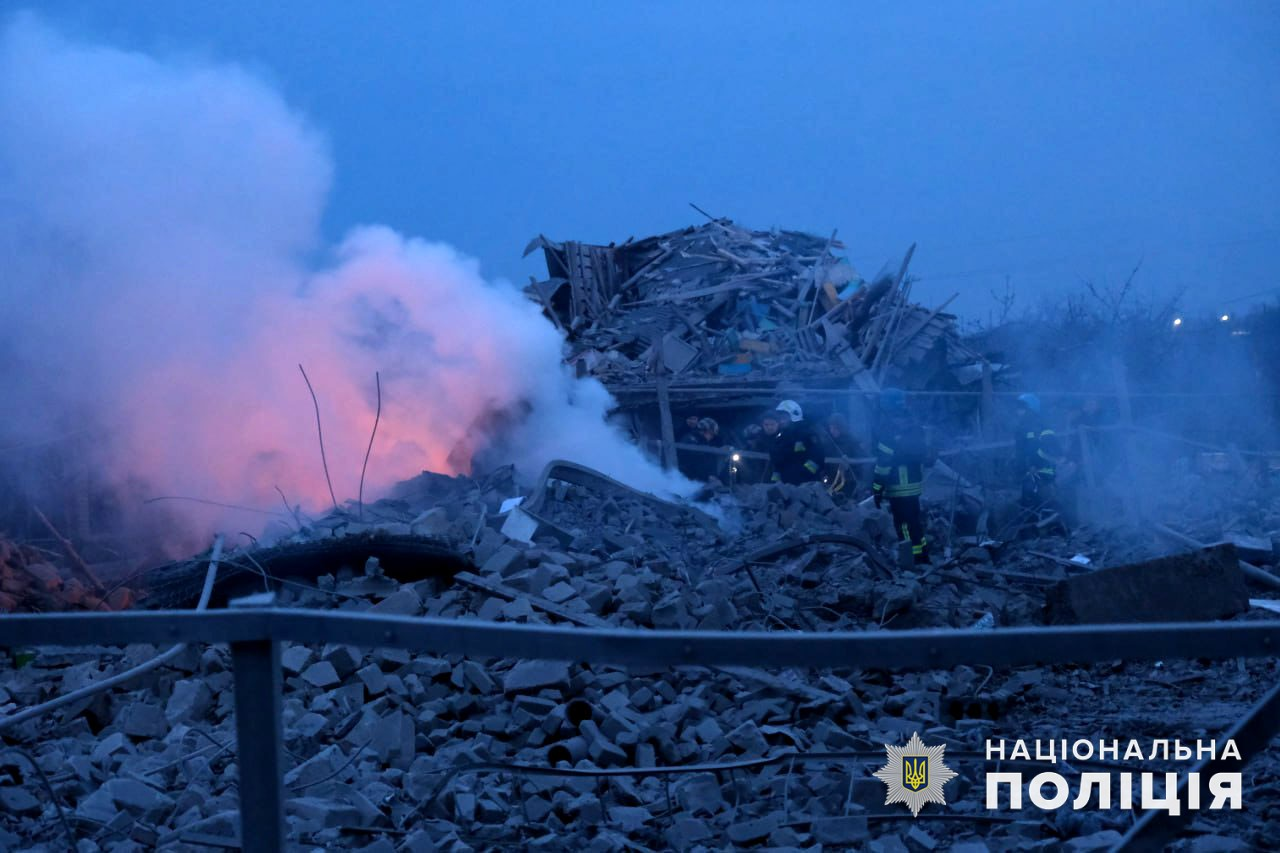
- Aftermath of attack
- Location: Pokrovsk, Ukraine
- Date: 6 January 2024
- Attack type: Missile strike
- Weapon: S-300
- Deaths: 12 (6 children among them)
- Injuries: 10
- Perpetrator: Russian Armed Forces

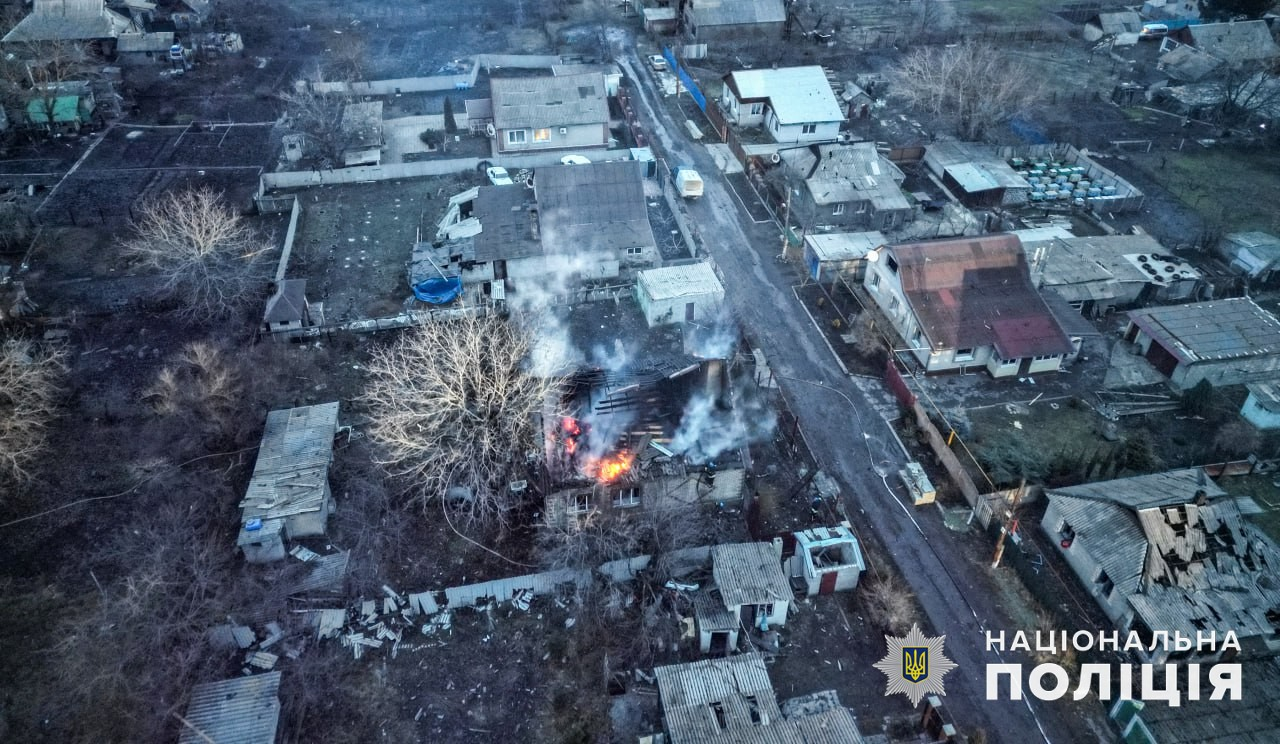
A home destroyed as a result of the shelling

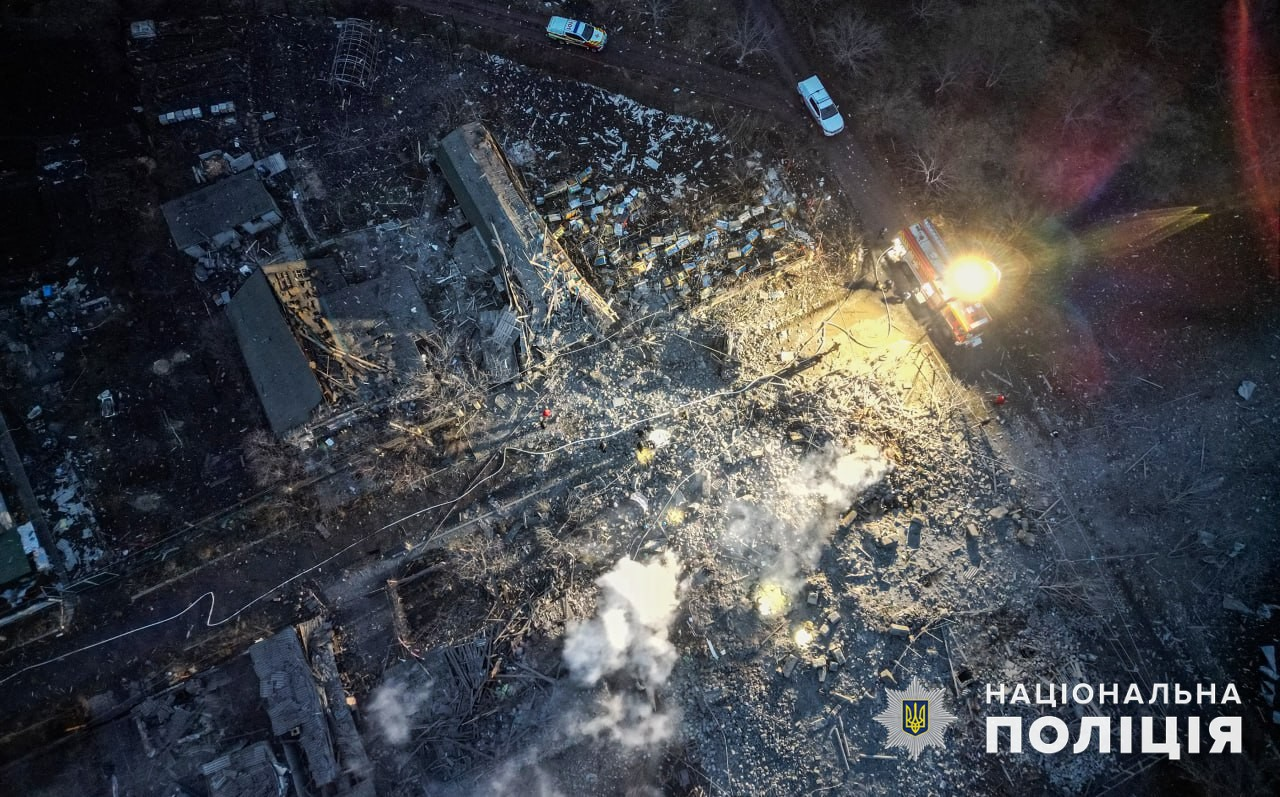
Ruins of the house

On 6 January 2024, at around 3:00 pm local time, during the Russian invasion of Ukraine, the Russian Army launched an S-300 missile attack against a residential building in Pokrovsk, Donetsk Oblast, eastern Ukraine, as a result of which 12 people died, including 6 children.

== Shelling ==
On the night of January 6, the Russians shelled the private sector, as a result of which the garage and cars caught fire. The strike at the administrative building was also recorded. In Rivne, Pokrovsk Raion, a private house in which 6 people lived was destroyed.

Earlier on that day, Ukraine hit the Saky air base in Russian-occupied Crimea.

== Reactions ==
President of Ukraine Volodymyr Zelenskyy said in a video message "These hours, a rescue operation is underway in Pokrovsk of the Donetsk region and in the Pokrovsk Raion after a Russian missile strike. S-300 missiles. Necessary rescue forces, equipment of the State Emergency Service of Ukraine are involved. Debris is being sorted out. As of this time, it is known about the death of more than ten people, and among them — children, unfortunately... My condolences to all those who lost relatives!". Zelenskyy emphasized, "no one strike will remain without consequences for Russia."

== See also ==
- 2023 Pokrovsk missile strike
- 2022 Crimean Bridge explosion
- 2022 missile explosion in Poland
- 2023 Belgorod Oblast incursions
- July 2023 Crimean Bridge explosion
- 29 December 2023 Russian strikes on Ukraine
- 30 December 2023 Belgorod shelling
- 2 January 2024 Russian strikes on Ukraine
- Attacks in Russia during the Russian invasion of Ukraine
- Attacks on civilians in the Russian invasion of Ukraine
- Aerial warfare in the Russian invasion of Ukraine
- Bombing of Kharkiv (2022–present)
- Russian strikes against Ukrainian infrastructure (2022–present)
- Timeline of the Russian invasion of Ukraine (1 December 2023 – present)
