= Lyman cluster bombing =

Attack during the 2023 Russian invasion of Ukraine

July 2023 Lyman cluster bombing
- Part of the Russian invasion of Ukraine
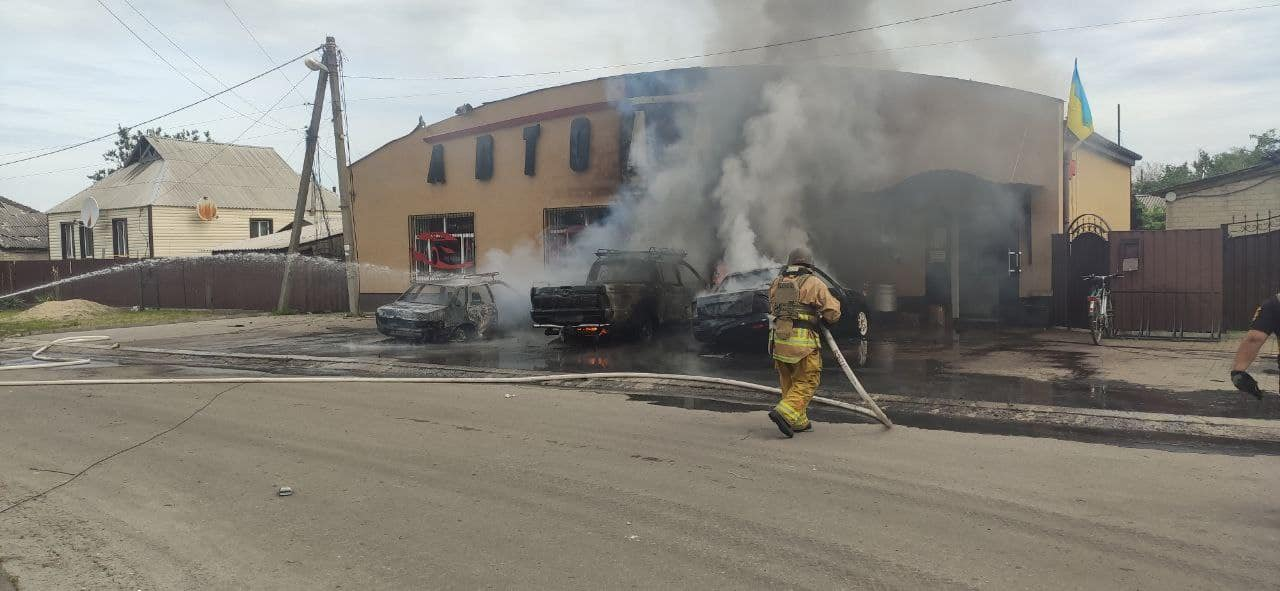
- A damaged building in Lyman after the attack
- Location: Lyman, Ukraine
- Date: 8 July 2023
- Target: Ukrainian civilians
- Attack type: cluster munition bombing
- Deaths: 9
- Injuries: 13
- Perpetrator: Russia
- Motive: Unknown

On 8 July 2023, at around 9:55 a.m., during the Russian invasion of Ukraine, the Russian Armed Forces shelled the residential area in the center of Lyman with 9M55K-series Smerch cluster munition. Lyman was at the time approximately 15 kilometers west of Russian-occupied territories. The bombing killed 9 civilians, while 13 were wounded. It targeted the crossing of Nezalezhnosti and Dubonosa Streets, where locals were selling and trading vegetables grown in their gardens.

It happened during Russia's failed military offensive towards Lyman. Due to the indiscriminate nature of these weapons used in densely populated areas, Human Rights Watch described these strikes as a possible war crime. France likewise described this attack on civilians as a war crime and condemned Russia for it.

== See also ==
- Russian war crimes
- March 2022 Kharkiv cluster bombing
- April 2022 Kharkiv cluster bombing
- 2023 Uman missile strike
