= Udachne =

Urban locality in Donetsk Oblast, Ukraine

Udachne Удачне
- Rural settlement
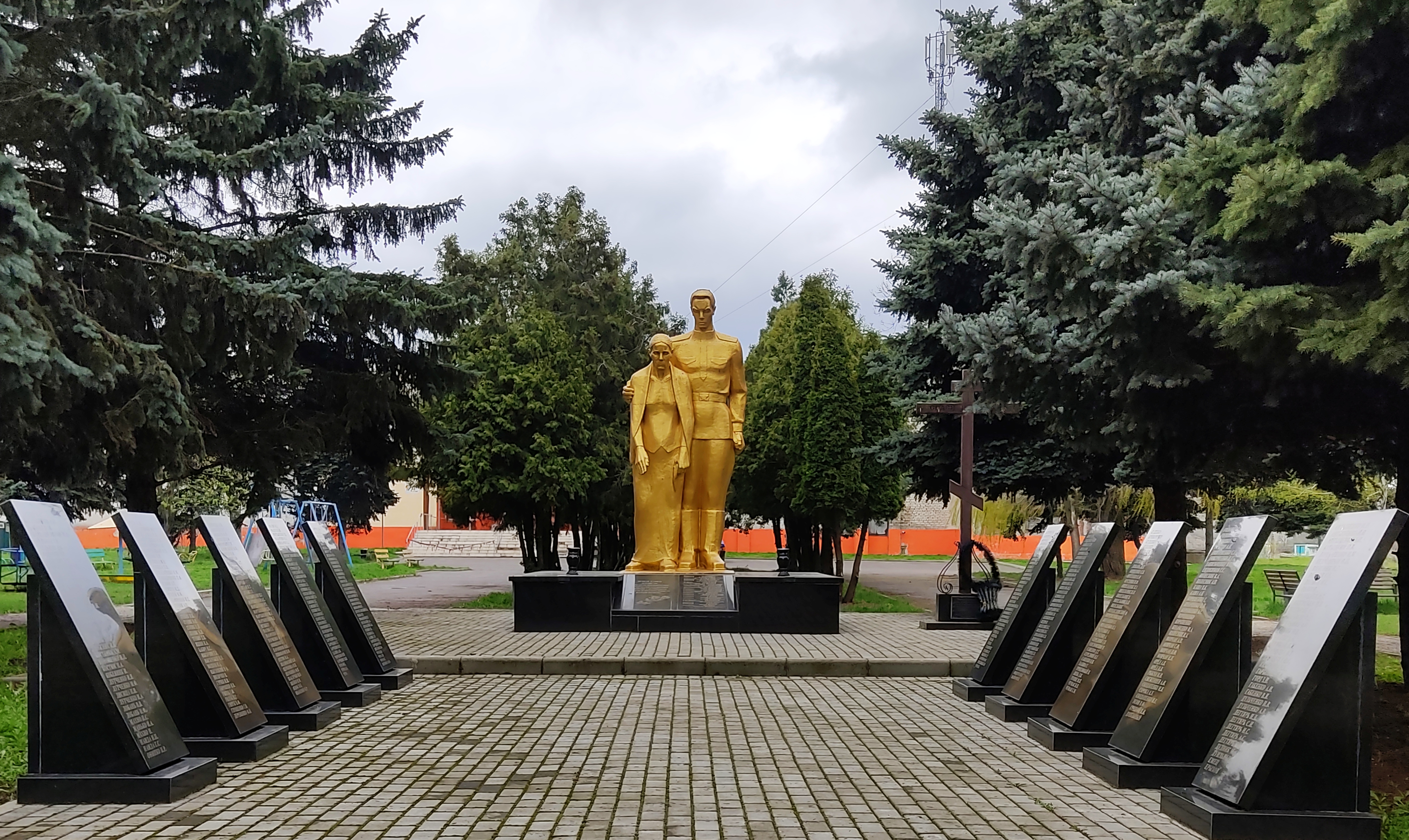

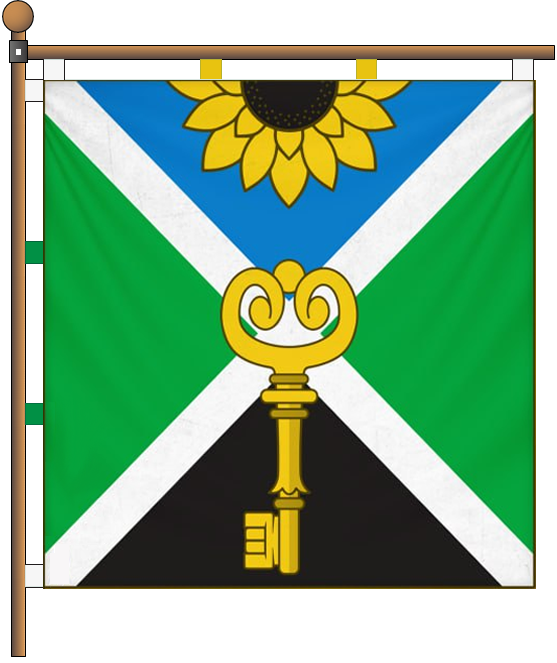
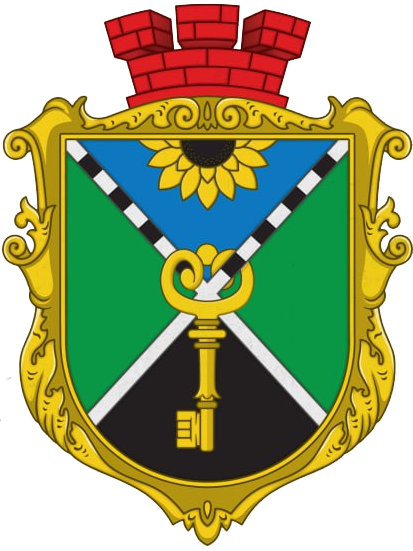
- Flag Coat of arms
- Interactive map of Udachne
- Location of Udachne Udachne (Ukraine)
- Coordinates: 48°14′27″N 36°59′31″E
- Country: Ukraine
- Oblast: Donetsk Oblast
- Raion: Pokrovsk Raion
- Hromada: Udachne settlement hromada
- Elevation: 171 m (561 ft)

Population (2022)
  - Total: 1,633
- Time zone: UTC+2
  - Summer (DST): UTC+3
- Postal code: 85334-85336
- Area code: +380 623

Udachne (Ukrainian: Удачне) is a rural settlement in Pokrovsk Raion, Donetsk Oblast, eastern Ukraine. It is the administrative center of Udachne settlement hromada, one of the hromadas of Ukraine. The population is 1,633 (2022 estimate).

== History ==
During the Russo-Ukrainian War and the Russian invasion of Ukraine, Udachne came in proximity of hostilities between Russian and Ukrainian forces in December 2024. In the light of a broader Russian offensive to reach Pokrovsk and surrounding cities, the Russian forces likely captured the settlement of Shevchenko to the east on 15 December, beginning fighting at the nearby settlements of Novovasylivka, Solone, Pischane and Udachne.

In August 2025, Ukraine's Prosecutor General's Office opened a war crimes investigation into the shooting and killing of a civilian trying to evacuate from Udachne. A video posted on Telegram was described as showing the civilian carrying a suitcase with what appeared to be belongings walking on the side of the road, when he was gunned down by a Russian soldier in an ambush position in a nearby building.

By 28 August 2025, Russian forces captured the town.

== Demographics ==
During the Soviet era by 1989, the town had 1,800 inhabitants. The population as of December 2024 was 300 people.

Native language as of the Ukrainian Census of 2001:

- Ukrainian 87.65%
- Russian 12.00%
- Belarusian 0.29%
- Moldovan (Romanian) 0.06%

== Economy ==
One of the largest coal mines in Ukraine is located in the village. The mine is operated by the Pokrovsk Mine Management. Because of the Russian war of aggression, the site is under constant danger of shelling.

In July 2021, an explosion occurred in the coal mine, injuring 10 miners in the blast. The affected workers were hospitalized in the Pokrovsk-based Central District Hospital.
