= 2023 Pokrovsk missile strike =

Attack during the 2023 Russian invasion of Ukraine

Pokrovsk missile strike
- Part of attacks on civilians in the Russian invasion of Ukraine
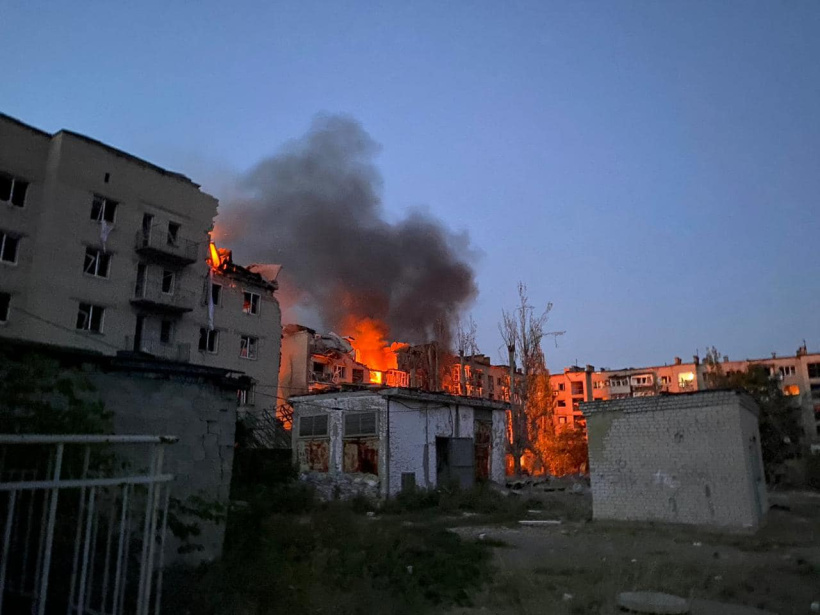
- Fire in a damaged residential building in Pokrovsk after the attack
- The apartment building that the Russians hit with the first rocket Druzhba Hotel is the epicenter of the second rocket explosion
- Location: 48°16′56.5″N 37°10′34.9″E; Pokrovsk, Ukraine
- Date: 7 August 2023; 7:15 p.m. and 7:52 p.m.
- Target: Ukrainian civilians
- Attack type: Ballistic Missile Strike
- Weapon: Iskander short-range ballistic missiles
- Deaths: 10
- Injuries: 88(among them two children)
- Perpetrator: Armed Forces of the Russian Federation
- Motive: Unknown

On 7 August 2023, at around 7:15 p.m., during the Russo-Ukrainian War, the Russian Armed Forces used Iskander short-range ballistic missiles to strike the Ukrainian city of Pokrovsk, Donetsk Oblast, twice.

== Strike ==
After the first strike, the Russian forces waited for 40 minutes until rescue workers arrived to the scene to try to save the wounded and survivors buried in the rubble, and then launched a second strike which killed an official from the emergency services and wounded more people at the scene. 10 people were reported killed from the strikes, and 82 wounded. The search for further survivors was thus abandoned out of fear of another strike against rescue workers. After a few days, 122 tonnes of rubble were removed from the areas that were struck.

The strikes damaged at least 12 multi-story buildings, including a hotel and a five-floor apartment block. The Russian Defense Ministry claimed that its forces had hit a command post of Ukrainian army, though they referred to Pokrovsk by its defunct Soviet name, "Krasnoarmeysk". Ukrainian government rejected this claim and pointed out that the attack was reckless and aimed against civilian areas. The "double tap" attack was previously also used by the Russian forces in the Syrian civil war in order to maximize casualties.

== See also ==
- July 2023 Lyman cluster bombing
- April 2023 Sloviansk airstrike
- 2023 Uman missile strike
- Russian war crimes

== Reactions ==
President Volodymyr Zelenskyy, in an online statement, accused Russia of trying to leave nothing but “broken and scorched stones” in eastern Ukraine. His remarks accompanied footage of a damaged, five-storey residential building with one floor partially destroyed.

== Gallery ==
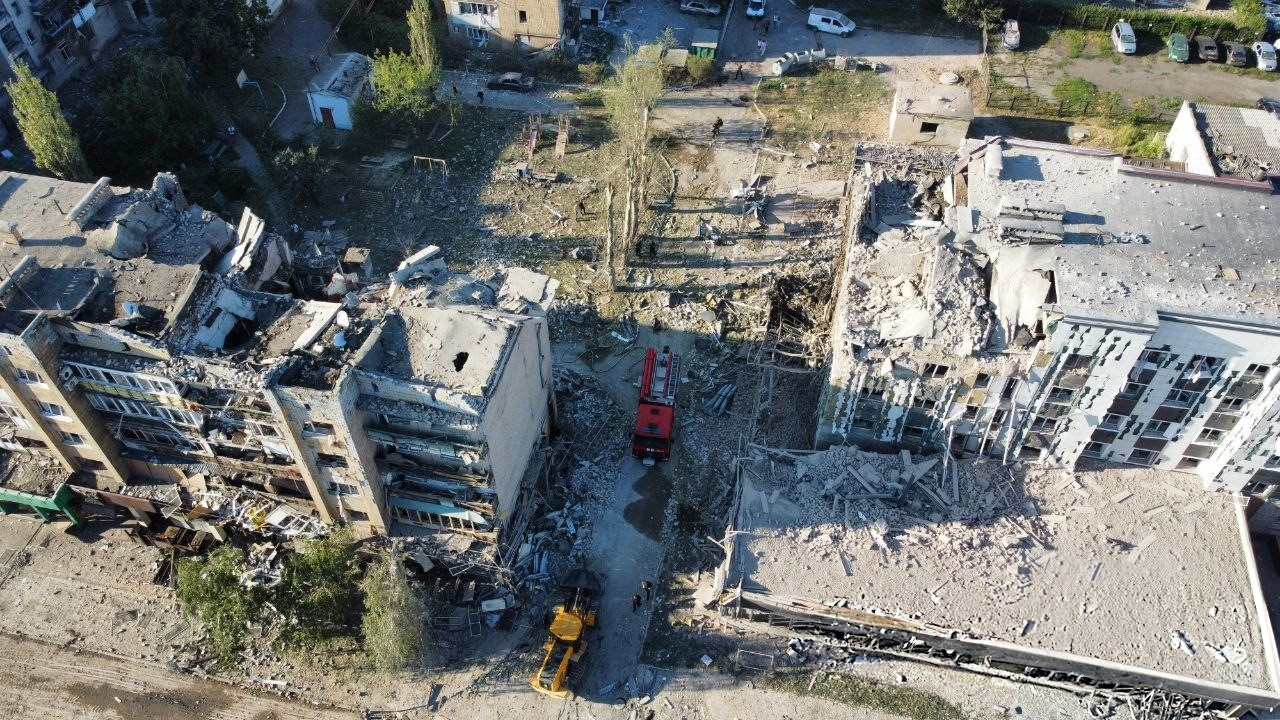
Aerial view of the damage with condition of the residential building (left) and Drujba hotel (right) after the attack.

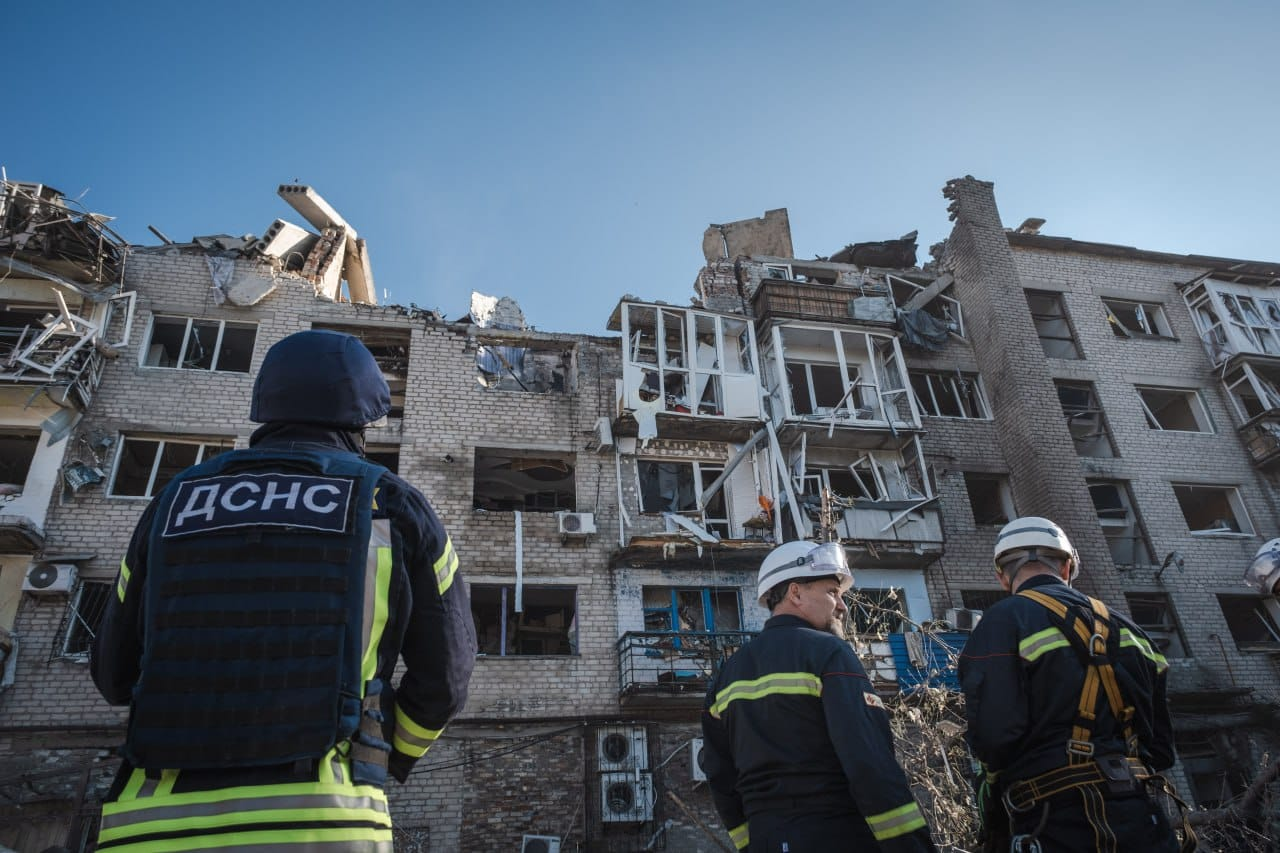
The residential building that was targeted by the first missile.

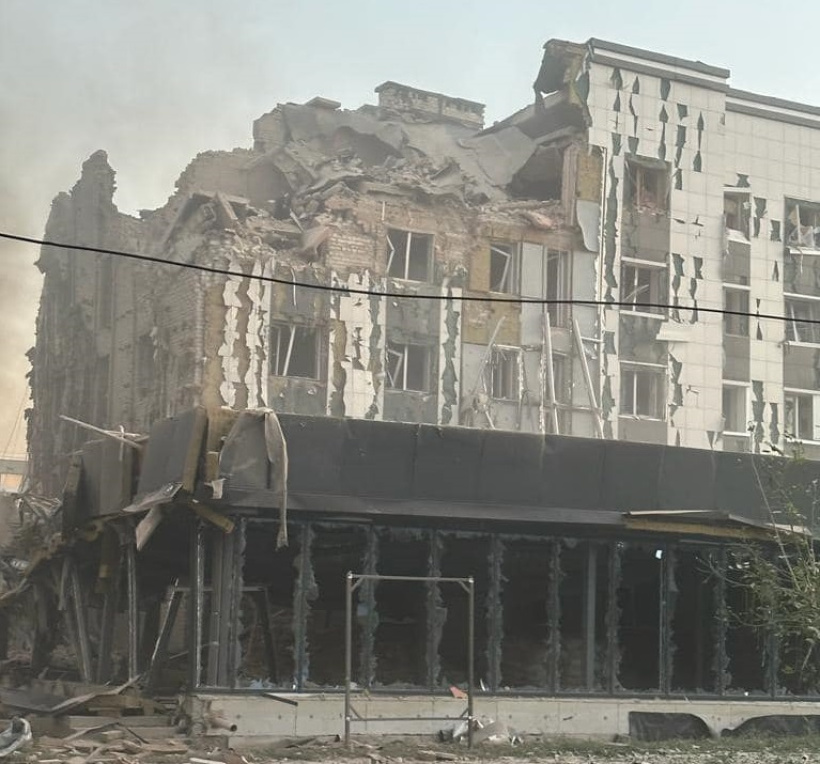
Drujba Hotel, which was targeted by the second missile.

Removing debris from the area
