= Valeriy Kurinskyi =

Ukrainian scientist and poet (1939–2015)

- Валерій Куринський
- Born: July 18, 1939; Krasnoarmiisk, Donetsk Oblast, Ukrainian SSR, Soviet Union (now Ukraine)
- Died: May 3, 2015 (aged 75); Kyiv, Ukraine
- Education: Kyiv National Linguistic University
- Occupations: Philosopher, writer, translator, musicologist
- Known for: Theory of autogenous training ("autodidactics")
- Notable work: Introduction to Hyperionics

Valeriy Oleksandrovych Kurinskyi (July 13, 1939 - May 3, 2015) was a Ukrainian scientist, philosopher, writer, poet, composer, musician, polyglot, translator from more than a hundred languages, and researcher. He was the author of translations of Levinas, Rilke, Quasimodo, Bin Sin, Tatar poets. He developed his own unique systems for the simultaneous study of several foreign languages.

== Biography ==
Kurinskyi was born on July 13, 1939, in the city of Pokrovsk (then Krasnoarmiiske), Donetsk region, Soviet Ukraine. As an early child during World War II, he and his family were sent to a concentration camp near Vienna, in Austerlitz.

He graduated from the Kyiv Conservatory in the violin class, which he graduated in 1969. By the age of twenty-five, he had mastered about forty languages on his own. After graduating from the Kyiv Conservatory, he was offered the position of head of the literary part of the Kyiv Opera House. It was here that he first met Yevhenia Miroshnychenko, Gizela Tsypola, and Anatoliy Solovyanenko. Working in the opera, he continues to write poems for songs, songs for movies. A year later, Kurinsky was offered a new position - Executive Secretary of the Union of Composers of Ukraine. He held a congress of composers, at which the prominent composer Valentin Silvestrov was admitted to the composers' union, although before that his documents were dropped from the lists of candidates for admission.

In 2002-2003, Kurinsky was the host of the TV program "Theater of Thought" (Kyiv).

Valery Kurinsky died on May 3, 2015, in Kyiv. On May 8, 2015, a farewell ceremony took place in the building of the National Union of Composers of Ukraine. Buried in Baikove Cemetery.

== Postpsychological Autodidactics ==
Valery Kurinskaya is the author of the method "Autodidactics", which is a system for self-learning and self-improvement, which offers a number of methods for managing the process of self-education, which in essence involve the management of mental processes.

== Bibliography ==
- "Autodidactics. Theses. Poems. Experience in studying Chinese hieroglyphics ”(1990)
- "Hear another (sonnets)" (1993)
- Autodidactics ”, part 1 (1994)
- “ When there is no governess ”(1997)
- "Mouth Aerobics" (1997)
- "General Theory of Skill" (1997)
- "Empty Sets (prose). Sonnets ”(1999)
- “Emanuel Levinas. Between us. The study of thought-about-another ”(1999)
- "Three Books and" Aphorisms "" (2003)
- “Chords. Poems and Aphorisms (2003)
- "Ukrainian Autodidactics" (2006)
