= 2022 Kharkiv bombing =

2022 Kharkiv bombing may refer to these incidents in Kharkiv during the 2022 Russian invasion of Ukraine:

- Kharkiv cluster bombing (various incidents)
- Kharkiv government building airstrike
