= Udachne settlement hromada =

Udachne settlement hromada Удачненська селищна громада
- Hromada
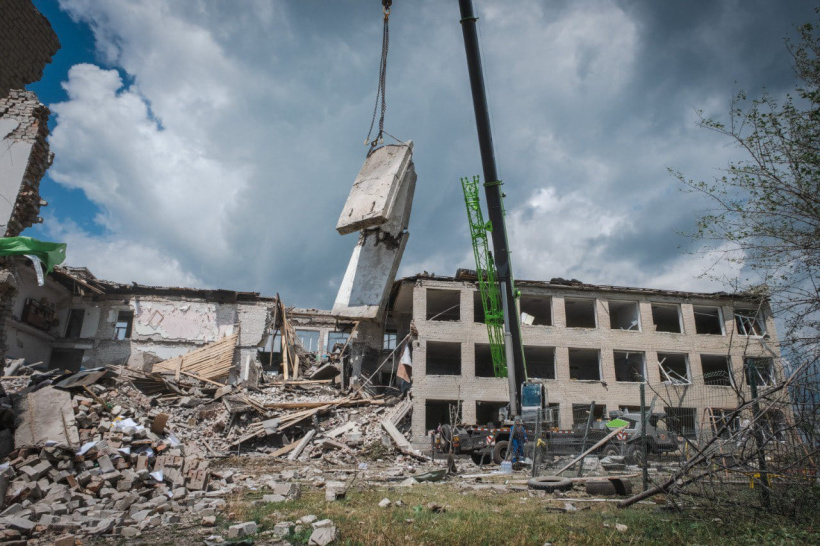
- School in Serhiivka village (Donetsk region of Ukraine) after Russian rocket strike on 30 June 2023.
- Interactive map of Udachne settlement hromada
- Country: Ukraine
- Oblast: Donetsk
- Raion: Pokrovsk

Area
  - Total: 216.0 km^{2} (83.4 sq mi)

Population (2020)
  - Total: 3,910
  - Density: 18.1/km^{2} (46.9/sq mi)
- Settlements: 7
- Villages: 6
- Towns: 1

Udachne settlement hromada (Ukrainian: Удачненська селищна громада) is a hromada of Ukraine, located in Pokrovsk Raion, Donetsk Oblast. Its administrative center is the town of Udachne.

It has an area of 216.0 square kilometres (83.4 mi^{2}) and a population of 3,910, as of 2020.

The hromada includes 7 settlements: 1 town (Udachne) and 6 villages:

- Kalinivka
- Molodetske
- Muravka
- Novomykolaivka
- Novoserhiivka
- Serhiivka

== Demographics ==
As of the 2001 Ukrainian census, the hromada had a population of 4,699 inhabitants. The composition of the population by their native languages was as follows:

Native languages (2001)
	percent
Ukrainian	90.4%
Russian	9.3%
Belarusian	0.2%
others	0.1%

== See also ==
- List of hromadas of Ukraine
