= March 2022 Kharkiv cluster bombing =

Incident during the Russian invasion of Ukraine

- Part of the bombing of Kharkiv in the Battle of Kharkiv during the Russian invasion of Ukraine
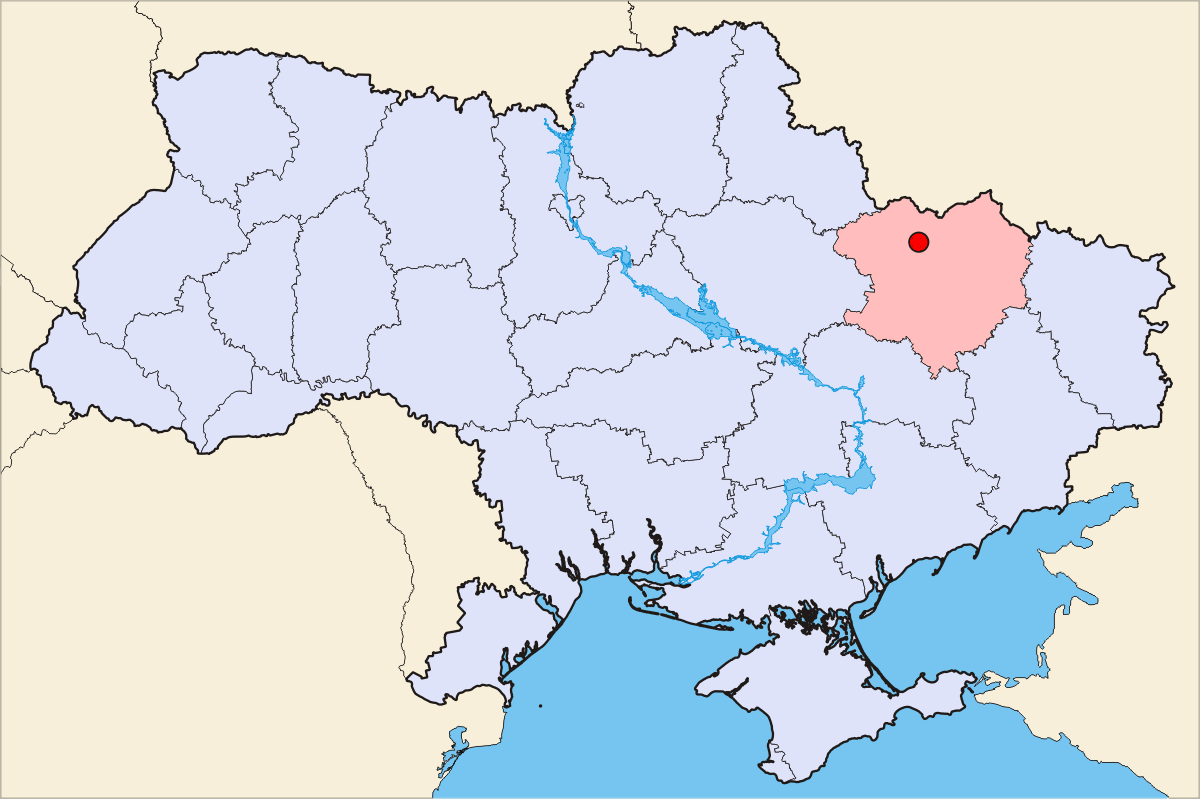
- Kharkiv on the map of Ukraine
- Location: Kharkiv, Ukraine
- Date: 24 March 2022
- Target: Ukrainian civilians
- Attack type: cluster munition bombing, BM-27 Uragan
- Deaths: 6
- Injuries: 15
- Perpetrator: Russian Armed Forces
- Motive: Unknown

On 24 March 2022, a rocket strike by the Russian Armed Forces killed 6 civilians and wounded 15 more during the battle of Kharkiv, part of the Russian invasion of Ukraine. The Russian Army used 9N210/9N235 cluster munition and BM-27 Uragan multiple rocket launcher in the attack. Due to the indiscriminate nature of these weapons used in densely populated areas, Amnesty International described these strikes as a possible Russian war crime.

== Attack ==
On 24 March 2022, a Russian missile strike hit a shopping mall parking lot near the Akademika Pavlova metro station. At the time, hundreds of people were waiting outside a post office in the mall to obtain humanitarian aid. After the strike, the people panicked and ran away from the scene of the crime. Six people were killed and at least 15 further were injured. A local police officer recalled that "shrapnel was falling like rain". Two further cluster bombings damaged the nearby Holy Trinity Church where volunteers were preparing humanitarian aid. Shrapnel fell through the church's wall and roof.

== Investigations ==
Amnesty International found evidence of Russian forces repeatedly using 9N210/9N235 cluster munitions as well as scatterable mines, both of which are subject to international treaty bans - Convention on Cluster Munitions and Ottawa Treaty. Amnesty International concluded that these indiscriminate attacks, resulting in civilian deaths, are war crimes.

== See also ==
- Mykolaiv cluster bombing
- February 2022 Kharkiv cluster bombing
- April 2022 Kharkiv cluster bombing
