= Pokrovsk =

City in Donetsk Oblast, Ukraine

Pokrovsk Покровськ
- City
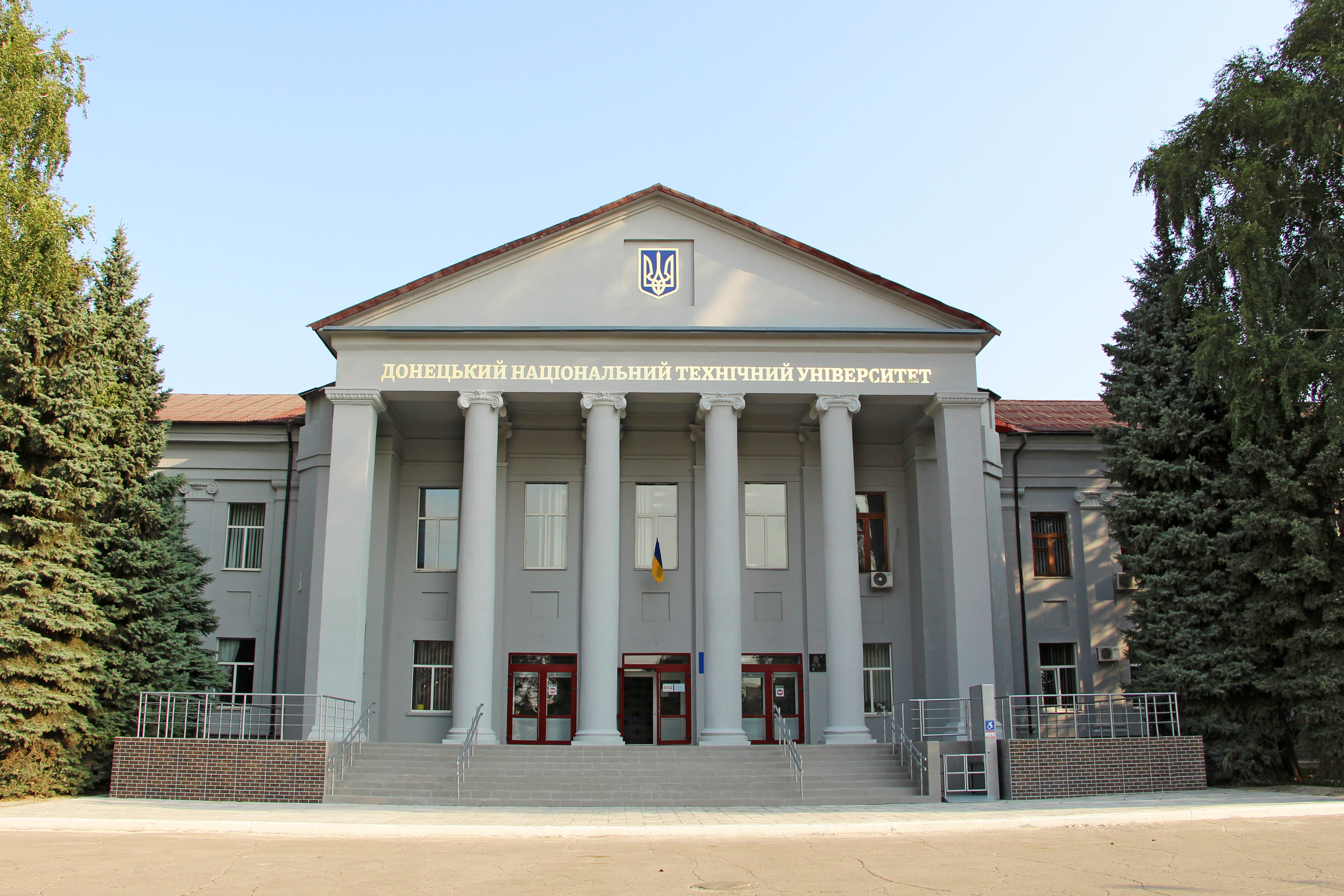
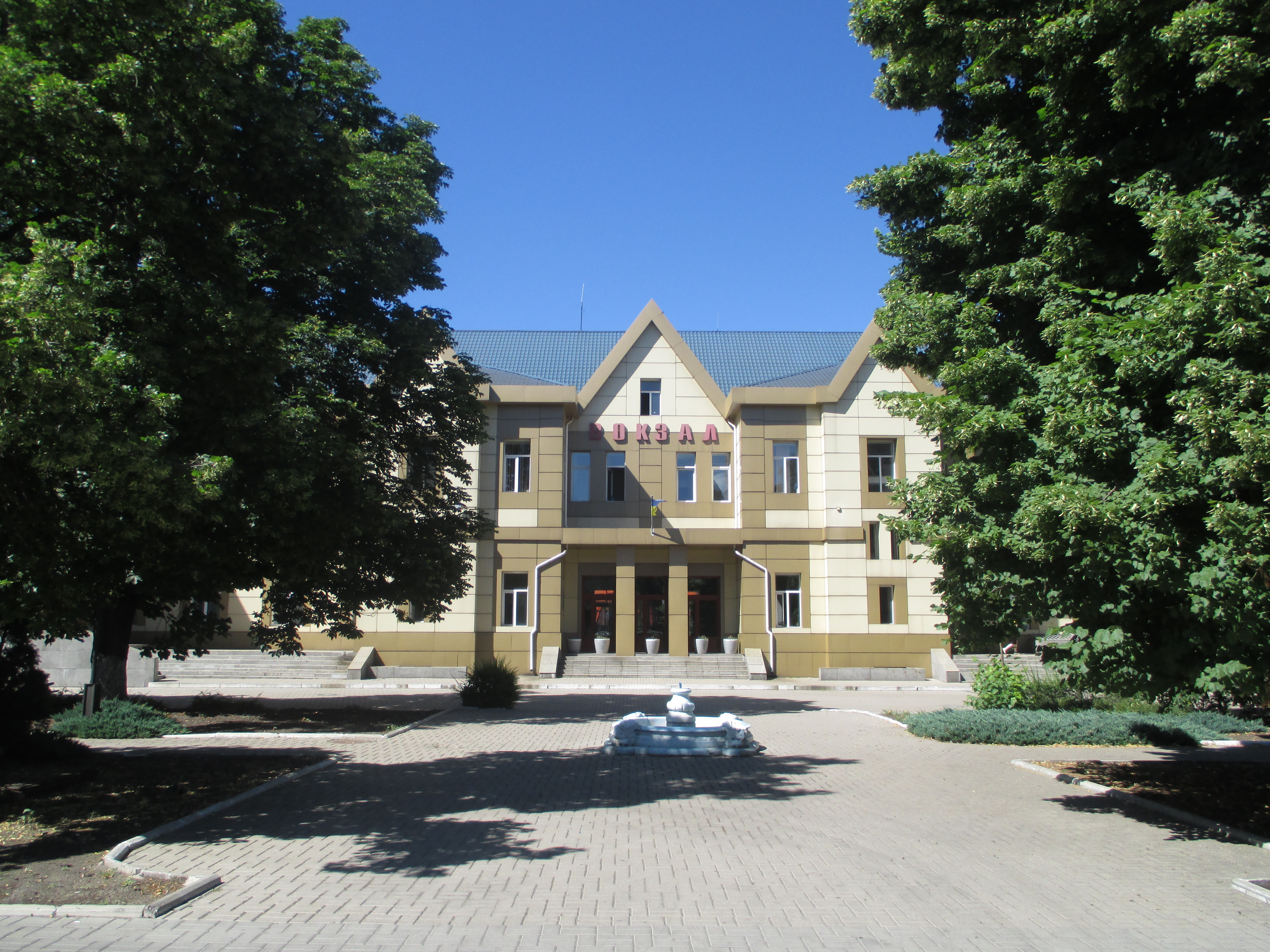
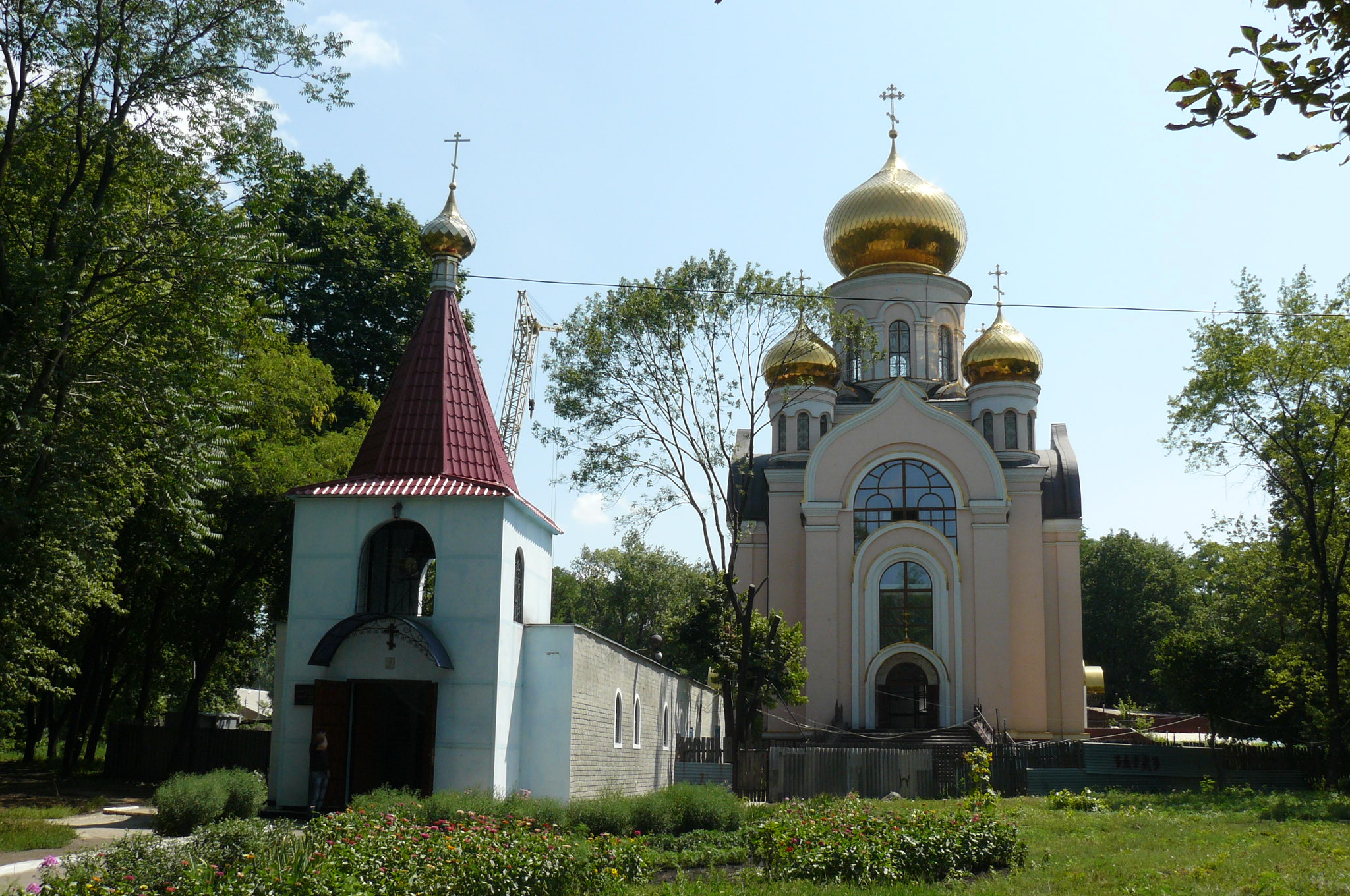
- Donetsk National Technical University Railway station St. Michael the Archangel Church

- Flag Coat of arms
- Interactive map of Pokrovsk
- Pokrovsk shown within Donetsk Pokrovsk shown within Ukraine
- Coordinates: 48°16′58″N 37°10′58″E
- Country: Ukraine
- Oblast: Donetsk Oblast
- Raion: Pokrovsk Raion
- Hromada: Pokrovsk urban hromada
- Established: c. 1880
- City status: 1938

Government
  - Mayor: Ruslan Trebushkin

Area
  - Total: 29.57 km^{2} (11.42 sq mi)
- Elevation: 181 m (594 ft)

Population (August 2025)
  - Total: 1,500
  - Density: 51/km^{2} (130/sq mi)
- Postal code: 85300—85309
- Area code: +380-6239
- Climate: Warm summer subtype
- KOATUU: 1413200000
- KATOTTH: UA14160210010099403
- Website: pokrovsk-rada.gov.ua

Pokrovsk (Ukrainian: Покровськ, IPA: [poˈkrɔu̯sʲk]; Russian: Покровск), formerly known as Krasnoarmiisk (Note: Ukrainian: Красноармійськ; Russian: Красноармейск, romanized: Krasnoarmeysk) (until 2016) and Grishino (Note: Russian: Гришино; Ukrainian: Гришине, romanized: Hryshyne) (until 1934), is a city and the administrative center of Pokrovsk Raion in Donetsk Oblast, Ukraine. It is located 56 kilometres (35 mi) northwest of Donetsk. Before 2020, it was incorporated as a city of oblast significance. Its population was about 60,127 (2022 estimate). As residents fled or were killed during Russia's Pokrovsk offensive, the population declined to around 7,000 as of January 2025, then under 1,500 by late July 2025. Russia captured the city in early 2026.

== Names ==
- 2016–present: Pokrovsk (Ukrainian: Покровськ; Russian: Покровск)
- 1964–2016: Krasnoarmiisk (Ukrainian: Красноармійськ) or Krasnoarmeysk (Russian: Красноармейск, lit. 'Red Army city')
- 1938–1964: Krasnoarmeyskoye (Russian: Красноармейское, lit. 'Red Army village') or Krasnoarmiiske (Ukrainian: Красноармійське)
- 1934–1938: Postyshevo (Russian: Постышево) or Postysheve (Ukrainian: Постишеве)
- 1884–1934: Grishino (Russian: Гришино) or Hryshyne (Ukrainian: Гришине)

== History ==
=== Foundation ===
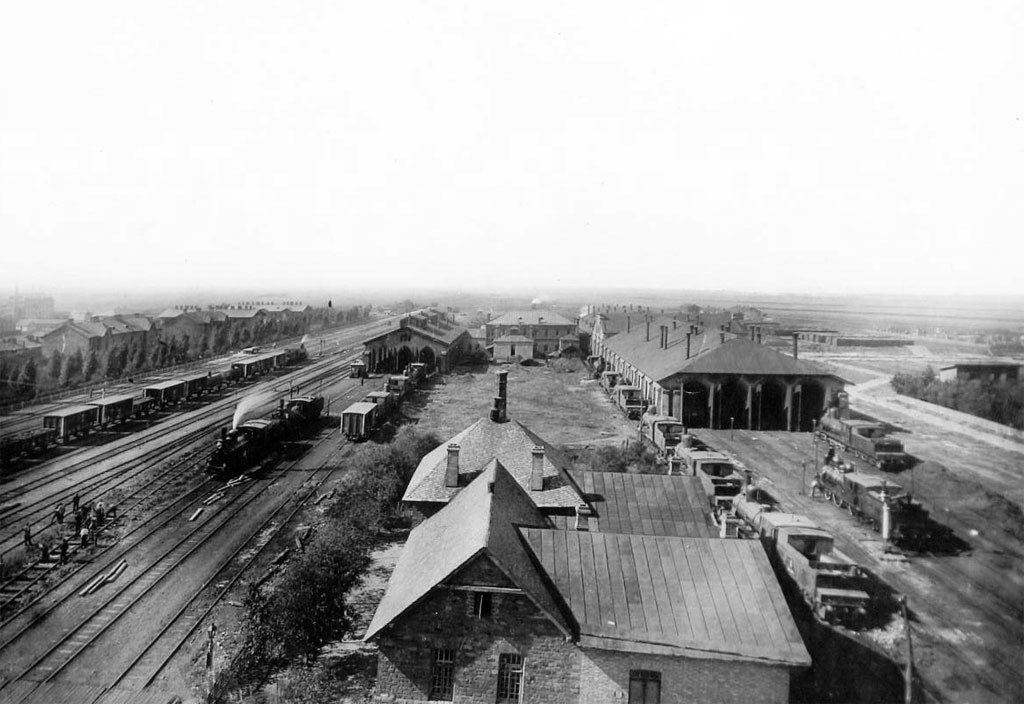
Railway station at the turn of the 19th and 20th centuries

Pokrovsk was founded as Grishino in 1875 by a decision of the Ministry of Railways of the Russian Empire authorizing a railway station. The railway settlement had two thousand inhabitants.

In 1881, a locomotive depot which became one of the main locomotive repair companies, Ekaterinoslavskaya railway, was built in the town. Two years later, in 1883, there was an enlargement to the station building; the central portion survives to this day. In May 1884, trains began transiting the rail station in Grishino.

With the development of the railway station, Grishino grew and there were new businesses, in particular for exploitation of underground minerals, starting with coal. By 1913, the population around Grishino station had more than doubled to about 4.5 thousand people.

During the Ukrainian War of Independence, from 1917 to 1920, it passed between various factions. Afterwards, Hryshyne was administratively part of the Donets Governorate of Ukraine.

After the war, Hryshyne continued its growth and by 1925 had a locomotive depot, a brick factory, and six mines. The name of the station was changed to Postyshevo in 1934 to honor Pavel Postyshev, and in 1938, the name of the city became Krasnoarmeyskoe, commemorating the Soviet Red Army, after Postyshev was repressed during the Great Purge.

=== World War II ===
World War II heavily impacted the population of the city. The first Axis forces to arrive were Italians, followed by the Germans who occupied it on 19 October 1941. German forces proceeded to forcibly transfer many civilians by train to labor camps in Austria. Many residents defended their hometown. 8,295 Soviet soldiers perished on the battlefield and 4,788 residents of the town were killed in World War II. The Germans operated a Nazi prison, a penal forced labour camp and a subcamp of the Stalag 378 prisoner-of-war camp in the city.

The city witnessed an atrocity when its remaining Jewish community was massacred in The Holocaust in Ukraine by the German Nazi army in midwinter 1942. Furthermore, in February 1943, the Red Army perpetrated the massacre of Grishino, in which 508 POWs and 88 civilians were massacred, mainly Germans and Italians, but also Romanians, Ukrainians, Hungarians and Danes. On 8 September 1943, the town was re-taken by Red Army troops.

=== Post World War II period ===
In the 1950s, in the post-war period, the city renewed its industrial and residential construction. In 1952, coal mines, railway maintenance plants, and the large F.E. Dzerzhinsky Dinas Plant were operating here. In 1959, the Krasnoarmeysk Large-Panel Block Plant began operations, and industrial and residential construction began in the city. On December 30, 1962, the city became a city of oblast significance, Krasnoarmeysk.

In 1972, large coal mines operated here (No. 1 "Central", "Krasnolimanskaya", "Rodinskaya", named after G. Dimitrov, named after T. G. Shevchenko, and others). In the 1970s, a dairy plant, a meat processing plant, and the Krasnoarmeyskaya-Zapadnaya No. 1 mine were built. In January 1989, the city's population was 72,900 people. The economy was based on coal mining, electric motor production and refractory materials.

=== Ukrainian independence period ===
In May 1995, the Cabinet of Ministers of Ukraine approved a decision to privatize the Elektrodvigatel plant, Motor Transport Enterprise ATP-11411, ATP-11464, and oil depot located in the city, repair and transport enterprise and district agricultural chemicals. In July 1995, the decision to privatize the Stroydetal plant was approved, bakery and state farm.

=== Russo-Ukrainian War ===
==== War in Donbas ====
During the 2014–2022 War in Donbas, the city was near the frontline with the separatist Donetsk People's Republic.

In May 2015, a decision was made to liquidate the Rodinskaya mine and mine of Georgi Dimitrov. In May 2016, as part of the decommunization policy, the Verkhovna Rada of Ukraine renamed the city to Pokrovsk, and the Krasnoarmeyskaya-Zapadnaya No. 1 mine to Pokrovskaya. The new names for the city and the mine were given by the Holy Nicholas-Pokrovsky Church, built between 2003 and 2006. The new name was honoring the Intercession of the Theotokos known as Pokrova in Ukrainian.

==== Russian invasion of Ukraine ====
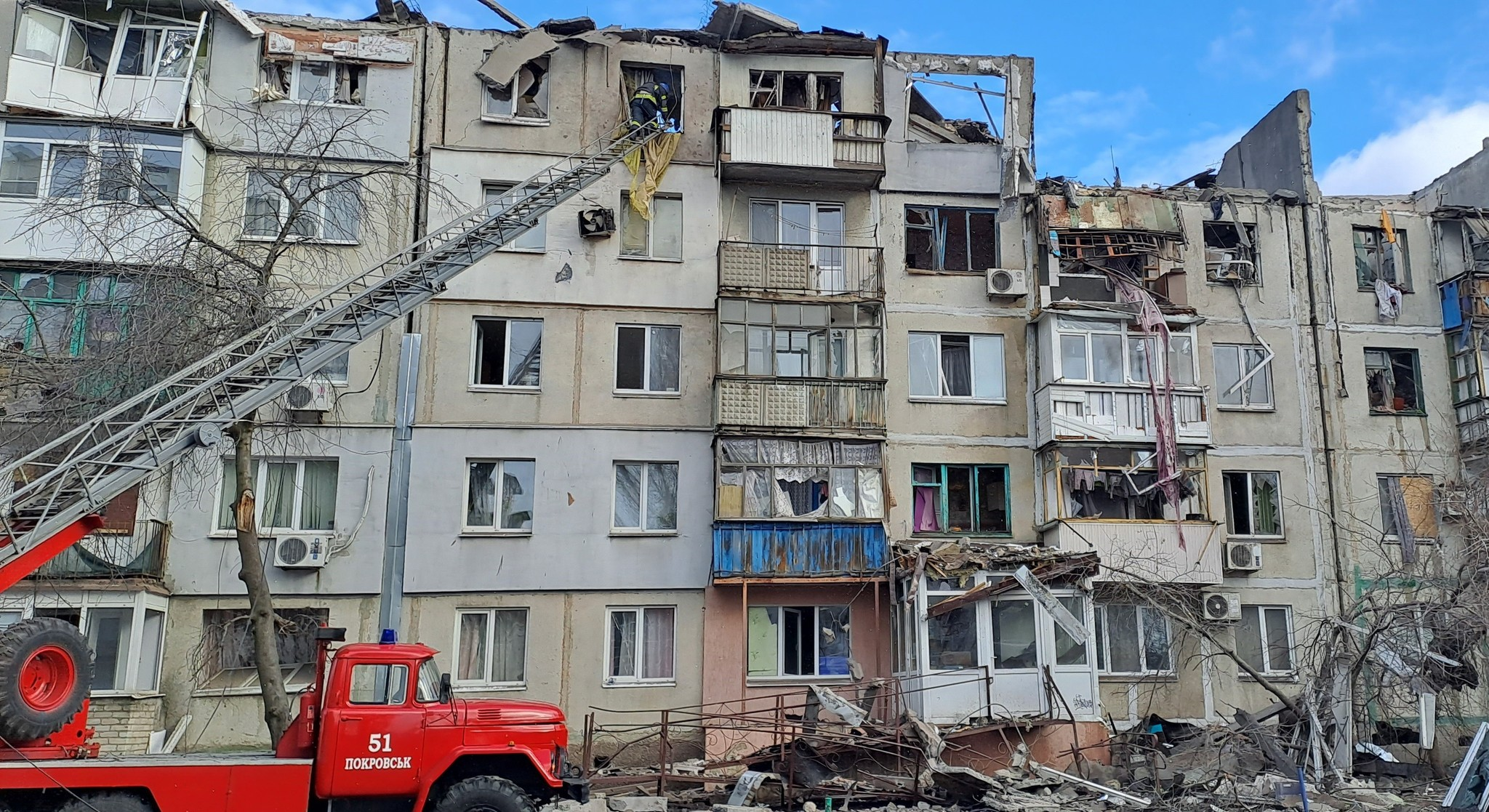
Residential building in Pokrovsk after Russian rocket strike on 15 February 2023

===== 2023 =====
On 7 August 2023 during the Russo-Ukrainian war, Russian missiles struck the city twice, killing nine people.

===== 2024 =====
In July 2024, Russia renewed efforts to reach and capture Pokrovsk in a new offensive. On 15 August, Serhii Dobriak, the head of the Pokrovsk City Military Administration, reported that Russian forces were only 10 km from the city, and urged all citizens, especially the elderly and families with young children, to evacuate. On 19 August, Ukrainian officials announced that families with children living in Pokrovsk and surrounding villages would be forced to leave. The population reportedly had decreased to 36,000 by 1 September. On 5 September, the train station closed for civilian evacuation due to a deteriorating security situation, using buses and the train station in Pavlohrad instead. According to Donetsk Oblast Governor Vadym Filashkin, 26,000 people, including 1,076 children, were still remaining in the city. By October, the population declined to 13,000.

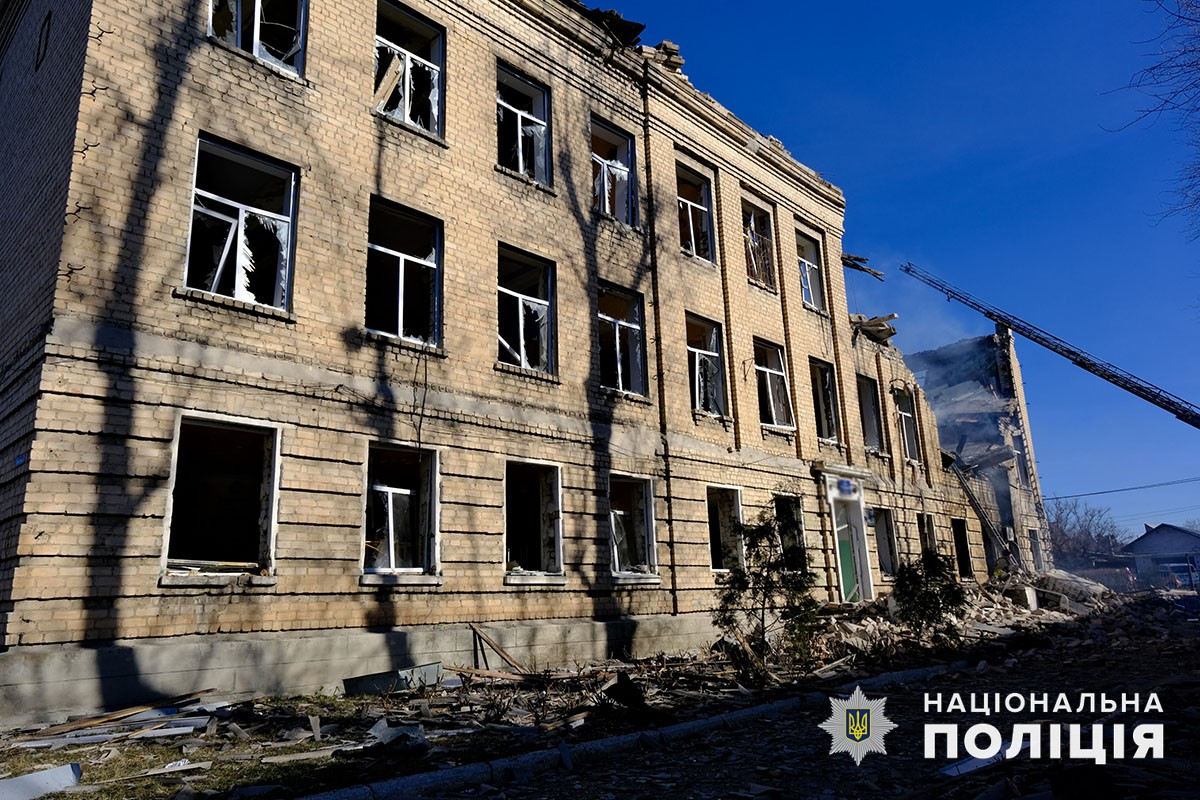
School №3 of Pokrovsk after a Russian missile attack on 28 February 2024

===== 2025 and 2026 =====
By January 2025, after the gradual advances of the Russian military toward the city, its civilian population had declined to around 7,000, the lowest level in two centuries. Continued warfare and evacuations reduced the population to less than 1,500 civilian residents by late July. By early November, military battles were reported inside the city. On 1 December 2025, the Russian Ministry of Defence stated that the city was fully captured by its forces, a claim denied by Ukraine. The Institute for the Study of War determined that Russia captured the city in early 2026.

== Demographics ==
The population of Pokrovsk as of 1 August 2017 was 75,205 people.

According to 2001 census data, the breakdown by ethnicity was:

	Population	Percentage, %
Ukrainian	62,158	75.0
Russian	18,299	22.1
Belarusian	558	0.7
Armenian	307	0.4
Azerbaijani	215	0.3

The population overall is:

Historical population

Year	Pop.	±%
1923	8,203	—
1926	11,335	+38.2%
1939	29,617	+161.3%
1959	47,974	+62.0%
1970	55,044	+14.7%
1979	59,864	+8.8%

Year	Pop.	±%
1989	72,859	+21.7%
2001	69,154	−5.1%
2011	65,447	−5.4%
2022	60,127	−8.1%
2024	13,000	−78.4%
2025	1,500	−88.5%

Native language per 2001 Ukrainian census:

- Russian 59.8%
- Ukrainian 39.4%
- Armenian 0.2%
- Belarusian 0.1%

== Culture ==
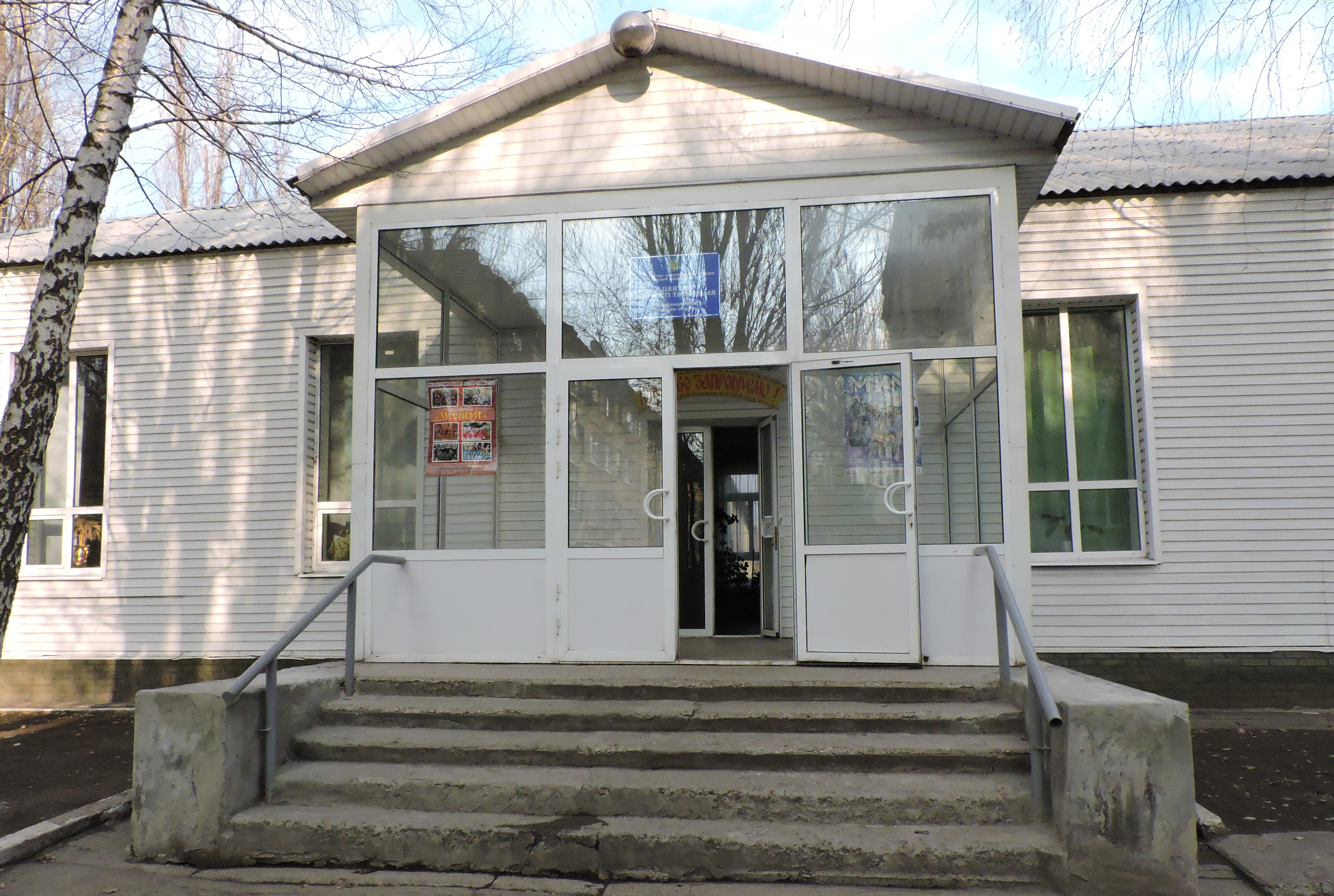
Art and Leisure Center.

- Memorial – mass grave of Soviet soldiers who died during the Great Patriotic War;
- Taras Shevchenko Central City Library;
- Palace of Culture of the Krasnoarmeyskaya-Zapadnaya Mine No. 1;
- Youth Creativity and Leisure Center;
- Komarov Club;
- Pokrovsky Vocational Lyceum;
- Pokrovskaya Central District Hospital;
- Junction Hospital at Pokrovsk Station;
- Pokrovsky Pedagogical College;
- Metallurg Sports Complex;
- Yubileiny Park;
- Monuments to the "Afghans" and "Chernobyl" liquidators and victims (opened in 2011);
- Monument to twice Hero of the Soviet Union Marshal of the USSR Kirill Moskalenko;
- Monument to Vladimir Lenin on Prokofieva Street (opened in 2012, destroyed);
- Monument to Taras Shevchenko (opened in 2019);
- Monument to Nikolay Leontovych in Yubileiny Park (opened in 2018).

The city's welcome stele was destroyed on 2 January 2025 as a result of Russian shelling. A Ukrainian soldier, Pavlo Vyshebaba, took the letter "P" which was thrown on the road, saying that it should become an artifact in a future museum about the Russian-Ukrainian War.

== Economy ==
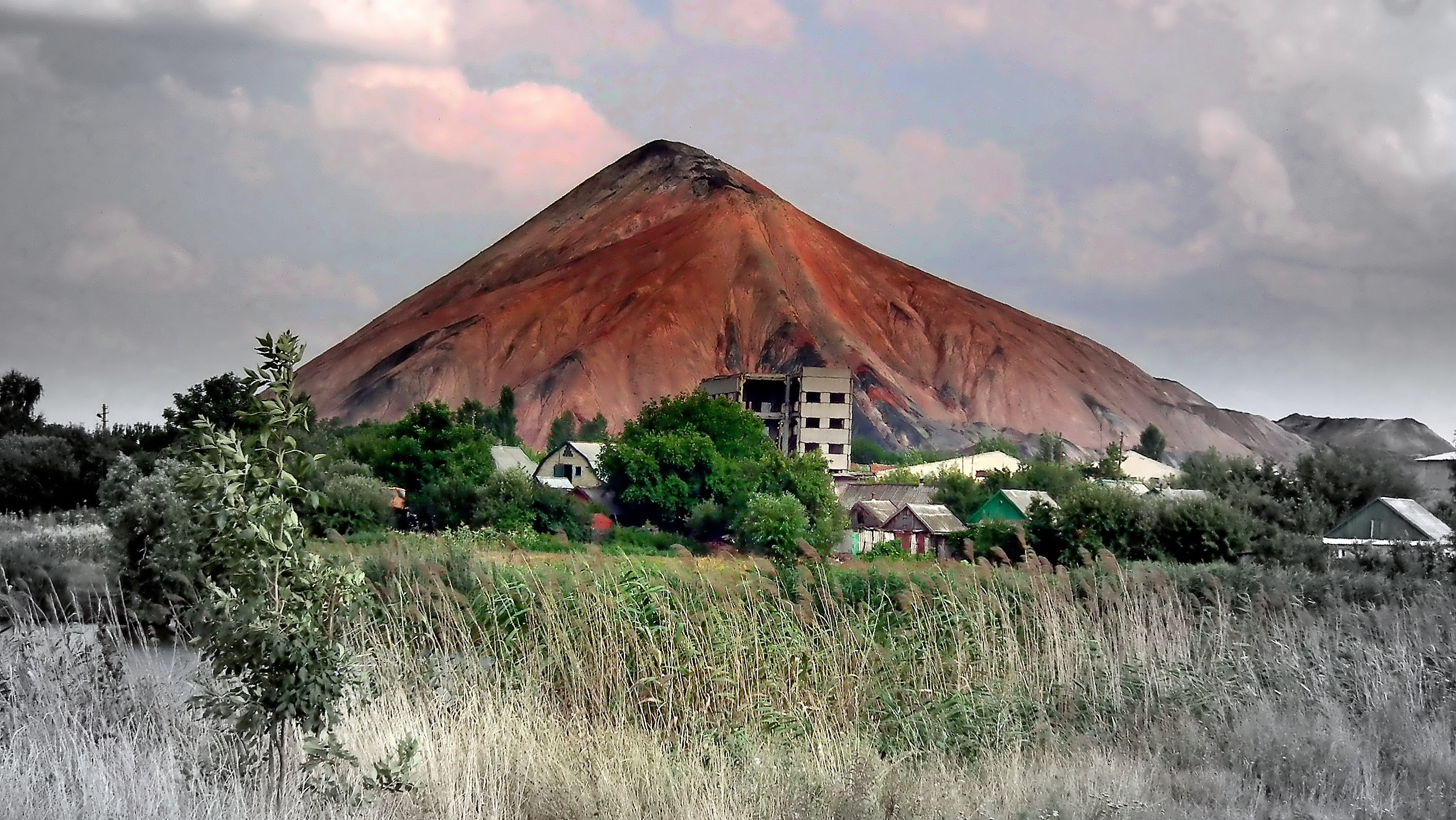
Terricon and mine in the city.

Pokrovsk has central importance for the Ukrainian steel industry. The city is home to 20 enterprises in six main industries. The main coal industry enterprises are the Krasnolimanskaya Mine and PJSC Pokrovskoe Mine Administration (formerly OJSC Krasnoarmeyskaya-Zapadnaya Mine No. 1 Coal Company) — coal production in 2005 was 6,241 thousand tons.

The Pokrovsk Mine Management also operates one of the largest coal mines in Ukraine in the village Udachne. In July 2021, an explosion occurred in the Udachne coal mine, injuring 10 miners in the blast. The affected workers were hospitalized in the Pokrovsk-based Central District Hospital. Because of the war, the site is under constant danger of shelling.

Pischane, besides Pokrovsk Mine Management, is the largest plant for coking coal production in Ukraine. The site provided half of Metinvest's coal volume, used to produce steel at the company's plants. Loss of the Pokrovsk coal mine would thus be a major blow to Ukraine's steel production industry. According to the head of Ukraine's steelmakers' association, Oleksandr Kalenkov, a full closure of the plant could diminish Ukrainian steel production to only 2–3 million metric tons, down from a projected 7.5 million by the end of 2024.

Pokrovsk is known for its industrial enterprises, including the Pokrovsk Machine-Building Plant, Krasnoarmeysk Electrodvigatel Plant, Krasnoarmeysk Silica Plant, Krasnoarmeysk Large-Panel Housing Construction Plant, Krasnoarmeysk Repair and Mechanical Plant, Krasnoarmeysk Foundry and Mechanical Plant, and Donetskstal.

In addition, the city had light industry:

- Krasnoarmeyskaya Sewing Factory
- Carriage Depot (Shmidta Street);
- PJSC Metinvest PokrovskUgol (Metinvest PU; Zashchitnikov Street) Ukraine);
- Business center of Krasnoarmeysk Electromechanical Plant LLC (Yuzhny microdistrict);
- Krasnoarmeysk locomotive depot.

== Education ==
Following the loss of Ukrainian government control over Donetsk in 2014 during the War in Donbas, the Donetsk National Technical University was evacuated to Pokrovsk. On 28 February 2024, the university was partially destroyed by a Russian missile attack.

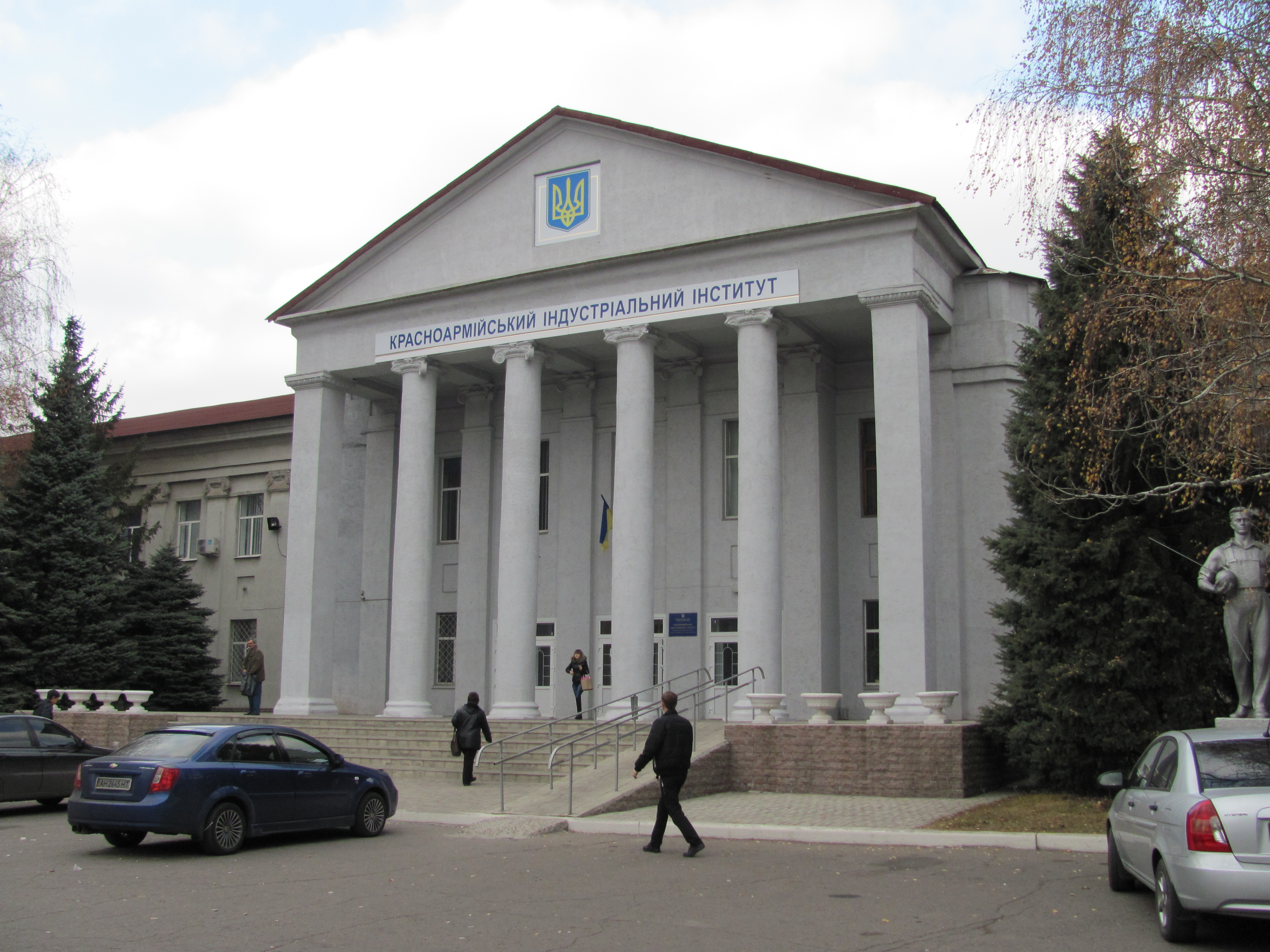
Donetsk National Technical University in Pokrovsk in November 2014

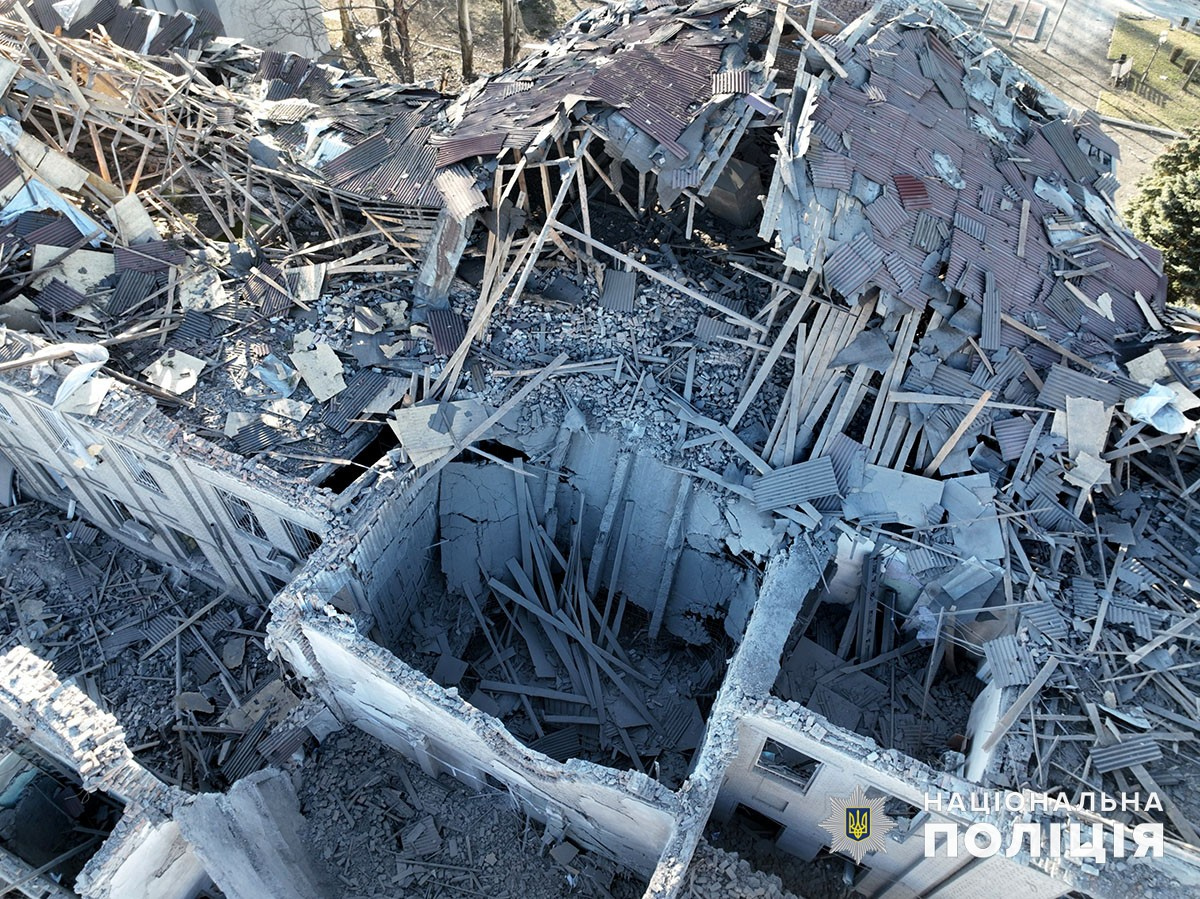
Building in Pokrovsk after a Russian strike

== Gallery ==
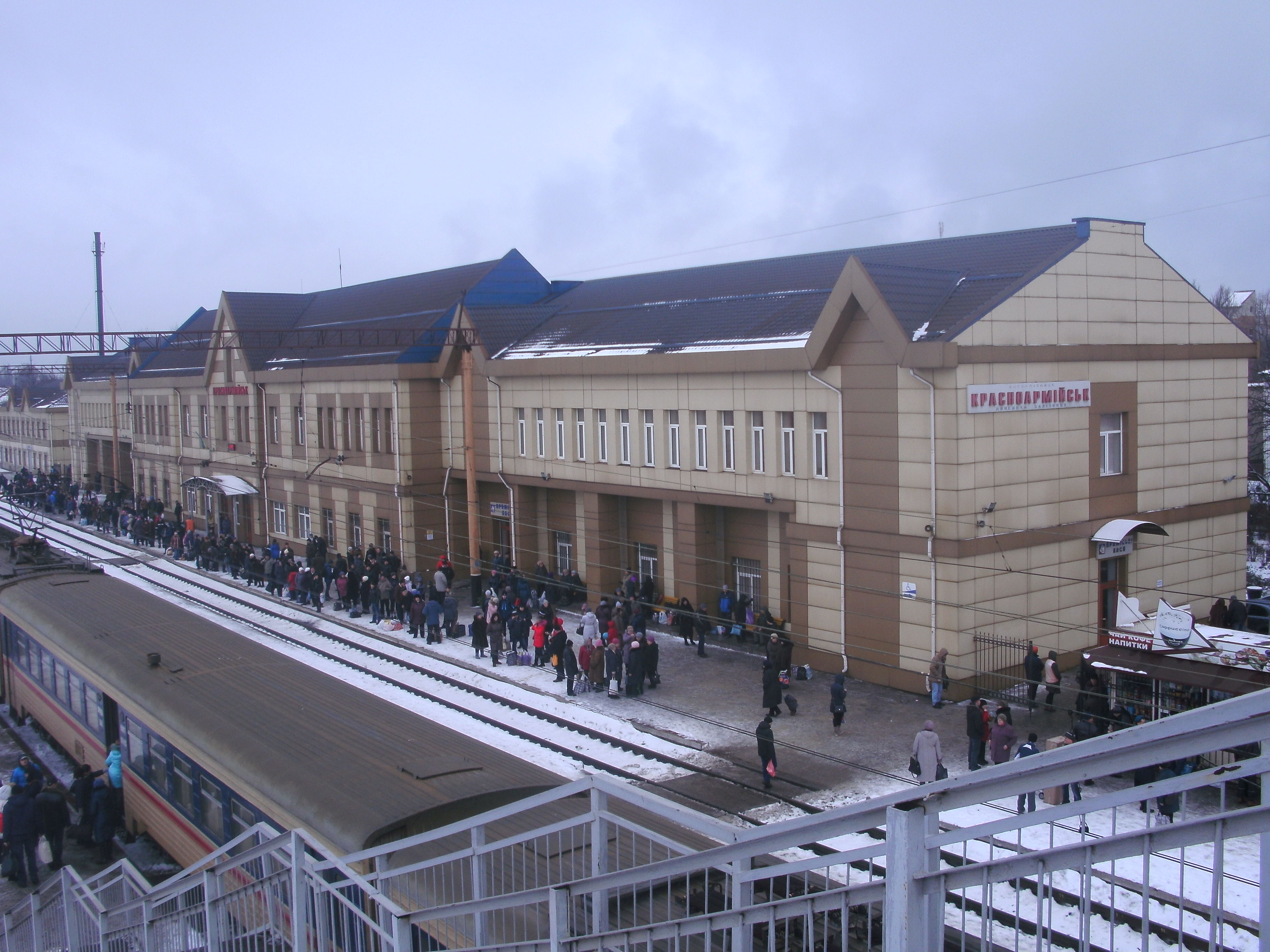
Pokrovsk railway station in 2016

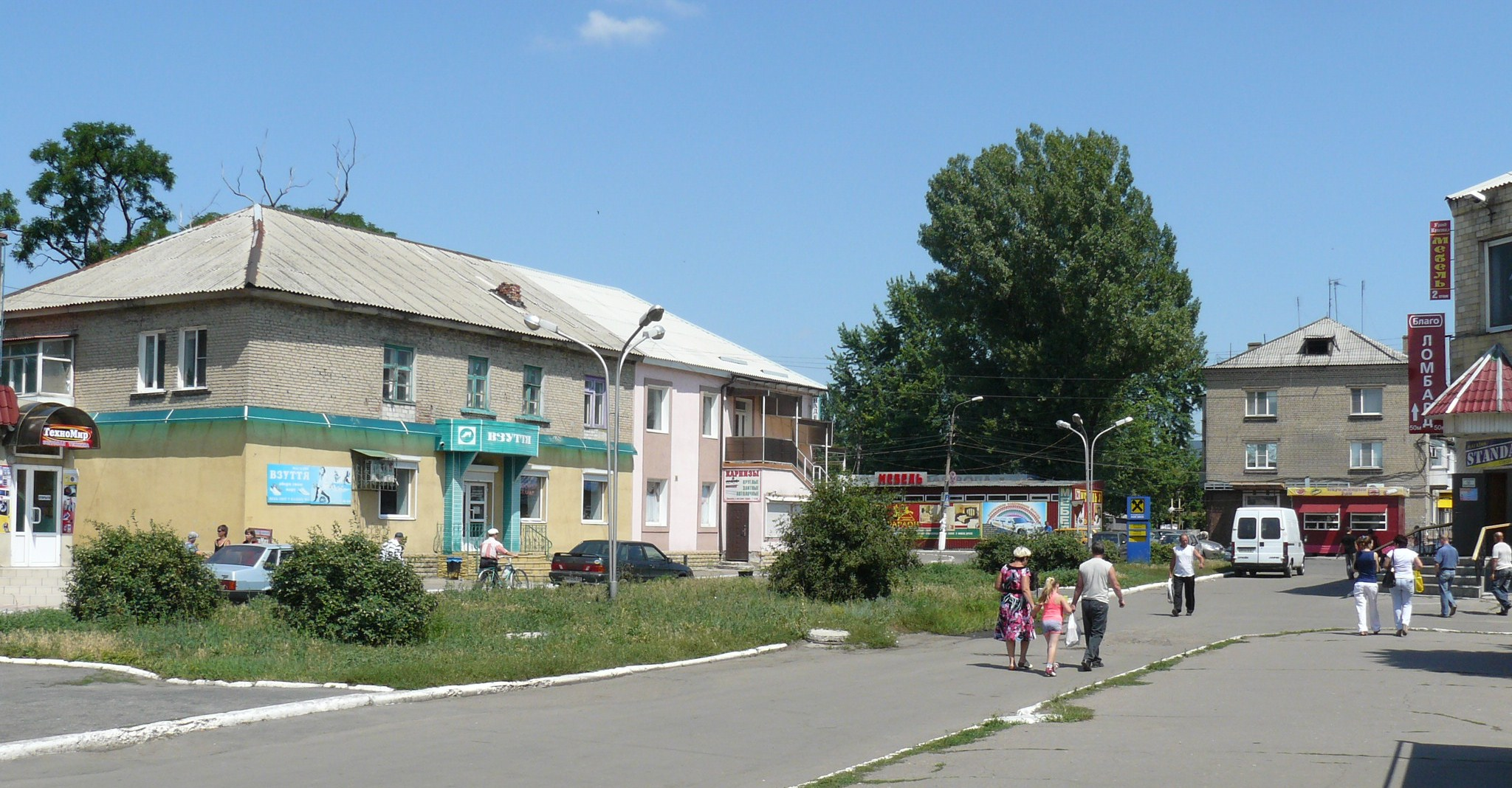
Street in Pokrovsk in 2012

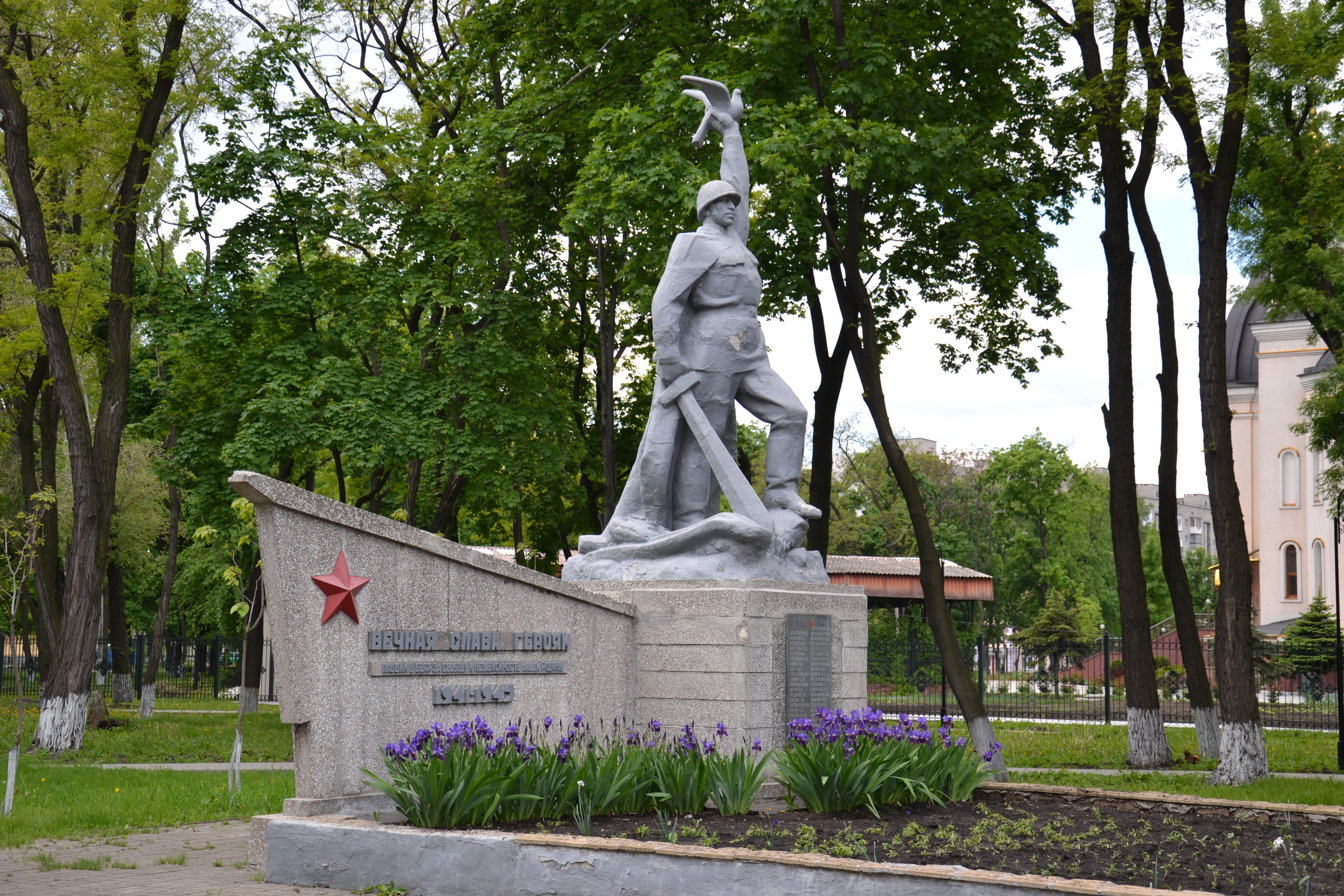
Mass grave of Soviet soldiers who died during World War II, Sobornyi square, Pokrovsk

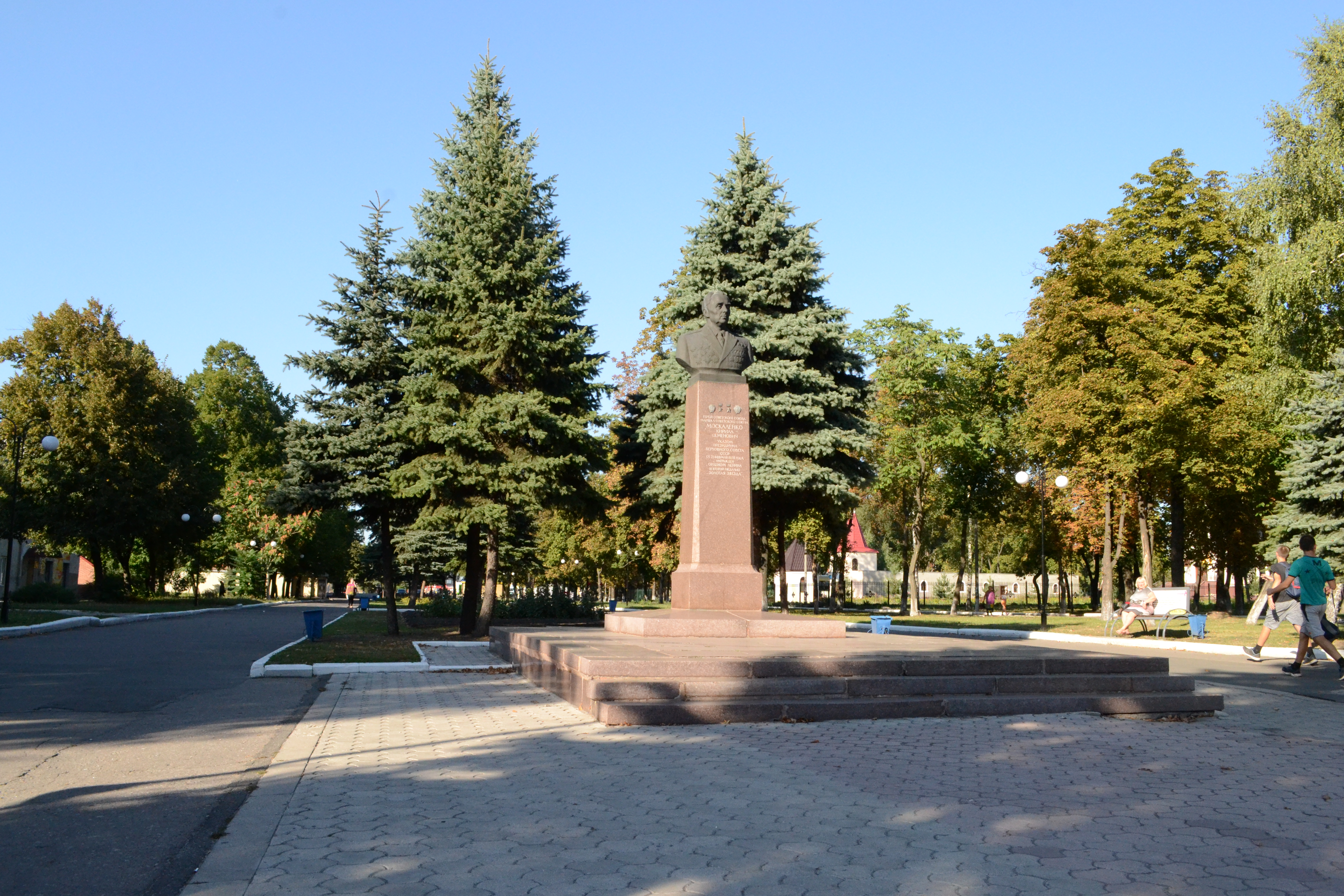
Monument to Ukrainian-born Soviet Marshal Kirill Moskalenko in Pokrovsk, 2017

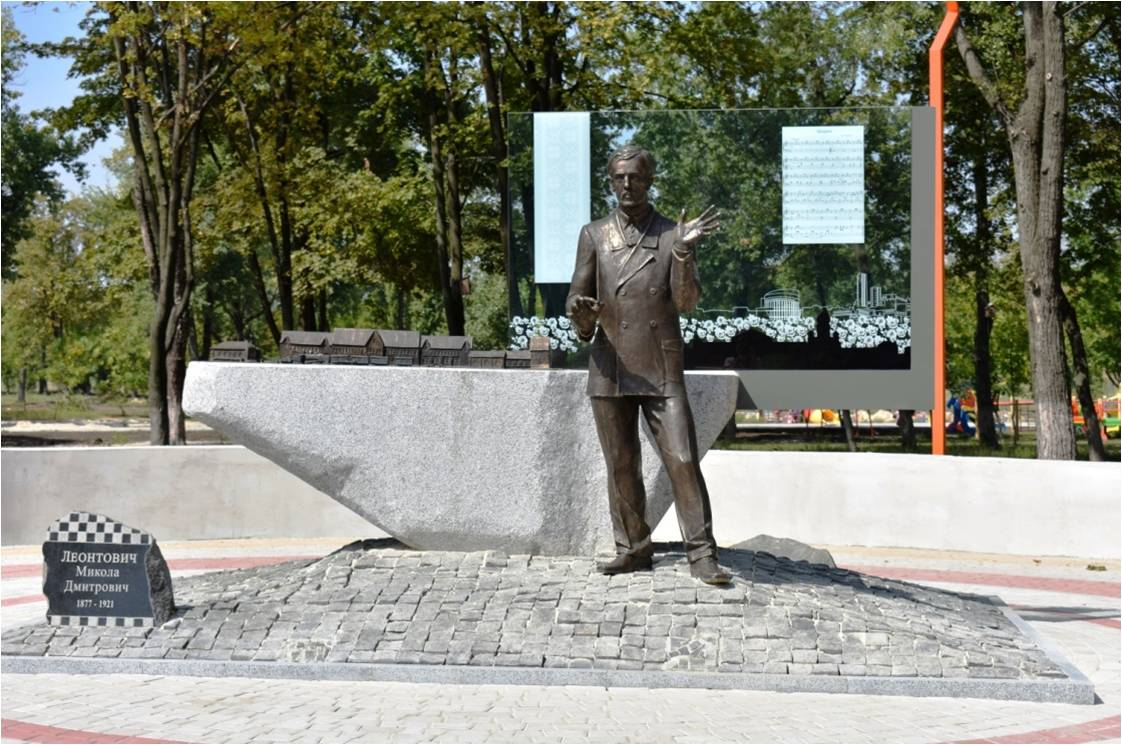
Monument to Nikolay Leontovych, 2018

== Notable people ==
- Volodymyr Kravets (born 1981), Ukrainian boxer
- Valeriy Kurinskyi (1939–2015), Ukrainian scientist, poet and composer
- Kirill Moskalenko (1902–1985), Soviet-Ukrainian Marshal, Hero of the Soviet Union (twice)
- Oleksandr Riabokrys (born 1952), Ukrainian movie director
- Kostiantyn Yelisieiev (born 1970), Ukrainian diplomat and former Ambassador of Ukraine to the European Union under Viktor Yanukovych and Petro Poroshenko

== Bibliography ==
- Cohen, Saul Bernard (1998). The Columbia Gazetteer of the World: H to O. Columbia University Press. p. 1615. ISBN 978-0-231-11040-2.
