= Kharkiv TV Tower =

Kharkiv Television Tower
- Харківська телевежа
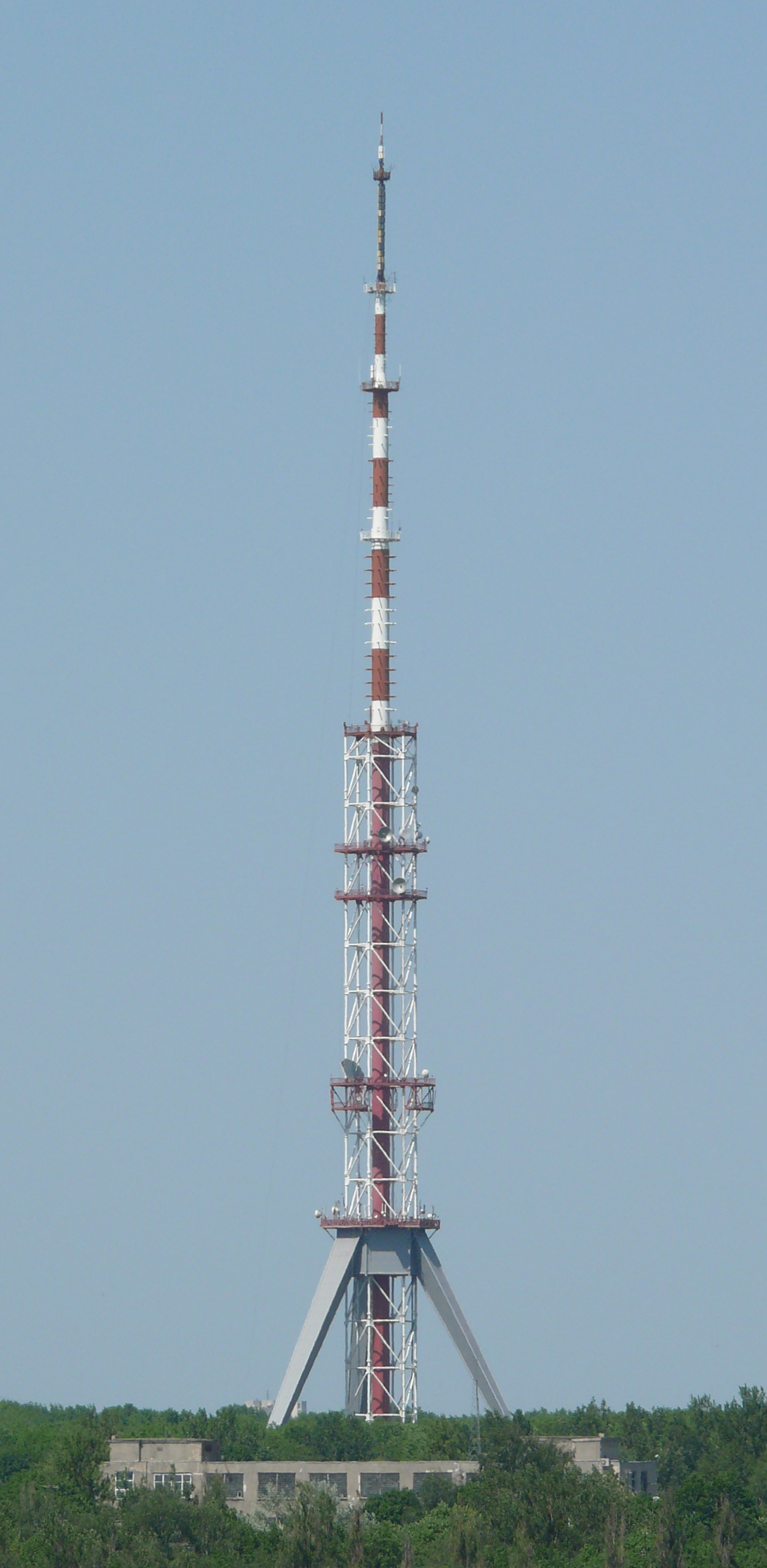
- Kharkiv TV Tower in 2007

- Location within Ukraine
- Alternative names: Kharkov Television Tower

General information
- Status: Destroyed
- Type: Steel lattice television tower
- Location: 1a Derevianko St., Kharkiv, Ukraine
- Coordinates: 50°02′37″N 36°14′07″E
- Completed: 1981
- Opening: 12 December 1981
- Destroyed: 22 April 2024

Height
- Antenna spire: 240.7 m (790 ft)
- Roof: 139.9 m (459 ft)

Technical details
- Material: Steel

Kharkiv Television Tower (Ukrainian: Харківська телевізійна вежа, romanized: Kharkivska televiziina vezha), most commonly known as the Kharkiv TV Tower (Ukrainian: Харківська телевежа, romanized: Kharkivska televezha), is a steel truss television tower for FM-/TV-broadcasting in Kharkiv, Ukraine, which was 240.7-metre-tall (790 ft). It was partially destroyed as a result of a Russian strike during the Russo-Ukrainian War on 22 April 2024 and is planned to be restored only after the end of hostilities.

The tower was of similar design of the Kyiv TV Tower, but its design has legs of a closed metal structure. In addition, the tower was constructed with truss-like space frames, which are lightweight rigid structures constructed from/by interlocking and/or intertwining struts in a geometric pattern. The Kharkiv TV Tower was the tallest building in the city and the fifth tallest TV tower in Ukraine.

== 2022 airstrike ==
During the Battle of Kharkiv, as part of the Russian invasion of Ukraine, on 6 March 2022, the tower and the stations administrative building were struck by eight FAB-500 bombs from a Russian Su-34 fighter jet, the station's administrative building and the tower's self-supporting metal structure sustained heavy damage as a result. The fighter jet was shot down by Ukrainian armed forces right after the bombs were dropped. The pilot ejected, landed and was detained by the National Guard of Ukraine. A year later, the Russian pilot who operated the fighter jet was sentenced to 12 years in prison in Ukraine, and shortly after the verdict, exchanged as a prisoner of war.

== 2024 destruction ==
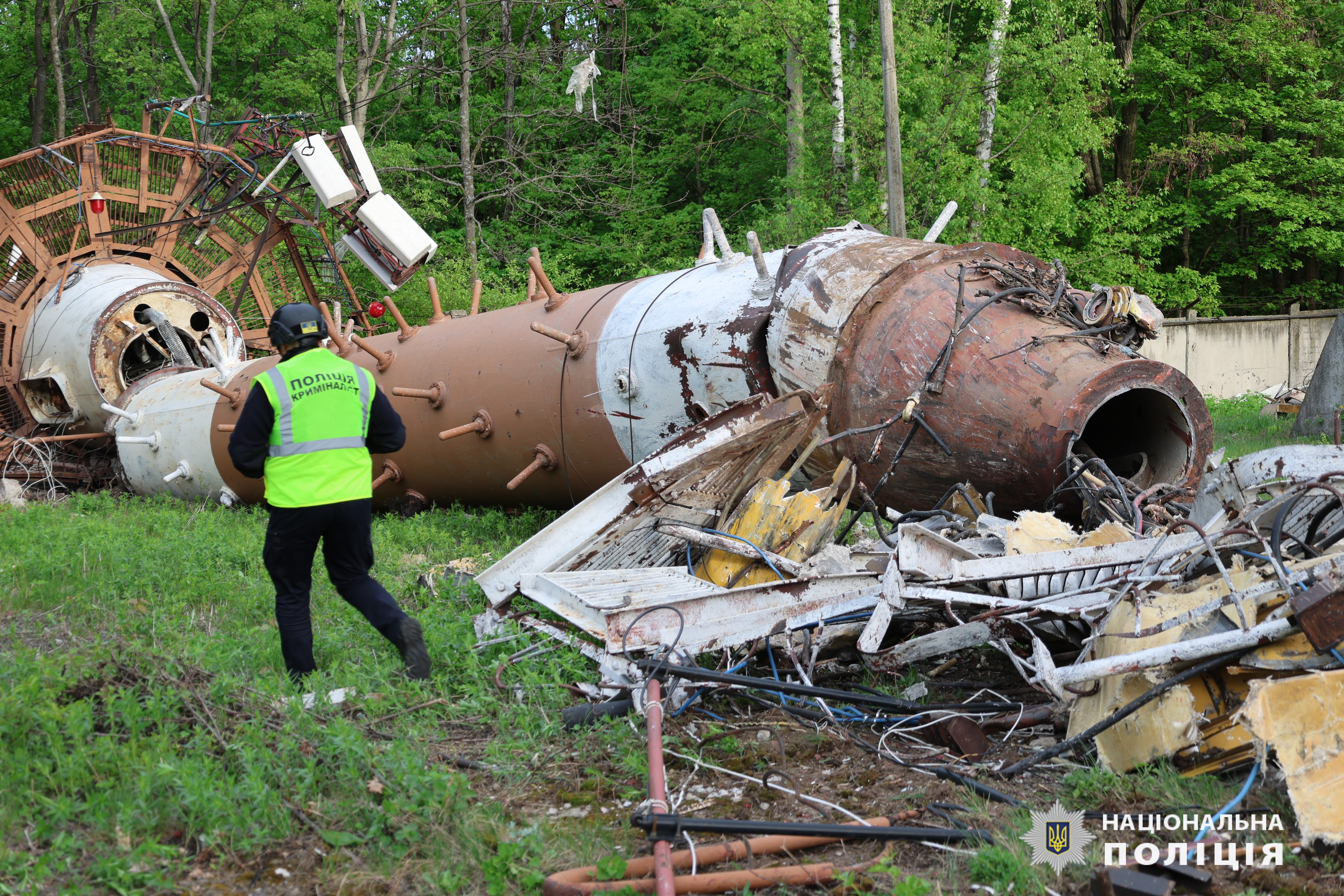
Fragment of the tower after the strike

On 22 April 2024, the upper half of the TV tower was destroyed as a result of a Russian air strike using a Kh-59 cruise missile. The following day there was no signal of digital terrestrial television in Kharkiv and the nearby settlements. Authorities announced that the restoration of the TV tower will begin only after the end of hostilities.

== See also ==
- List of tallest towers in the world
- Kharkiv
