= February 2022 Kharkiv cluster bombing =

Incident during the Russian invasion of Ukraine

- Part of the Bombing of Kharkiv in the battle of Kharkiv during the Russian invasion of Ukraine
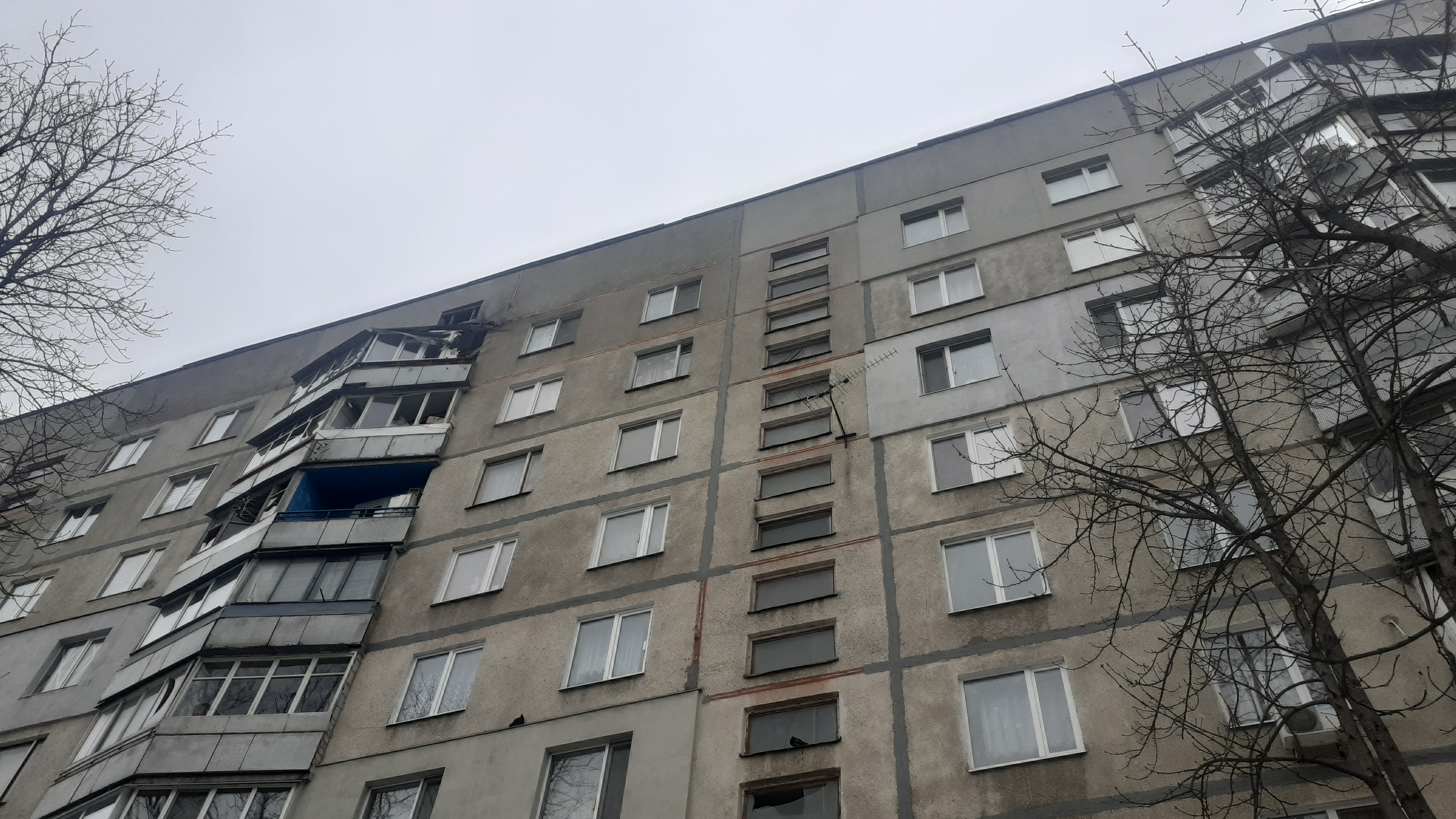
- A damaged building in Kharkiv after the attack
- Location: Kharkiv, Ukraine
- Date: 28 February 2022; 10:00 AM to 2:23 PM
- Target: Ukrainian civilians
- Attack type: cluster munition bombing
- Deaths: 9
- Injuries: 37
- Perpetrator: Russian Armed Forces
- Motive: Unknown

On February 28, 2022, a series of rocket strikes by the Russian Armed Forces killed 9 civilians and wounded 37 more during the battle of Kharkiv, part of the Russian invasion of Ukraine. The Russian Army used cluster munition in the attack. Due to the indiscriminate nature of these weapons used in densely populated areas, Human Rights Watch described these strikes as a possible war crime.

== Attack ==
On February 28, 2022, during the battle of Kharkiv, around 10:00 a.m., the Russian Army fired Grad rockets into three different residential areas in Kharkiv. Nine civilians died. Four people were killed when they left a shelter to get water and go shopping between curfews; a family of two parents and three children were burned alive in their car. The locations hit were residential buildings and a playground, dispersed between Industrialnyi and Shevchenkivskyi District. Explosions in the city were recorded as late as 2:23 p.m.

== Investigations ==
=== Human Rights Watch ===
Human Rights Watch investigated the attack and concluded that the Russian forces used Smerch cluster munition rockets, which disperse dozens of submunitions or bomblets in the air. An international treaty bans cluster munitions because of their widespread damage and danger towards civilians. As there were no military targets within 400 meters of these strikes, and due to the indiscriminate nature of these weapons used in densely populated areas, Human Rights Watch assumes that it could be a possible Russian war crime.

=== Amnesty International ===
Amnesty International found evidence of Russian forces repeatedly using 9N210/9N235 cluster munitions as well as scatterable mines, both of which are subject to international treaty bans - Convention on Cluster Munitions and Ottawa Treaty - because of their indiscriminate effects.

== See also ==
- Russian war crimes
- March 2022 Kharkiv cluster bombing
- April 2022 Kharkiv cluster bombing
