= April 2022 Kharkiv cluster bombing =

Incident during the Russian invasion of Ukraine

Coordinates: 49°57′00″N 36°22′00″E

- Part of the bombing of Kharkiv in the Battle of Kharkiv during the Russian invasion of Ukraine
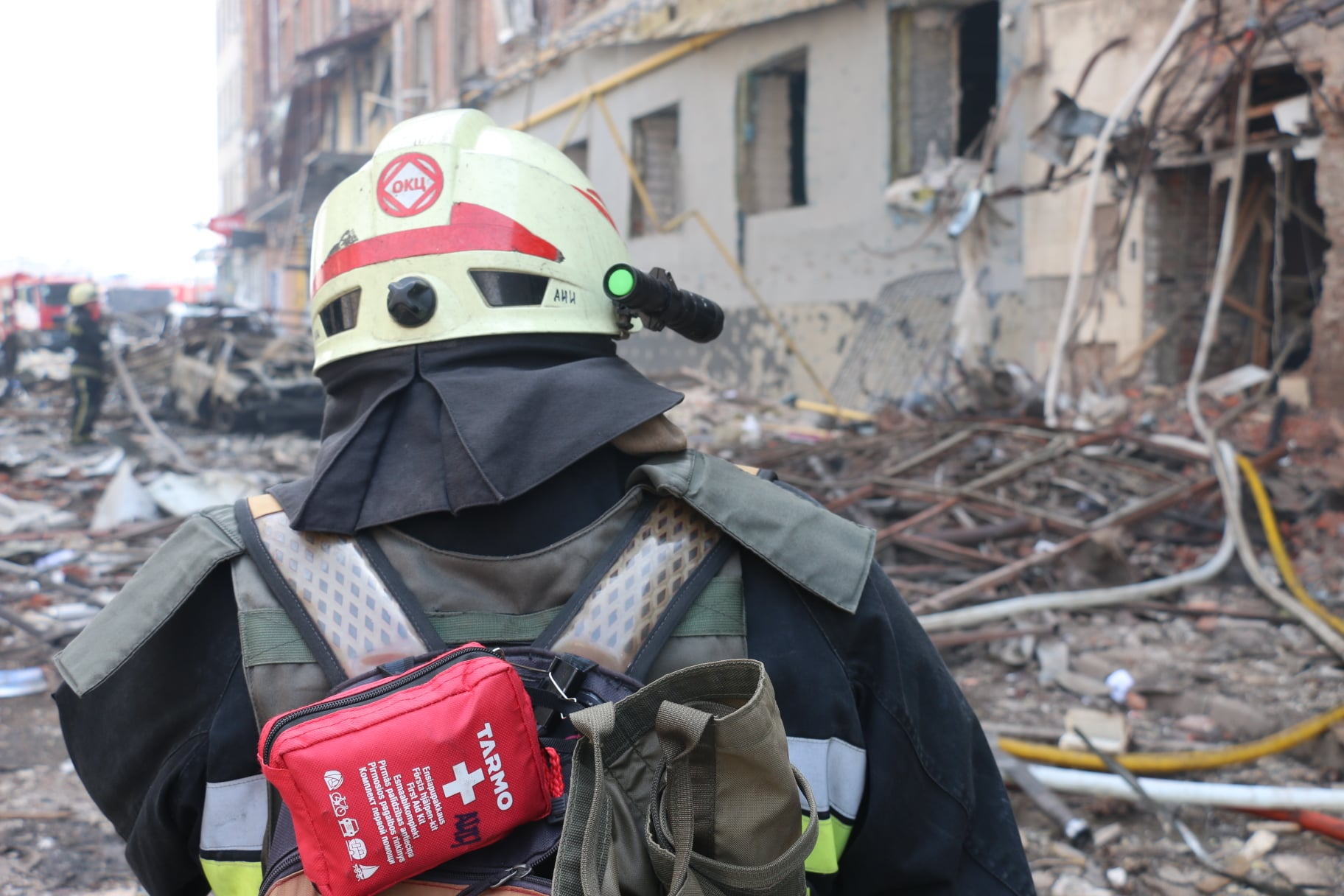
- Kharkiv buildings after the bombing
- Location: Kharkiv, Ukraine
- Date: 15 April 2022
- Attack type: cluster munition bombing
- Deaths: 9
- Injuries: 35
- Perpetrator: Russian Armed Forces

On 15 April 2022, a series of rocket strikes by the Russian Armed Forces killed 9 civilians and wounded 35 more during the battle of Kharkiv, part of the Russian invasion of Ukraine. The Russian Army used 9N210/9N235 cluster munition in the attack. Due to the indiscriminate nature of these weapons when used in densely populated areas, Amnesty International described these strikes as a possible war crime.

== Attack ==
On 15 April 2022 in the afternoon hours, during the battle of Kharkiv, the Russian Army fired 9N210/9N235 cluster bombs into the Industrialnyi District, striking a residential area and a playground on Myru Street. People walking outside fell to the ground to shield themselves from the explosions. Nine civilians died and 35 were injured, including children. The local hospital received wounded people with pieces of steel rod and shrapnel in their limbs. A couple walking through the playground with their 4-year-old daughter when the munitions hit, resulting in the mother being killed when shrapnel ripped through her lungs, spine and abdomen. Another 16-year-old boy died, with the munition leaving a 1-centimetre-wide hole in his chest. On Haribaldi Street, two elderly women died at the entrance of their building. The cluster bombs detonated over an area of 700 square metres.

== Investigations ==
Amnesty International found evidence of Russian forces repeatedly using 9N210/9N235 cluster munitions as well as scatterable mines, both of which are subject to international treaty bans – Convention on Cluster Munitions and Ottawa Treaty. Amnesty International concluded that these indiscriminate attacks, resulting in civilian deaths, are war crimes.

== See also ==
- Russian war crimes
- February 2022 Kharkiv cluster bombing
