= Kharkiv strikes (2022–present) =

Russian missile strikes in Kharkiv, Ukraine

- Part of the Russo-Ukrainian war and the Russian strikes against Ukrainian infrastructure
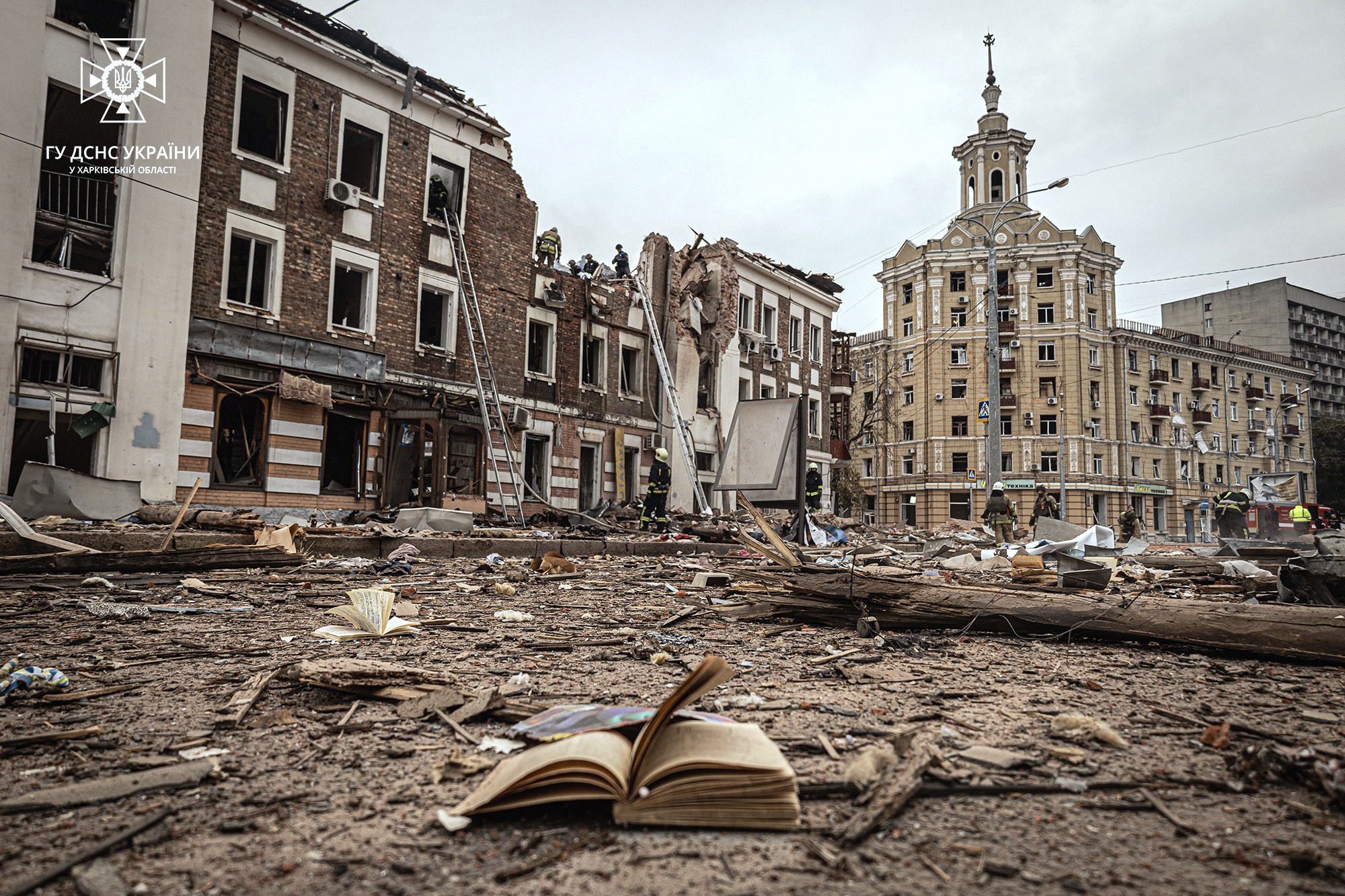
- Destruction in Kharkiv after missile attack on 6 October 2023

- Kharkiv (Ukraine)
- Location: Kharkiv Oblast, Ukraine
- Date: 24 February 2022 – present (4 years, 8 months, 3 weeks and 5 days)
- Attack type: Missile strikes, drone strikes, aerial bombs, artillery
- Deaths: hundreds
- Injuries: thousands
- Perpetrator: Russian Armed Forces

On 24 February 2022, the Armed Forces of Russia have launched an attack in the Battle of Kharkiv, but suffered a defeat and were stopped. Ever since, numerous Russian missile, artillery and drone attacks on Kharkiv, Ukraine were recorded, since the 2022 Russian invasion of Ukraine which marked the beginning of the current phase of the ongoing Russo-Ukrainian war. Kharkiv is the second largest city of Ukraine, some 30 kilometers from Russia's border. Hundreds of people were killed, and massive damage was done to the city.

== 2022 ==
=== February 2022 Kharkiv cluster bombing ===
On 28 February 2022, a series of rocket strikes by the Russian Armed Forces killed nine civilians and wounded 37 more during the battle of Kharkiv. The Russian army used cluster munitions in the attack.

=== Kharkiv government building airstrike ===
Damage after the Russian bombing, 3 March 2022

On 1 March 2022, Russian forces attacked the government administrative building of the Kharkiv Oblast, located in the city of Kharkiv.

=== March 2022 Kharkiv cluster bombing ===
On 24 March 2022, a rocket strike by the Russian Armed Forces killed 6 civilians and wounded 15 more during the battle of Kharkiv, part of the 2022 Russian invasion of Ukraine. The Russian Army used 9N210/9N235 cluster munition and BM-27 Uragan multiple rocket launcher in the attack. Due to the indiscriminate nature of these weapons used in densely populated areas, Amnesty International described these strikes as a possible Russian war crime.

=== April 2022 Kharkiv cluster bombing ===
On 15 April 2022, a series of rocket strikes by the Russian Armed Forces killed nine civilians and wounded 35 more during the battle of Kharkiv, part of the 2022 Russian invasion of Ukraine. The Russian army used 9N210/9N235 cluster munition in the attack. Due to the indiscriminate nature of these weapons when used in densely populated areas, Amnesty International described these strikes as a possible war crime.

=== Kharkiv dormitories missile strike ===
On 17 and 18 August 2022, the missile strike on dormitories in Kharkiv was performed by Russian aviation with a series of missiles. The impact killed 25 people, including an eleven-year-old boy.

== 2023 ==
=== January 2023 ===
On 30 January 2023, a Russian missile strike hit an apartment building, killing one and injuring another three people, damaging the building.

=== October 2023 ===
On 5 October 2023, Russian Forces struck the town of Hroza in the Kupiansk Raion of the Kharkiv Oblast. A Russian Iskander missile struck a grocery store and a cafe during a memorial service for a fallen soldier. The attack killed 59 people, with six injured and three missing, making it one of the deadliest strikes of the war and in the Kharkiv region. Ukrainian President Volodymyr Zelenskyy condemned the attack and said the incident was a deliberate attack on civilians and "no blind strike."

Aftermath of the Russian strike on 29 December 2023

On 21 October 2023, a Russian missile strike hit a postal distribution center, leaving six dead.

=== December 2023 ===
On 30 December 2023, Russian forces attacked the city of Kharkiv with missiles, injuring at least 28 people, including a foreign journalist, and damaging civilian infrastructure.

== 2024 ==
=== January 2024 ===
On 2 January, strikes were conducted on Kharkiv utilizing the Hwasong-11A (KN-23) missiles developed by North Korea.

On 23 January, three strikes on Kharkiv led to nine victims, including a four-year-old child. In the evening in particular, the central Pushkinska Street was hit. In response, on 26 January 2024, the Kharkiv City Council renamed this Pushkinska street to Hryhorii Skovoroda street. On 29 April 2024, the Kharkiv metro station on the street that was also named after Pushkin was renamed to Yaroslava Mudroho station.

=== April 2024 ===
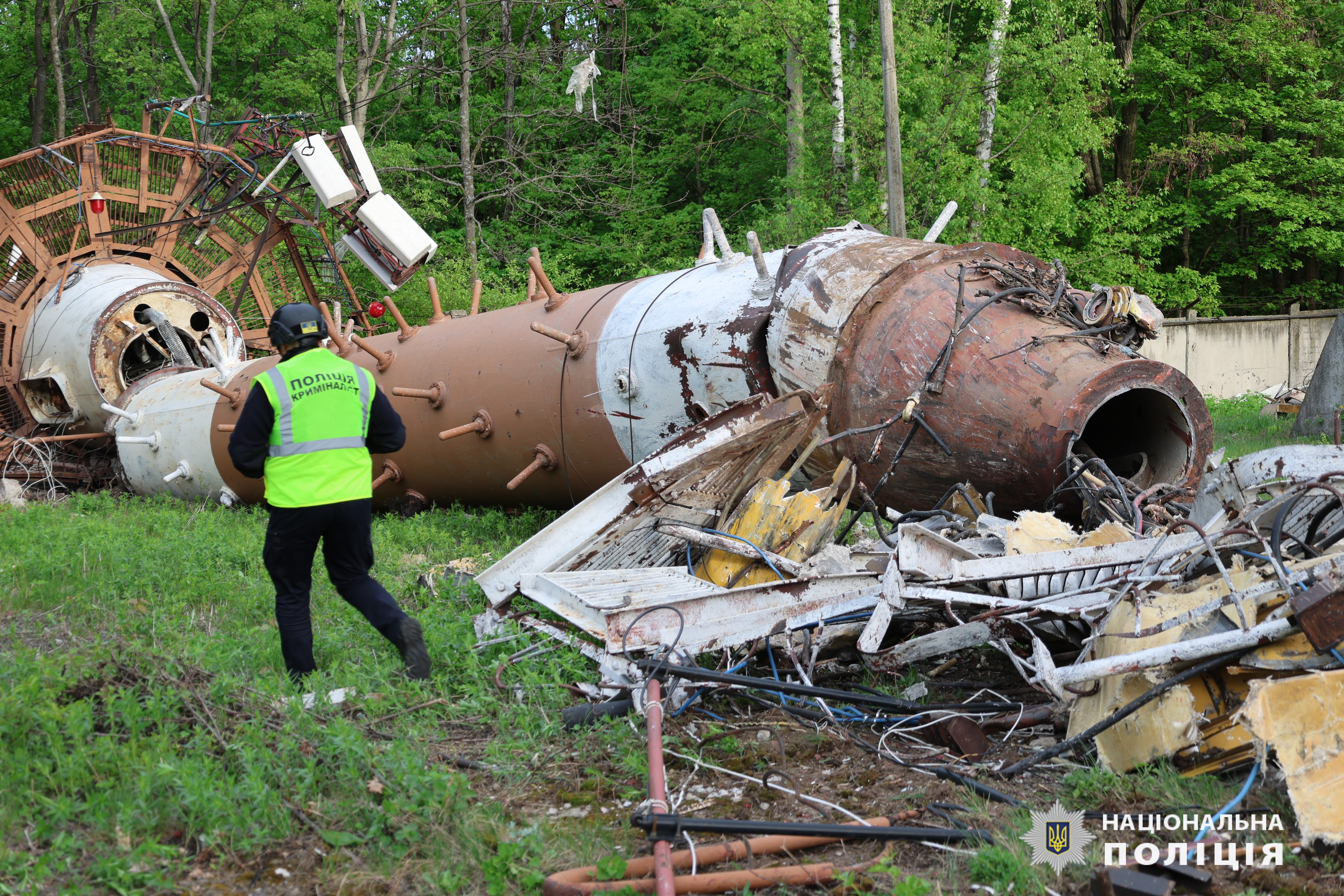
Fragment of the Kharkiv TV Tower after the April 2024 strike

On 22 April 2024, the upper half of the Kharkiv TV Tower was destroyed as a result of a Russian air strike using a Kh-59 cruise missile. The following day there was no signal of digital terrestrial television in Kharkiv and the nearby settlements. Authorities announced that the restoration of the TV tower will begin only after the end of hostilities.

=== May 2024 ===
On 9 and 10 May 2024, the Russians tried to break through the front in Kharkiv while the Ukrainians resisted, starting the 2024 Kharkiv offensive.

On 13 May 2024, the first of a scattering of underground schools in Kharkiv was opened in Industrialnyi District so children could continue their education amidst the Russian attacks on the city.

==== 25 May supermarket strike ====
On 25 May, a Russian strike on a hardware store and a residential area killed 18 and injured 65 others.

=== June 2024 ===
Video of Russian airstrike on Kharkiv in June 2024

On 22 June 2024, Russian forces used four aerial bombs to strike the city, leaving three dead and 52 injured. A five-storey apartment was hit.

=== July 2024 ===
On 13 July, a Russian double-tap strike on the village of Budy killed two and injured 25 others, including two children.

=== August 2024 ===
On 6 August, a Russian missile struck the city center, killing one, and injuring 12 others.

On 30 August, Russian missiles hit an apartment building and playground in the city killing seven people, including a 14-year-old girl. At least a further 77 people were wounded.

=== September 2024 ===
On 15 September, a Russian missile strike hit a 12-story apartment block, killing one person and injuring at least 40.

=== October 2024 ===
On 30 October, a Russian missile hit a nine-story apartment block, killing three people.

== 2025 ==
=== February 2025 ===
On 28 February 2025, Russia fired drones against a medical facility, injuring seven people.

=== March 2025 ===
On 30 March 2025, Russia fired drones against a military hospital, a dormitory hosting refugees and residential buildings. Two people were killed and 35 wounded.

Damaged residential building after Russian strikes, 18 August 2025

=== June 2025 ===
On 11 June 2025, Russia fired drones on buildings and public facilities, killing three individuals and wounding 60 people. The attack included the use of 17 Shahed loitering munitions (i.e., drones). The main areas affected included the Slobidskyi and Osnovianskyi districts.

=== July 2025 ===
On 7 July, Russian drones struck Shevchenkivskyi and Slobidskyi districts, hitting high-rise apartments, a school, and a kindergarten. Twenty-seven civilians were injured, including three children. On 24 July, regional authorities said two glide bombs hit a residential area, killing two people and injuring 33, among them children.

=== August 2025 ===
On 18 August 2025, five Shahed drones struck an apartment complex, causing a hole in the roof and a fire. Seven people were killed.

== 2026 ==
=== January 2026 ===
On 2 January 2026, a Russian double-missile attack hit and destroyed a residential apartment block, killing two civilians and wounding 28. On 5 January 2026, Russian forces launched five missile attacks against the industrial zone of the Slobidskyi District, targeting the energy infrastructure.

=== February 2026 ===
On 21 February, during an evacuation of civilians from Seredniy Burlyk, Kharkiv region, a Russian strike killed two police officers.

=== June 2026 ===
Aftermath of Russian double tap strike on an industrial facility in Kharkiv in the night on 15 June 2026. Five servicemen of State Emergency Service and one employee of Emergency Department of the city were killed

After a Russian drone strike which caused a fire on a building on 15 June 2026, a double-tap strike killed five firefighters extinguishing said fire.

=== September 2026 ===
On 28 September, a Russian aerial bomb hit a Kharkiv apartment building, destroying two floors, injuring 22 people.

=== October 2026 ===
On 21 October 2026, Russian drones killed two people near Kharkiv. On 26 October, a Russian missile and drone strike hit a high-rise apartment block and houses, killing two and injuring 4.

=== November 2026 ===
During the night of 11 November, a missile strike struck a garage complex in the Saltivskyi District, causing a fire. On 14 November 2026, Russian drone strikes attacked residential areas in Derhachi, a city in Kharkiv Oblast, injuring three people. On 18 November, a Russian drone attack struck a market in Zlatopil, injuring 11 people and causing a large fire.

== War crimes ==
Amnesty International found Russia guilty of indiscriminate attacks against Kharkiv, resulting in death or injury to civilians, or damage to civilian objects, constituting war crimes. Due to the indiscriminate nature of Russian cluster munitions used in densely populated areas of Kharkiv, Human Rights Watch described these strikes as a possible war crime.

== See also ==
- Kyiv strikes (2022–present)
- Odesa strikes (2022–present)
