= Dobropilska coal mine =

Mine in Donetsk, Ukraine

Dobropolskaya coal mine
- Interactive map of Dobropolskaya coal mine
- Location: Dobropillia, Donetsk Oblast, Ukraine
- Products: Coal
- Production: 1.25 million
- Opened: 1941
- Company: DTEK Dobropillyavuhillya

The Dobropilska coal mine is in the south-east of Ukraine in Dobropillia, Donetsk Oblast. Built inn 1941, Dobropilska represents one of the largest coal reserves in Ukraine, having estimated reserves of 58.6 million tonnes of coal. The mine produces grade G coking coal concentrate distinguished by its low sulfur content, and prior to the Russian invasion of Ukraine had reached an annual output of approximately 1.25 million tonnes of coal.

The mine is owned by the state enterprise Dobropilliavuhillia-vydobutok, but has been leased to and operated by DTEK Dobropillyavuhillya. It shares a site with DTEK Dobropilska Central Washing Facility, which processes the raw coal output. Since the Russian invasion of Ukraine, the mine has been repeatedly targeted by Russian strikes, causing power outages, gas releases, and flooding. However, the mine has continued to operate despite this. It has been, however, criticised for its significant environmental impact on the surrounding area, including surface subsidence, mineralized water leaking into the Byk river, and atmospheric emissions including methane and small quantities of hazardous substances due to its proximity to residential housing.

== History ==
The mine was first built in 1941. It has an area of 59.2813 hectares. The mine has operated a waste rock dump since 1945. Prior to the Russian invasion of Ukraine, annual coal production from the mine was growing steadily from 0.44 million tonnes per year to 1.25 million tonnes per year during 2016-2021.

=== Russian invasion of Ukraine ===
Since the 2022 Russian invasion of Ukraine, the mine has been the target of frequent shelling by Russian forces, especially after 2025 when the Dobropillia offensive began. By 2024, the mine was continuing to extract coal, but had no buyers, and the energy enterprise Tsentrenergo refused to take it because of the destruction of thermal power plants.

In August 2025, a Russian strike hit the mine, knocking out a substation and cutting power to the facility. Due to this, gas was released, and the mine began to flood. MP Mykhailo Volynets confirmed this later and said that the mine and its longwalls were at a serious risk of being flooded, and would most likely be flooded soon. Another group of Russian forces attacked the mine during late August that year.

== Ownership and profability ==
The mine belongs to the state enterprise "Dobropilliavuhillia-vydobutok". Prior to this, it was under the state holding company DKhK "Dobropilliavuhillia". It has been leased to DTEK Dobropillyavuhillya from the state, operating under a separate subdivision of DTEK named VSP Shakhoupravlinnia Dobropilske. DTEK operates DTEK Dobropilska Central Washing Facility in the region, which is where the mine's raw coal output goes to.

The mine is one of the few profitable coal enterprises in Ukraine, with stable performance indicators as of 2009.

== Environmental impact ==
The mine has had a significant environmental impact on the surrounding areas, causing ongoing surface subsidence and landscape deformation. It also discharges large volumes of mineralized water into the local water network in the area, which has left parts of the Byk river in Donetsk Oblast highly mineralized, with high salinity levels that make it unsuitable for irrigation. In addition, the waste rock that is dumped by the mine is prone to self-ignition and prolonged burning, which has released toxic gases into the area.

Atmospheric emissions from the mine are about 11,457 tonnes per year, of which methane is the majority because the methane extracted during degasification in the mine's lower levels is vented being it is not utilised. Most emissions it releases are not hazardous, except for some small quantities of class 1 substances (such as lead and mercury). This has been a special concern for many years due to the site's proximity to residential housing and agricultural land.

== See also ==
- Coal in Ukraine
- List of mines in Ukraine
