= 2011 Ukraine mine accidents =

Coal mining disasters in Ukraine

Coordinates: 48°20′40″N 39°39′30″E

The 2011 Ukraine mine accidents were two incidents which occurred at two coal mines in Eastern Ukraine on 29 July 2011. The first was an explosion at the Suhodolskaya-Vostochnaya coal mine which killed at least 17 people and left nine missing. The second was an elevator collapse at a mine in the industrial city of Makiyivka, in which at least two miners were killed. The collapse also injured at least three and left 11 missing. The President of Ukraine ordered the government to set up a commission to investigate the accident.

== Suhodolskaya-Vostochnaya explosion ==
Shortly before 2 a.m. on 29 July 2011, an explosion went off in the Suhodolskaya-Vostochnaya coal mine, which occurred 3,000 feet (910 meters) underground. The explosion killed at least 17 people and left nine missing. Investigators suspect the accident was caused by a powerful explosion of methane. Mykhailo Volynets, the head of the Independent Trade Union of Miners, called the Suhodolskaya-Vostochnaya mine "one of the most dangerous in Ukraine" due to buildups of methane and coal dust. The President of Ukraine Viktor Yanukovich and Prime Minister Mykola Azarov planned to fly to the accident site.

== Makiivka elevator collapse ==
A short time after the explosion, an elevator collapsed at the Bazhanova Coal Mine in the industrial city of Makiivka. At least two miners were killed, at least three were injured and 11 were left missing. Hundreds of other workers laboring at a different section of the mine were trying to leave through emergency exits and pathways, said Emergency Situations Ministry spokeswoman Yulia Yershova.
