= Bilorichenska coal mine =

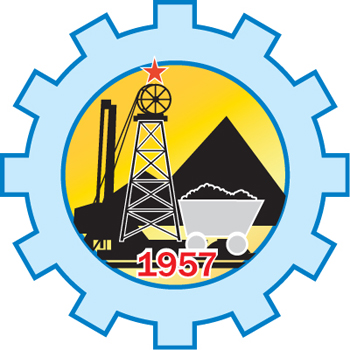
- Location: Luhansk, Ukraine
- Products: Coal
- Greatest depth: 720 m (2,360 ft)
- Opened: 1957
- Company: Government of Ukraine
- Website: http://shahta.com.ua

The Bilorichenska coal mine (Ukrainian: Шахта "Білоріченська") is a coal mine located in Belorechenskiy, Luhansk Raion of Luhansk region, Ukraine. As of June 1, 2011, the confirmed reserves of the mine were reported to be 11.6 million tons.

== History ==
The designing and engineering of the mine began in 1949. The mine is nicknamed "Bilorichenska" after the Belaya River. The mine was placed in a region where "a burning stone" was found in chalk deposits in the 18th century. Construction of the shaft began in December 1950, with the surface structures following in September of the next year. The mine was commissioned and opened in 1957.

From 1960 to 1970, the miners of Bilorichenska won several all-union socialist competitions. In 1975, the mine produced approximately 670,000 tons of coal, continuing at this production rate for the following 15 years.

After the collapse of the Soviet Union, production decreased rapidly due to a lack of investments and technology. By 1996, coal production amounted to only 193 thousand tons. By this time, all the coal reserves of the coal beds Almaznyi and Kamenskiy series had been exhausted. In September 2002, a new shaft commenced operation, equipped with a 3RD-90 heavy-duty complex.

During the following seven years, a series of faces along the L6 bed 725 meters horizon were put into production, namely: the original eastern, 5th western, 2nd eastern, 2nd western, 6th western, 5th bis western, 3rd western and 1st bis eastern. Each face was equipped with heavy-duty complexes and machines. In 2010, coal production at Bilorichenska amounted to 1.182 million tons. In 2011, one more face was put into production, the 7th western. Its production amounted to more than 100 thousand tons of coal per month.

Russian occupation head of the oblast Leonid Pasechnik stated that on 6 April 2026, Ukraine struck the mine, damaging a power substation and trapping workers underground, and that steps were being taken to rescue the workers.

== Ownership ==
After the collapse of the Soviet Union, the mine belonged to the state-owned Luhanskvuhillya coal mining group. In 2001, the mine declared insolvency and the recapitalization process started. In 2002, the mine obtained a strategic partner, Valentin-Invest, a holding company of Ukrainian businessman Igor Martynenkov, who obtained the majority stake in the mine while the state-owned shares decreased to 25.83%. The recapitalization plan was approved by the court in 2007. This decision was annulled by the High Commercial Court of Ukraine in 2010.

In 2012, the court decided to return the mine to state ownership. On 14 September 2012, the Ukrainian state took control of the mine by force. Some media sources link this action to the participation of Igor Martynenkov at the parliamentary election against the candidate of the Party of Regions. In 2014, pro-Russian separatists captured multiple towns in Luhansk Oblast, including Bilorichenskyi and the mine itself, annexing it into the pro-Russian, self-declared Lugansk People's Republic. Following the highly disputed 2022 annexation referendums in Russian-occupied Ukraine, Russia claimed the city and the mine as part of its territory. In 2024, former Ukrainian Minister of Revenue Oleksandr Klymenko, who had fled to Russia in 2014, folded the seized mine into his holding company, Rodina Industrial Group, leasing it from an LNR official. Later in 2025, the Russian state-owned Promsvyazbank (PSB) announced a commitment of 1.1 billion rubles in a modernisation loan at a preferential rate specific to occupied territories.

== Production safety ==
At the mine territory, a rescue workers school was built, which later became the basis for the only mine rescue station in Ukraine. To reduce the danger of fire in the mine, the mine purchased 14 units of YUREK-6, which were used to equip the main and local conveyor lines with fire-fighting systems in 2004.

== See also ==
- Coal in Ukraine
- List of mines in Ukraine
