= Krasnolymanska coal mine =

Mine in Rodynske, Donetsk Oblast, Ukraine

- Interactive map of Krasnolymanska coal mine
- Location: Rodynske, Donetsk Oblast, Ukraine
- Products: Coal
- Production: 3,560,000
- Opened: 1959

The Krasnolymanska coal mine (Ukrainian: Шахта «Краснолиманська») is a large coal mine located in the south-east of Ukraine in Donetsk Oblast. Krasnolymanska represents one of the largest coal reserves in Ukraine having estimated reserves of 85.1 million tonnes. The annual coal production is around 3.56 million tonnes.

Coal from the mine is primarily used in the metallurgical sector.

== History ==
Prior to Euromaidan, the mine was controlled by associates of former Ukrainian President Viktor Yanukovych. Following the outbreak of the War in the Donbas, the mine passed through a series of ownership changes, but remained in firm Ukrainian control and was not taken over by the pro-Russian, self-declared Donetsk People's Republic. In November 2015, it was first reported that the director of the state enterprise, that the mine was under - DP Vuhilna Kompaniya Krasnolymanska - had organised the illegal extraction of coal without the required permits, causing severe environmental damage, and had arranged the sale of coal to a private intermediary at prices three times below the market value. By 2017, it came under the ownership of businessman Vitaliy Kropachov through his company TOV Krasnolymanske, which is part of the Ukrdoninvest group. Through this agreement, TOV held the extraction rights and controlled the actual mine, while the state enterprise DP Vuhilna Kompaniya Krasnolymanska directed all financial and economic activity for the mine and then funnelled it into TOV. However, soon after this acquisition, the state enterprise DP Vuhilna Kompaniya Krasnolymanska fell into severe financial difficulties related to the activities of the former director.

The financial collapse of the state enterprise led to wage arrears to workers exceeding 100 million hryvnias, and the Ministry of Energy had to develop a five-year recovery programme, announcing more state support from July 2021. In March 2025, a court opened bankruptcy proceedings against the mine's owner, TOV Krasnolymanske. In 2025, it was reported by Russian-backed sources that Ukrainian forces had partially damaged the mine's industrial infanstructure during the time when Russian forces briefly had full control over the city of Rodynske, although so far this has never been confirmed by any independent sources and remains alleged.

== See also ==
- Coal in Ukraine
- List of mines in Ukraine
