= Almazna coal mine =

Coal mine in Ukraine

Coordinates: 48.468889°N 37.082778°E

- Interactive map of Almazna coal mine
- Location: Dobropillia, Donetsk Oblast, Ukraine
- Products: Coal
- Production: 712,000
- Opened: 1990
- Company: Dobropillyavuhillya

The Almazna coal mine is a large coal mine located in the south-east of Ukraine in Donetsk Oblast. Almazna represents one of the largest coal reserves in Ukraine, having estimated reserves of 73.1 million tonnes of coal. Its annual coal production is around 712,000 tonnes. As of 2001, the mine has a total employment of 2,447 personnel, including 1,656 underground miners. The mine operates three vertical shafts, each to a depth of 107 m.

Almazna Mine State Open Joint Stock Company was formed in 1996 through the shareholding of RSCHA Mine. In 1997, the mine was renamed Almazna mine. The mine is a subsidiary of DHC "Dobropillyavugillya" and in fact remains a state-owned enterprise.

== History ==
In 1892, the mine started mining hard coal. In 1900, two artisanal mines were opened, named Yerastovo coal mines. In 1910, a joint-stock company was established. By 1930, the mine was producing 1300 tons of coal per day. In 1953, the town of Dobropillia was established on the basis of the mining villages.

In 2023, the mine introduced a new coal longwall of the L1 coal seam. The longwall contains over 900,000 tons of coal and has a seam thickness of 1.35 meters, and planswere made to extract the coal during 2023-2024. The Ministry of Energy under Herman Halushchenko supported the commissioning of the longwall for its use towards energy security during the Russo-Ukrainian War.

== Production dynamics ==
Actual production in 2001 amounted to 2500–2700 tons per day. In 2003, 804 thousand tons of coal were mined. In 2014 — 585 thousand tons. In 2015 — 1 million tons.

== See also ==
- Coal in Ukraine
- List of mines in Ukraine
