= Vinnytska coal mine =

Coal mine in Donetsk, Ukraine

- Location: Stizhkivske, Donetsk Oblast, Ukraine
- Products: Coal
- Production: 303,000
- Opened: 1957

The Vinnytska coal mine (Ukrainian: Шахта «Вінницька») is a large coal mine located in the south-east of Ukraine in Donetsk Oblast. Vinnytska represents one of the largest coal reserves in Ukraine having estimated reserves of 14.7 million tonnes. The annual coal production is around 303,000 tonnes.

The mine was originally under the State Holding Company (DHK) "Shakhtarskantratsyt" until 2003, when it became its own subsidiary under DP "Mine Vinnytska". However, in 2006, the subsidiary was liquidated, and coal extraction ceased at the mine. However, it started up again soon, as it was at least included on a privatisation list in 2008. In 2014, the mine was captured by pro-Russian separatists, who annexed it into the pro-Russian, self-declared Donetsk People's Republic.

== History ==
Following the collapse of the Soviet Union, the mine operated as a subsidiary of DVAT "Shakht Vinnytska", which was part of the State Holding Company (DHK) "Shakhtarskantratsyt". In March 2003, all of the subsidiaries of DHK Shakhtarskantratsyt" were separated, making Vinnytska a distinct entity. The process was formalized in October 2005 by the Ministry of Fuel and Energy of Ukraine, creating DP "Mine Vinnytska". At the time, D.I. Kobzar was its acting director. However, just a year later, the subsidiary was liquidated and coal extraction from the mine was ceased on 30 June 2006, with DP "Donetskuhlerestrukturyzatsiya" being responsible for the physical liquidation works. Despite the liquidation order, the mine continued to work, and by 2008, it appeared on a list by the government for privatisation in 2009.

In 2014, pro-Russian separatists seized the town and the mine and annexed it into the pro-Russian, self-declared Donetsk People's Republic. Following this, on 28 November, the Ministry of Energy ordered the cessation of all financial activities for enterprises located in the ATO zone, which included the mine.

== See also ==
- Coal in Ukraine
- List of mines in Ukraine
