= Molodohvardiiska coal mine =

Coal mine in Luhansk, Ukraine

- Location: Molodogvardeysk, Luhansk, Ukraine
- Products: Coal
- Production: 712,000
- Opened: 1971
- Company: Krasnodonvugillya

The Molodohvardiiska coal mine (Ukrainian: Шахта «Молодогвардійська») is a large coal mine located in the southeast of Ukraine in Luhansk Oblast. Molodohvardiiska represents one of the largest coal reserves in Ukraine having estimated reserves of 63.6 million tonnes. The annual coal production is around 712,000 tonnes. It is owned by the state enterprise Krasnodonvugillya.

== History ==
Following the outbreak of the War in the Donbas, pro-Russian separatists seized control of the city and the mine and annexed it into the pro-Russian, self-declared Luhansk People's Republic. Under the occupation authorities, it was incorporated into the state unitary enterprise Vostokvuhol. Shortly afterwards, in June 2014, a fire broke out at the mine trapping seven workers, but there were no casualties.

In September 2021, a new longwall was commissioned at the mine at the 617-metre horizon by the occupation authorities, with industrial reserves of around 300,000 tonnes of grade Zh coal. In October 2021, another fire broke out at the mine, from which 141 miners were evacuated, but it was quickly extinguished. By April 2024, the mine was among ten coal enterprises on occupied Luhansk Oblast territory transferred to Russian investors for a low sum. Wage arrears that had accumulated over the years were not addressed by the new Russian owners. By August 2025, the mine was reported to be under the threat of liquidation, with the investor attempting to reutrn the mine back to the government while refusing to take on any debts. By September 2025, it was confirmed through the LPR that the new owners would not be restoring the mine, as was agreed upon, citing problems with electricity supply and other factors.

== See also ==
- Coal in Ukraine
- List of mines in Ukraine
