= Hirske coal mine =

Coal mine in Luhansk, Ukraine

- Location: Hirske, Luhansk, Ukraine
- Products: Coal
- Production: 320,000
- Opened: 1898
- Company: Pervomaiskvuhillia

The Hirske coal mine (Ukrainian: Шахта «Гірська») is a large coal mine located in the south-east of Ukraine in Hirske, Luhansk Oblast. Hirske represents one of the largest coal reserves in Ukraine having estimated reserves of 46.5 million tonnes. The annual coal production is around 320,000 tonnes, and is a subsidiary of the state enterprise "Pervomaiskvuhillia" (Первомайськвугілля).

Coal is extracted from the K8 and M3 seams at depths reaching 1,000 metres.

== History ==
The mine was founded in 1898, making it one of the oldest coal mines in modern-day Ukraine. It was rebuilt after World War II in 1949 following its destruction. As of 2018, it was one of the only operating mines that were among Ukraine's oldest. As of 2018, there was one active working force at the K8 seam, with reserves of 400,000 tonnes and a daily output of 400 tonnes. A fourth northern longwall was being prepared, with a total amount of reserves of 1.7 million tonnes.

However, the mine faced serious financial difficulties prior to the Russian invasion of Ukraine. By mid-2019, wage arrears started accumulating due to unsold coal stockpiles, due to the War in the Donbas as the mine remained close to the frontlines. This resulted in numerous miners at the mine protesting. Furthermore, in August 2019, flooding began at the 1,000-metre horizon. By June 2021, the mine was disconnected from electricity due to the accumulation of debts of 1.5 billion hryvnias across energy state enterprises in the oblast, which led to serious worries of flooding. A regional emergency commission was created at the time to address further flooding.

== 1980 mining disaster ==
In 1980, 66 miners and two rescue workers died in an accident at the Hirske mine.

== See also ==
- Coal in Ukraine
- List of mines in Ukraine
