= Kholodna Balka coal mine =

Coal mine in Donetsk, Ukraine

Coordinates: 48.00183928°N 38.05221938°E

- Interactive map of Kholodna Balka coal mine
- Location: Makiivka, Donetsk Oblast, Ukraine
- Products: Coal
- Production: 523,000
- Opened: 1957

The Kholodna Balka coal mine (Ukrainian: Шахта «Холодна балка») is a large coal mine located in the south-east of Ukraine in Donetsk Oblast. Kholodna Balka represents one of the largest coal reserves in Ukraine, having estimated reserves of 51.3 million tonnes. The annual coal production is around 523,000 tonnes. It is administratively under the state enterprise Makiivugol (Макіїввугілля).

The mine extracts thermal coal used in the energy sector, which is then transported to Starobesheve Thermal Power Plant in Novyi Svit.

== History ==
The mine incorporated the former fields of mines No. 3, No. 2, No. 10, and Pivdenna. It was first opened in 1957. Annual coal production reached 529,100 tonnes in 2008 before declining to 430,400 tonnes in 2010, then rising to 638,900 tonnes in 2011. In 2012, the mine exceeded its production plan by 9.9%. Following the outbreak of the War in the Donbas, Makiivka and the mine were taken over by pro-Russian separatists, who annexed it into the pro-Russian, self-declared Donetsk People's Republic. Later that year in September 2014 there was an explosion at the mine which killed three people.

In 2016, there were numerous strikes by the miners at the mine over unpaid wages, with salary arrears reported to have accumulated since September of the previous year. Attempts to organise protests were met with intimidation by armed groups and the Ministry of State Security of the DPR and the miners were called "exiled provocateurs". In June 2021, a new longwall face was commissioned by the occupation authorities following three months of downtime, which was expected to contain approximately 403,000 tonnes of coal reserves. Following the Russian invasion of Ukraine, the mine continued to operate and was subsequently annexed in a highly disputed referendum in 2022 by Russian authorities.

== See also ==
- Coal in Ukraine
- List of mines in Ukraine
