= Bilozerska coal mine =

Coal mine located in the south-east of Ukraine

Location
- Location: Bilozerske, Donetsk Oblast, Ukraine

Production
- Products: Coal
- Production: 975,000

History
- Opened: 1954

Owner
- Company: DTEK

The Bilozerska coal mine is a large coal mine located in the south-east of Ukraine in Donetsk Oblast. The mine was put into operation in 1954 with annual production capacity of 1 million tons. Bilozerska represents one of the largest coal reserve in Ukraine having estimated reserves of 80.4 million tonnes of coal. In 2003 the mine produced 898.9 thousand tons of coal. The extent of underground workings is 82.6/80 km (1996/1999). As per 1999 data, number of employees was 2632 persons, including 1615 underground workers. The annual coal production is around 975,000 tonnes.

== See also ==
- Coal in Ukraine
- List of mines in Ukraine
