= Kuibyshevskyi District, Donetsk =

Coordinates: 48°01′N 37°44′E

Kuibyshevskyi District Куйбишевський район
- Urban district
- Interactive map of Kuibyshevskyi District
- Country: Ukraine
- Oblast: Donetsk Oblast

Area
  - Total: 51 km^{2} (20 sq mi)

Population
  - Total: 118,157
- Time zone: UTC+2 (EET)
  - Summer (DST): UTC+3 (EEST)

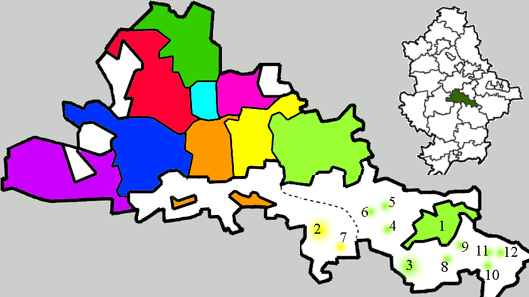
Districts of Donetsk on the territory of the Donetsk City Municipality: Budonivskyi District Voroshylovskyi District Kalininskyi District Kyivskyi District Kirovskyi District / Kuibyshevskyi District Leninskyi District Petrovskyi District Proletarskyi District

Kuibyshevskyi District (Ukrainian: Куйбишевський район, Russian: Куйбышевский район) is an urban district of the city of Donetsk, Ukraine, named after a Soviet political figure Valerian Kuybyshev.

It was created in 1937 as one of the first six original city districts. It is located at the northwestern part of the city.

On 22 February 2026, the Donetsk Oblast Military Administration renamed it to Smolianskyi District (Ukrainian: Смолянський район) as part of the decommunization and derussification campaign. This name comes from Smolianynivski Kopalni mines and the Smolianynova Hill. However, this name is only de jure used by the Ukrainian government and the renaming has not de facto taken place while Donetsk is under Russian control.

== Residential neighborhoods ==
Multi-storey developments

- Mahistralnyi
- Industrialnyi
- Azotnyi
- Zhylkop
- Karier
- Hirnyk
- Flora
- Zhovtneve
- Topaz
- Ploshcha Bakynskykh Komisariv

Settlements

- Smolyanka
- Zhovtneve
- Khimik
- Chervonyi Pakhar
- Hrabary
- Lozivske
- Administratyvnyi
- Hirnyk

== Industry ==
- Mines
  - Zhovtnevyi Rudnyk coal mine (part of the Donetsk Coal Power Company), flooded by militants of the Donetsk People's Republic
  - Kuibyshevska mine (part of the production association Donetskvuhillya), closed down
  - Maksim Gorky mine (part of the production association Donetskvuhillya)
  - Panfilovska mine (under the Mine Liquidation Administration), closed down
- Donetsk Coke-Production Factory, closed down
- Donbas Cable
- Topaz Factory, a military production factory with a design bureau of radio-technical instruments (among its products is Kolchuga passive sensor) in 2016 relocated to Russia by militants of the Donetsk People's Republic
- Donetsk Factory of chemical agents
- Donetsk Factory of chemical products

== Places ==
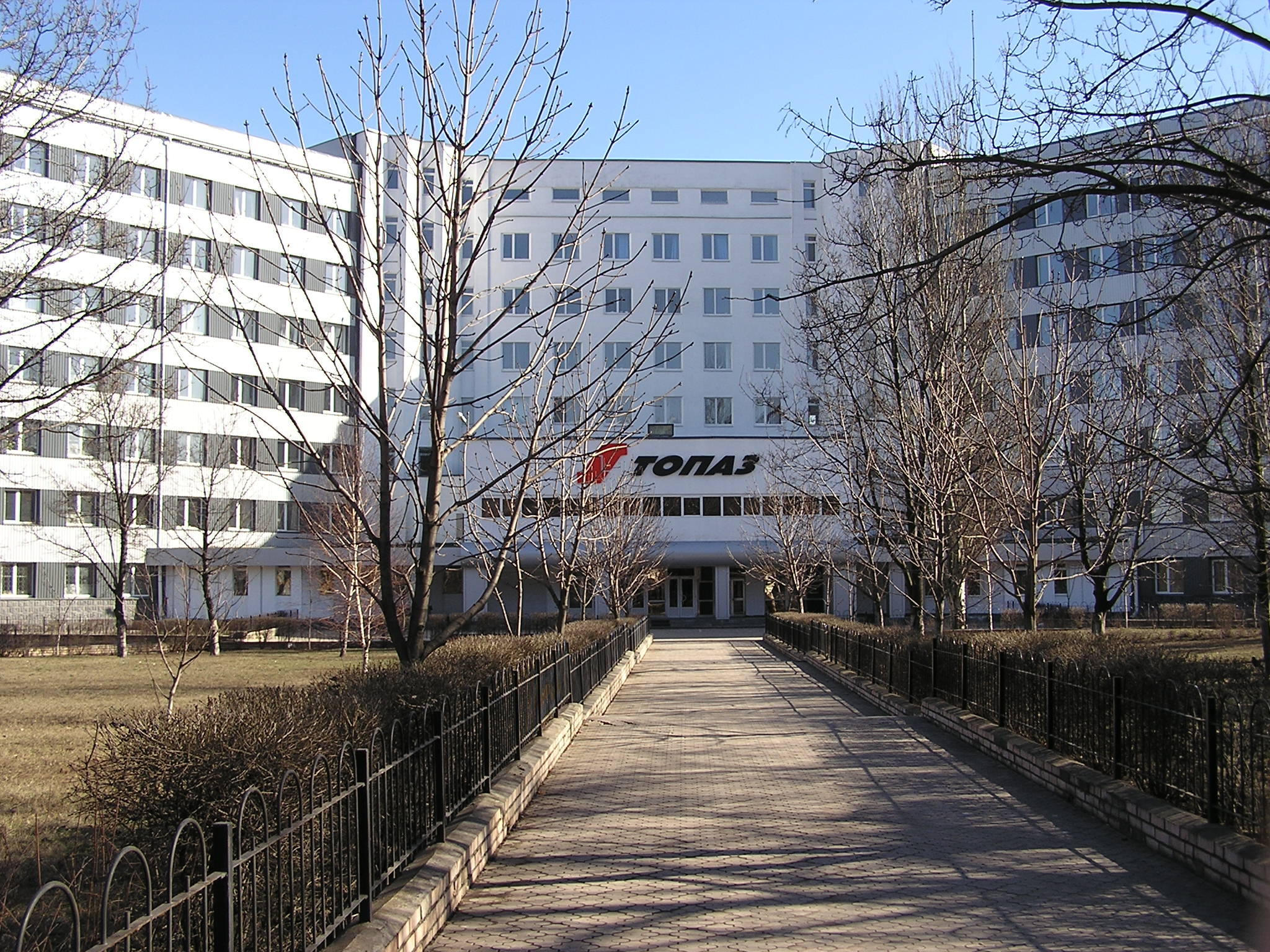
Topaz Factory

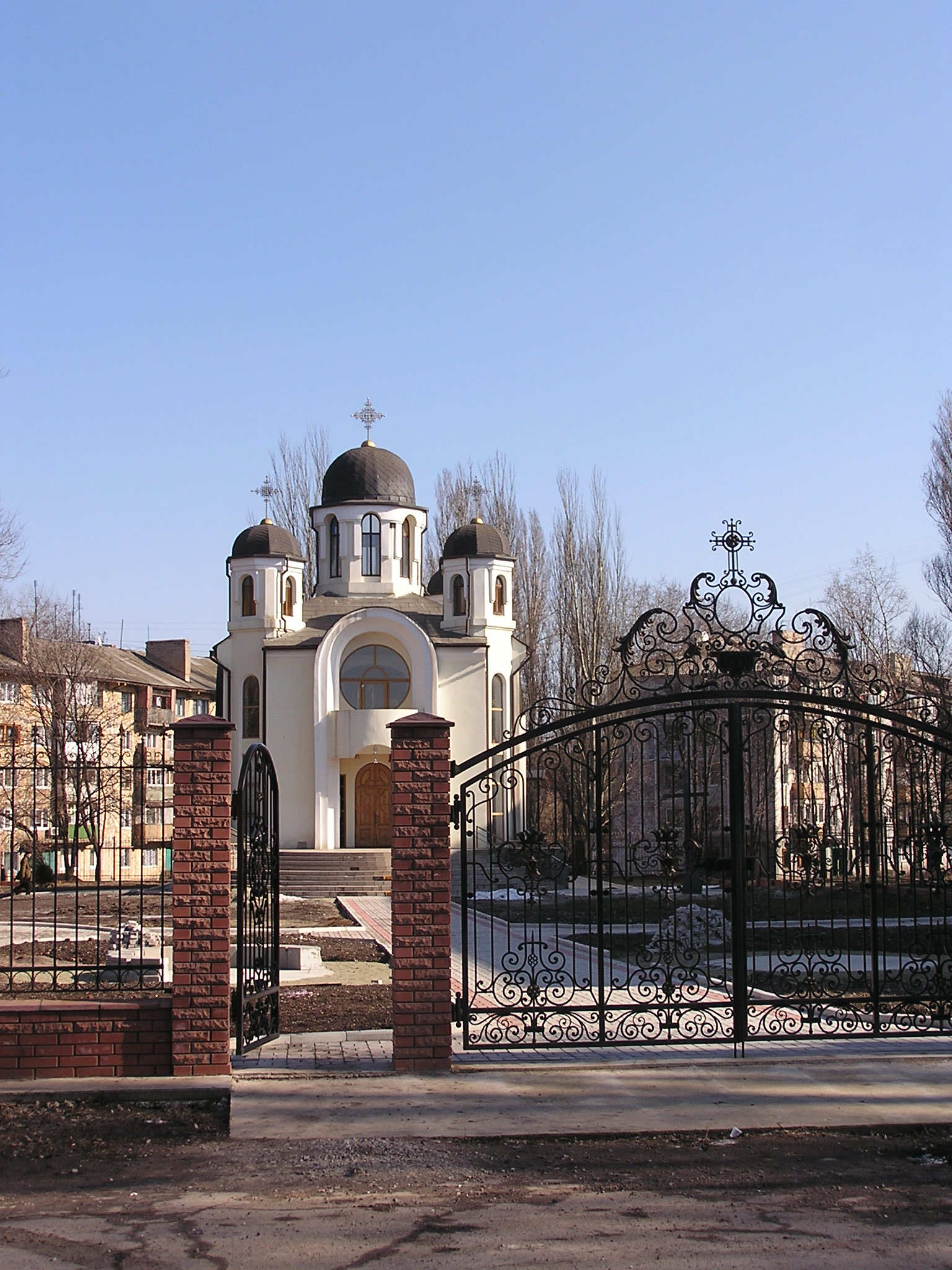
Greek Catholic Church, 2009

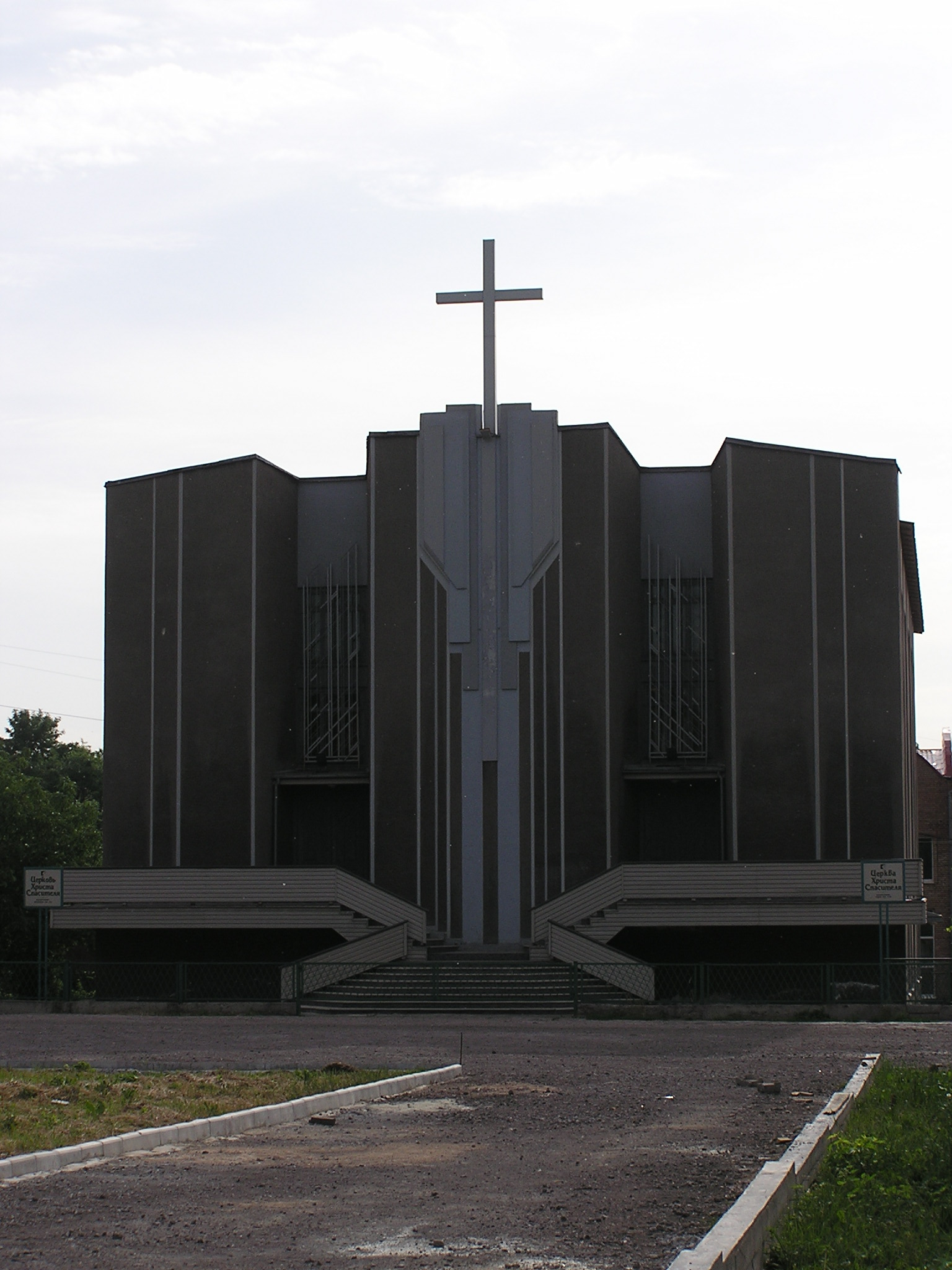
Church of Christ the Savior

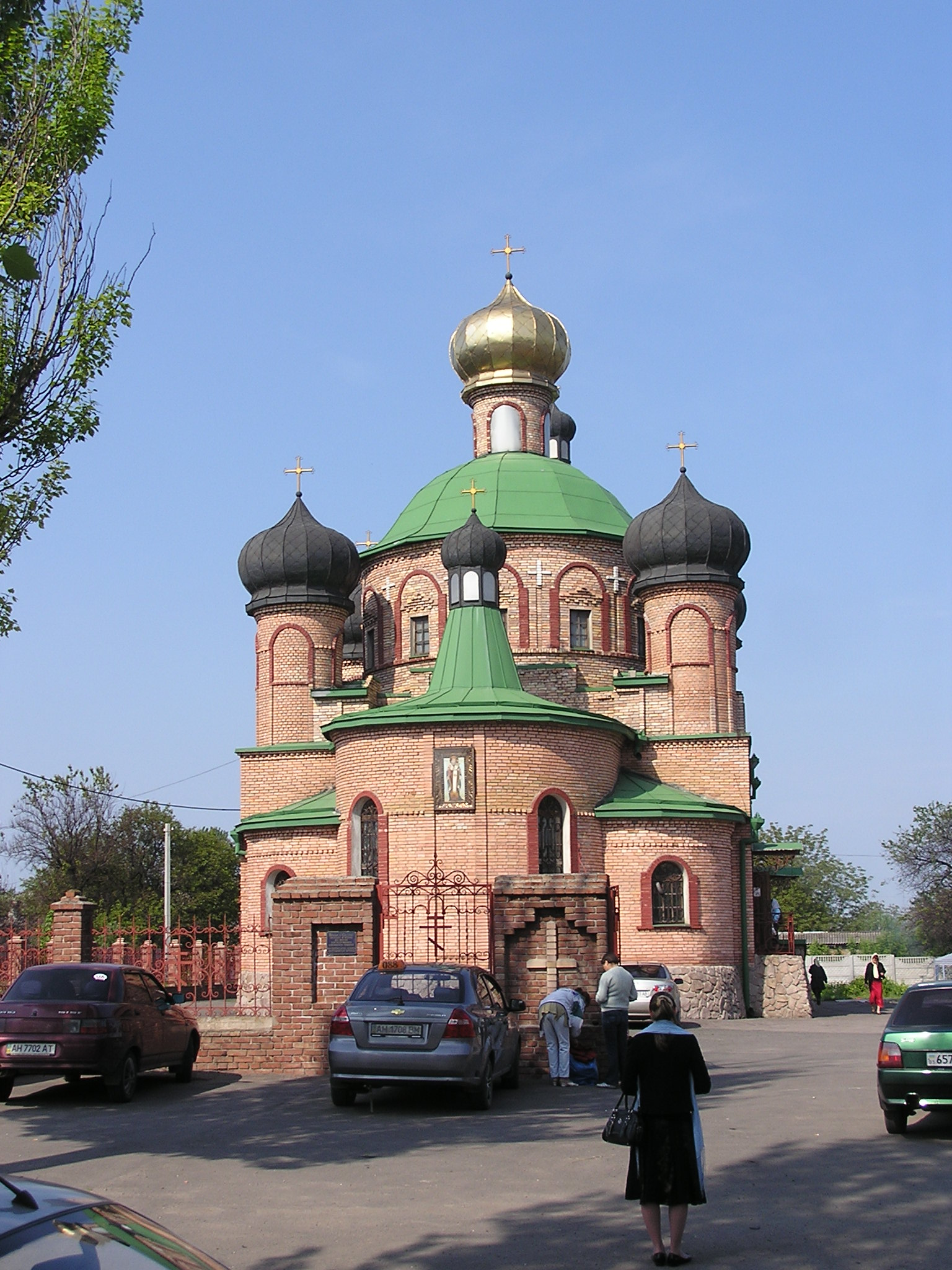
Temple of St.Ignatius (Ukrainian Orthodox Church (MP)), 2008

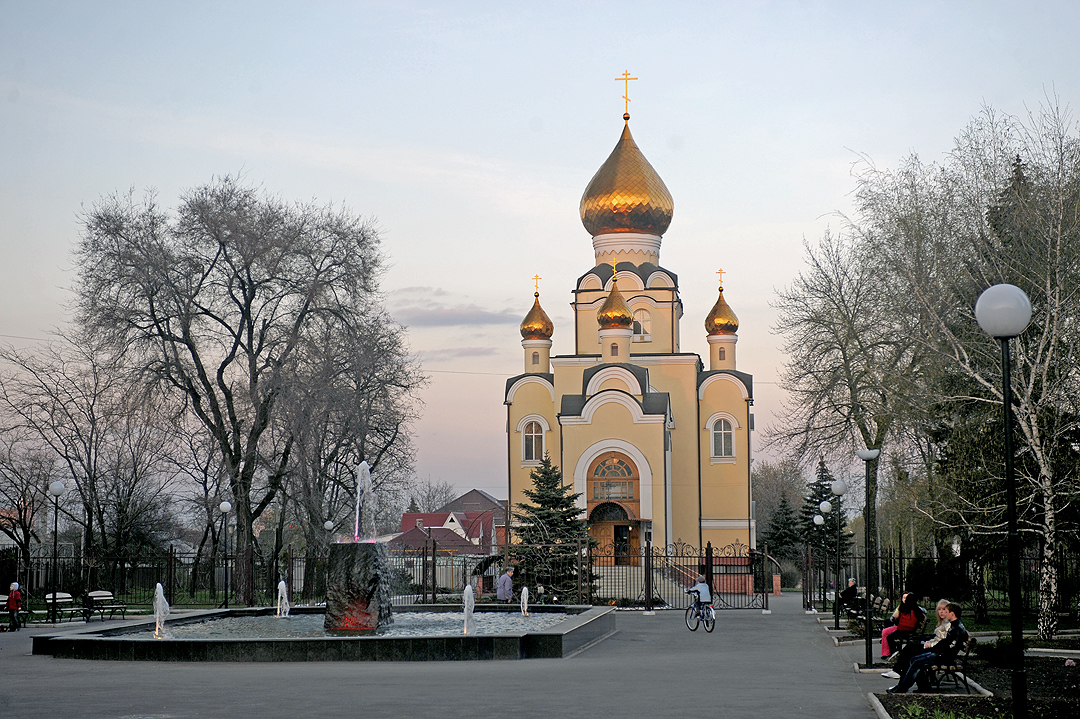
St.Vladimir Church, 2009

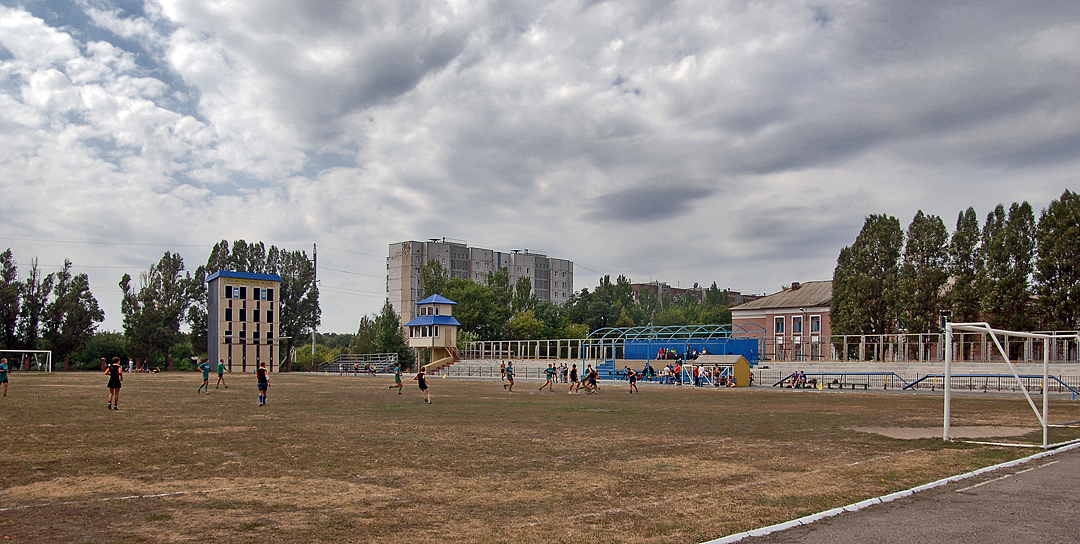
Sports Complex Olimp

== Notable people ==
- Akhat Bragin
