= Zuivska coal mine =

Coal mine in Donetsk Oblast, Ukraine

- Location: Zhdanivka, Donetsk Oblast, Ukraine
- Products: Coal
- Production: 570,000
- Opened: 1957
- Company: Zhovtenvuhillya

The Zuivska coal mine (Ukrainian: Шахта «Зуївська») is a large coal mine located in the south-east of Ukraine in Donetsk Oblast. Zuivska represents one of the largest coal reserves in Ukraine having estimated reserves of 17.4 million tonnes. The annual coal production is around 570,000 tonnes.

== See also ==
- Coal in Ukraine
- List of mines in Ukraine
