= Svitanok coal mine =

Coal mine located in Donetsk Oblast, Ukraine

- Interactive map of Svitanok coal mine
- Location: Kirovske, Donetsk Oblast, Ukraine
- Products: Coal
- Production: 463,000
- Opened: 1956

The Svitanok coal mine (Ukrainian: Шахта «Рассвєт») is a large coal mine located in the south-east of Ukraine in Donetsk Oblast. Svitanok represents one of the largest coal reserves in Ukraine, having estimated reserves of 14.3 million tonnes. The annual coal production is around 463,000 tonnes.

The mine extracts grade T coal.

== History ==
In September 2007, the Ukrainian Ministry of Coal Industry issued an order to terminate the activities of the state-owned enterprise DVAT Shakhta Rassvet, a subsidiary of the Zhovtenivuhillia holding company, which included the mine, and to reorganise it and merge it into the state enterprise Shakhtarskantratsyt. Two years later, in December 2009, an explosion occurred at the mine, injuring three miners. The incident was attributed to safety violations by a section mine foreman, leading to criminal proceedings, and the case was sent to court in December 2010.

The Ukrainian government later leased the mine to the Sadovaya Group, who were set to develop two longwalls in 2012. By early 2013, however, the group was seeking a buyer for the mine to pay off wage debts of 3.5 million hryvnias, following a fall in coal demand. Although information about the mine ceased after pro-Russian separatists seized and annexed the territory into the pro-Russian, self-declared Donetsk People's Republic, it is known that the mine was at the very least used as an active research site as of 2020 by Donetsk National Technical University.

== See also ==
- Coal in Ukraine
- List of mines in Ukraine
