= Pivdennodonbaska coal mine =

Pivdennodonbaska coal mine may refer to:

- Pivdennodonbaska 1 coal mine
- Pivdennodonbaska 3 coal mine
