= Kapitalna coal mine =

Coal mine in Myrnohrad, Ukraine

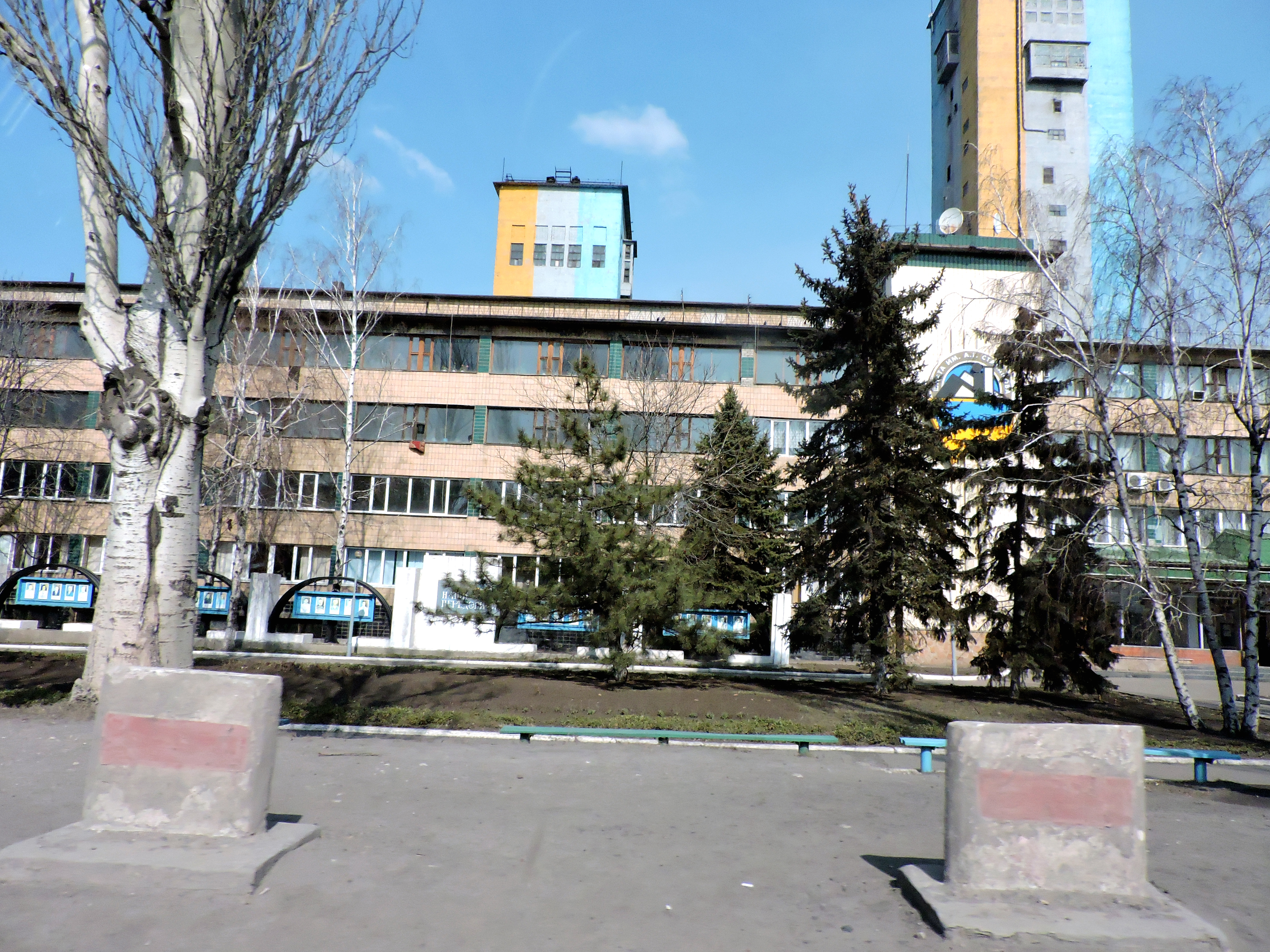
- The mine in 2015.
- Interactive map of Kapitalna coal mine
- Location: Myrnohrad, Donetsk Oblast, Ukraine
- Products: Coal
- Production: 1,850,000
- Opened: 1999
- Closed: 2024

The Kapitalna coal mine (Ukrainian: Шахта «Капітальна») (before 2017 - Stakhanov coal mine (Ukrainian: Шахта «Стаханова»)) is a large coal mine in the south-east of Ukraine in Donetsk Oblast. Kapitalna is one of the largest coal reserves in Ukraine, having estimated reserves of 139.7 million tonnes. The annual coal production is around 1.85 million tonnes.

In 2019, a new longwall was commissioned for the mine by PAT Tsentrenerho, and the mine started to be more profitable. Despite the Russian invasion of Ukraine in 2022, the mine continued to operate for two years in order to provide coal to the local population. However, following the Pokrovsk offensive reaching the now frontline city of Myrnohrad in 2024, the mine suspended operations temporarily.

== History ==
The mine was built according to the project of Dondiproshakht (chief engineer of the project - A.V. Cherenkov), which was completed in 1964 and approved by the Supreme Council of National Economy of the USSR Council of Ministers of the USSR by Order No. 114-R of August 2, 1965. It was previously named after Alexei Stakhanov, who set a production record at the Irmino mine in Luhansk Oblast, which led to the Stakhanovite movement to raise industrial productivity.

According to the latest amendments made by Dongiproshakht to the mine development project "Opening and preparation of the inclined minefield, preparation of the inclined field of the l3 (l1) block No. 4, construction of block No. 5", the design capacity of the mine was set at 2400 thousand tons per year. In 2014, however, the actual production capacity was only 1 million tons per year.

As of late 2019, the mine's daily coal output was approximately 1,600 tonnes. That year, the energy company PAT Tsentrenerho allocated 50 million hryvnias to launch a second northern longwall at the mine. Oleksandr Zorin, the then head of the state enterprise Myrnohradvillia, which the mine is under, stated this was the first time that an energy company had sponsored a coal extraction development. It was expected to raise the daily output to 3,000 tonnes. By 2021, the mine was assessed by experts as having long-term potential, but that it would still need substantial investment.

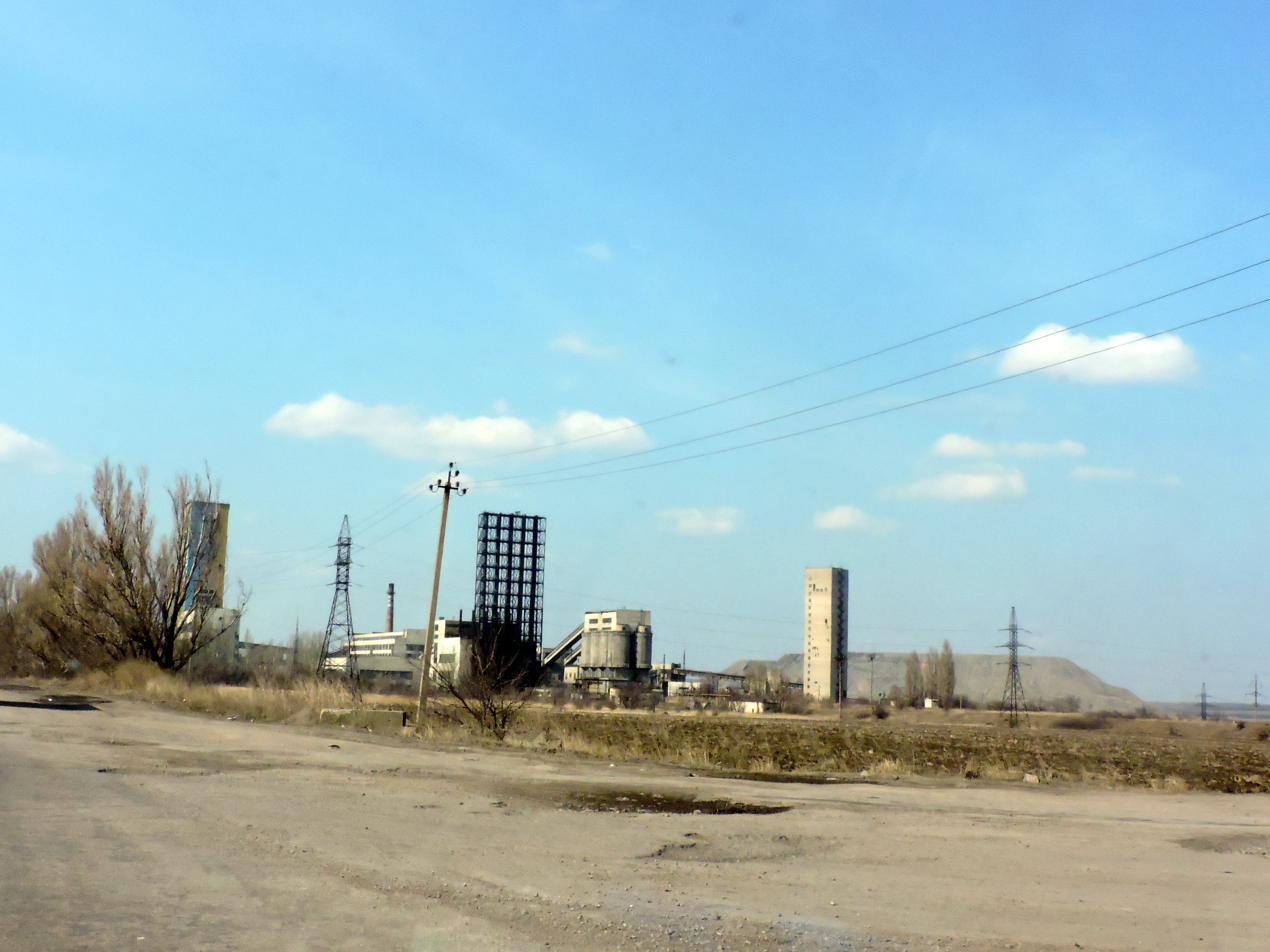
The eastern view of the mine and its slag heap.

Following the Russian invasion of Ukraine in 2022, the mine continued coal extraction in order to supply coal to the local population. Despite the war, the mine was still working to reduce its debt obligations and making plans for the future at the time. However, on 1 October 2024, the mine officially suspended operations during the Pokrovsk offensive, as Myrnohrad became a frontline city. In the months preceding the suspension, the mine was struck very regularly by Russian Armed Forces.

== Incidents ==
A roof collapse in the Stakhanov mine on August 18, 2011, killed two miners.

== See also ==
- Coal in Ukraine
- List of mines in Ukraine
