= Zhdanivska coal mine =

Coal mine in Donetsk Oblast, Ukraine

- Location: Zhdanivka, Donetsk Oblast, Ukraine
- Products: Coal
- Production: 712,000
- Opened: 1957
- Company: Zhovtenvuhillya

The Zhdanivska coal mine (Ukrainian: Шахта «Жданівська») is a large coal mine located in the south-east of Ukraine in Donetsk Oblast. With estimated reserves of 43.3 million tonnes, Zhdanivska represents one of the largest coal reserves in Ukraine. The annual coal production is around 712,000 tonnes.

Since 2014 the mine has been occupied by pro-Russian forces, initially with the Donetsk People's Republic and then from 2022 Russia itself.

== History ==
Since 2014, the mine has been controlled by pro-Russian separatists, who annexed the territory into the pro-Russian, self-declared Donetsk People's Republic during the War in the Donbas. After the annexation, the mine's director became Ruslan Dubovsky, who was concurrently serving as the DPR's Minister of Coal and Energy. In May 2014, the mine signed a contract with the Swiss company FLAME for the sale of 77,000 tonnes of energy coal of grade T. The Security Service of Ukraine (SBU) later alleged that through DPR leadership, the mine was organising a series of coal exports to international buyers worth over 433 million hryvnias, and later criminal proceedings were opened.

In 2022, the DPR was annexed by Russia in a highly controversial referendum. On 31 December 2024, the mine was transferred from the DPR's state authority, GURSH, to LLC "Shakht Zhdanovskaya" under a lease arrangement. The plan that was proposed was an investment of over 2 billion rubles in the mine by the company.

== Incidents ==
On 25 January 2014, a rock outburst occurred at 650 metres, which killed one miner and left three others in serious condition. Four years later, on 21 January 2018, an explosion of a methane mixture killed two miners.

== See also ==
- Coal in Ukraine
- List of mines in Ukraine
