= Kalinin coal mine =

Coal mine in Donetsk, Ukraine

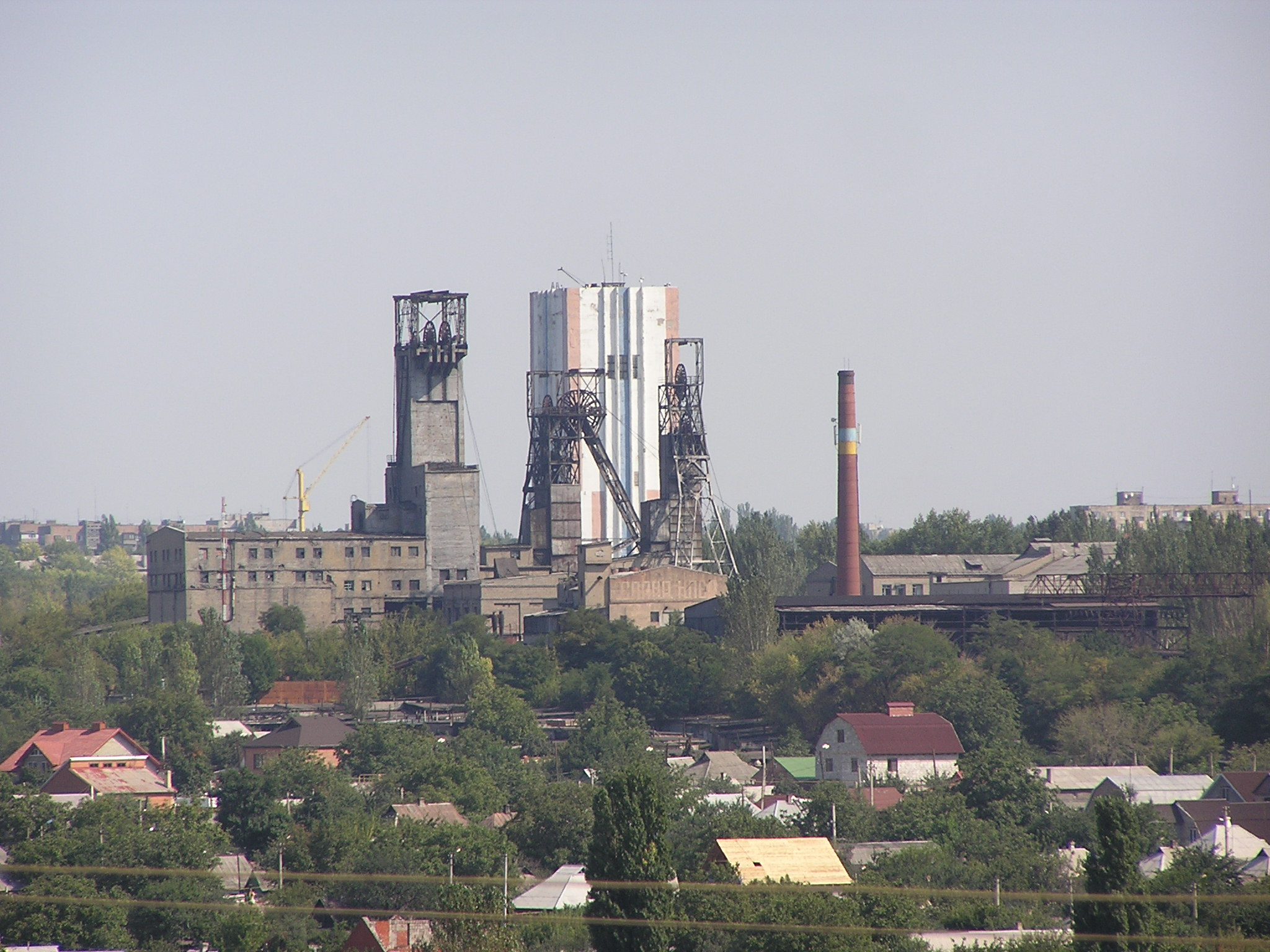
- The mine in 2008.

- Location within Donetsk Oblast Location within Ukraine
- Location: Donetsk, Donetsk Oblast, Ukraine; 48.016722°N 37.83986°E
- Products: Coal
- Production: 427,000
- Opened: 1961
- Company: Donetsk Coal Energy Company

The M. I. Kalinin coal mine (Ukrainian: Шахта імені М. І. Калініна) is a large coal mine located in the south-east of Ukraine in Donetsk Oblast. It is situated in the city of Donetsk in its Kalininskyi District. The mine forms part of the state enterprise Donetska Vuhilna Enerhetychna Kompaniya (also called Donetsk Coal Energy Company, abbreviated DVEK). The primary coal product extracted is grade OS coal.

Kalinin represents one of the largest coal reserves in Ukraine having estimated reserves of 14.9 million tonnes. The annual coal production is around 427,000 tonnes.

== History ==
The mine was constructed and designed by Dongiproshakht, and commenced operations in 1961 with a designed capacity of 1.2 million tonnes of coal per year. After the collapse of the Soviet Union, the mine came under the jurisdiction of Ukraine. By 2005, the actual annual production amounted to approximately 352,500 tonnes.

== See also ==
- Coal in Ukraine
- List of mines in Ukraine
