= Sergei Makarov =

Sergei Makarov or Sergey Makarov may refer to:

- Sergei Makarov (ice hockey), Russian ice hockey right winger and two-time Olympic gold medalist
- Sergey Makarov (javelin thrower) (born 1973), Russian javelin thrower
- Sergey Makarov (volleyball), Russian volleyball player
- Sergei Makarov (footballer) (born 1996), Russian football midfielder
- Sergey Makarov (politician) (born 1983), Russian politician
