= Komsomolets Donbasu coal mine =

Coal mine in Donetsk, Ukraine

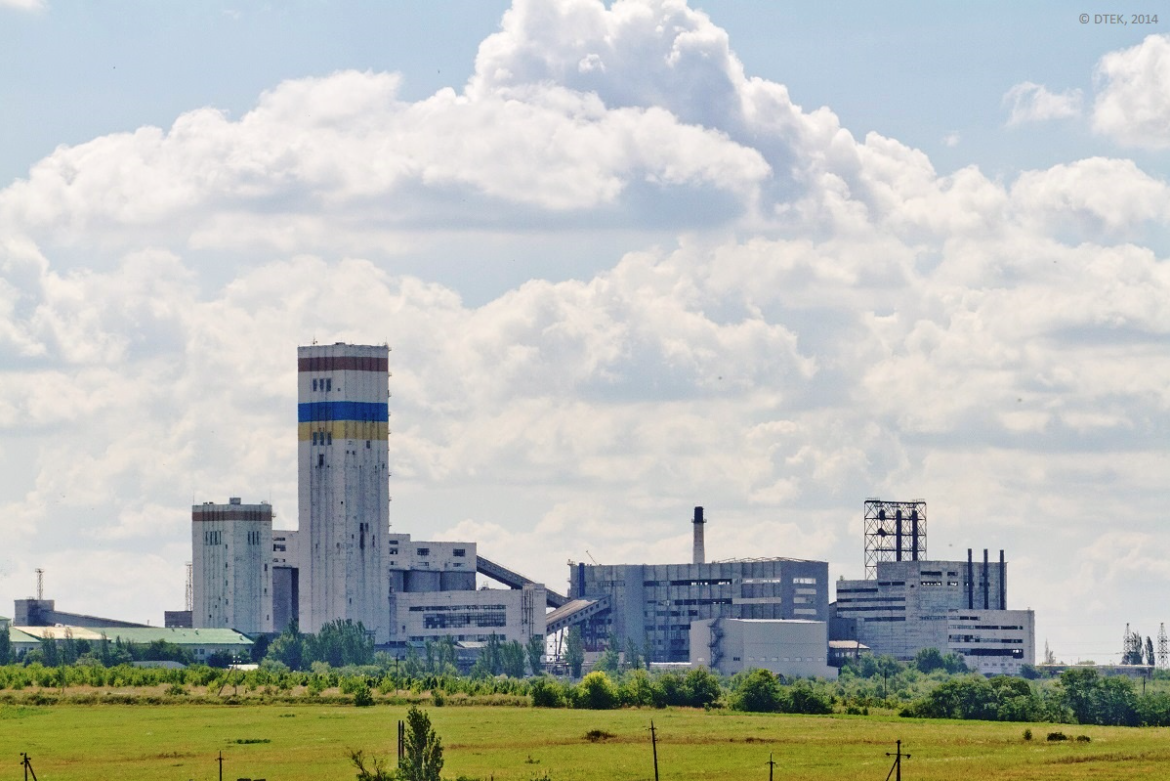
- The mine in September 2014.

- Location within Donetsk Oblast Location within Ukraine
- Location: Khrestivka, Donetsk Oblast, Ukraine; 48.164°N 38.374°E
- Products: Coal
- Production: 2,120,000
- Opened: 1980
- Company: DTEK (Rinat Akhmetov)

The Komsomolets of Donbas coal mine (Ukrainian: Шахта «Комсомолець Донбасу») is a large coal mine located in the south-east of Ukraine in Donetsk Oblast. The mine is situated in the city of Khrestivka (formerly Kirovske). Komsomolets of Donbas represents one of the largest coal reserves in Ukraine having estimated reserves of 137.5 million tonnes. The annual coal production is around 2.12 million tonnes.

The mine extracts primarily grade P coal, with its primary consumers being thermal power stations. It was leased to DTEK starting in 2005, and prior to 2014 was considered one of the leading coal enterprises in 2014, accounting for 4.4% of total Ukrainian coal production in 2008 alone. Following the outbreak of the War in the Donbas, the mine came under the control of the pro-Russian, self-declared Donetsk People's Republic, and subsequently in 2022 the DPR was annexed into Russia. Under the occupation authorities, the mine frequently halted production and was subsequently leased to the Rostov-on-Don based company Impex-Don.

== History ==
The mine was commissioned in 1980 as Zhdanovska-Kapitalna No. 1, with a designed capacity of 2,100,000 tonnes of coal per year. Construction had begun 6 years earlier, in 1974. It was renamed to Komsomolets Donbasu in 1981 in honour of the people who built the mine, who were members of the Komsomol. By 1990, the annual production was 2,228,000 tonnes, and by 2008 this increased to 3,400,000 tonnes, which represented 4.4% of total Ukrainian coal production that year.

In January 2013, a methane outbreak occurred at the time, killing one person, leading to internal investigations and criminal proceedings. Following the outbreak of the War in the Donbas, the mine remained on the frontlines for multiple months, and armed fighters broke into the mine multiple times, stealing vehicles, cash, and abducting the mine's director and his deputy. In October 2014, as pro-Russian separatists advanced into the town, the mine came under artillery fire on many occasions, which caused flooding and extensive damage to the mine. After the DPR reached the town and established a foothold in October, the area was annexed into the pro-Russian, self-declared Donetsk People's Republic.

By March 2017, the mine had halted production under the occupation authorities, with most workers going on unpaid leave. In August 2020, a fire broke out at the top of the main shaft, shutting down all power to it for multiple days. Following the highly disputed 2022 annexation referendums in Russian-occupied Ukraine, the DPR was incorporated into Russia. Following this, in the spring of 2024, the Ministry of Coal and Energy of the DPR announced that the mine would be leased to the Rostov-on-Don company Impex-Don, which is owned by Russian oligarch Oleg Gryzlov. However, in April 2025, it was reported that Impex-Don was attempting to relinquish control of its mines due to high operation costs.

== See also ==
- Coal in Ukraine
- List of mines in Ukraine
