= Bilytska coal mine =

Coal mine in Ukraine

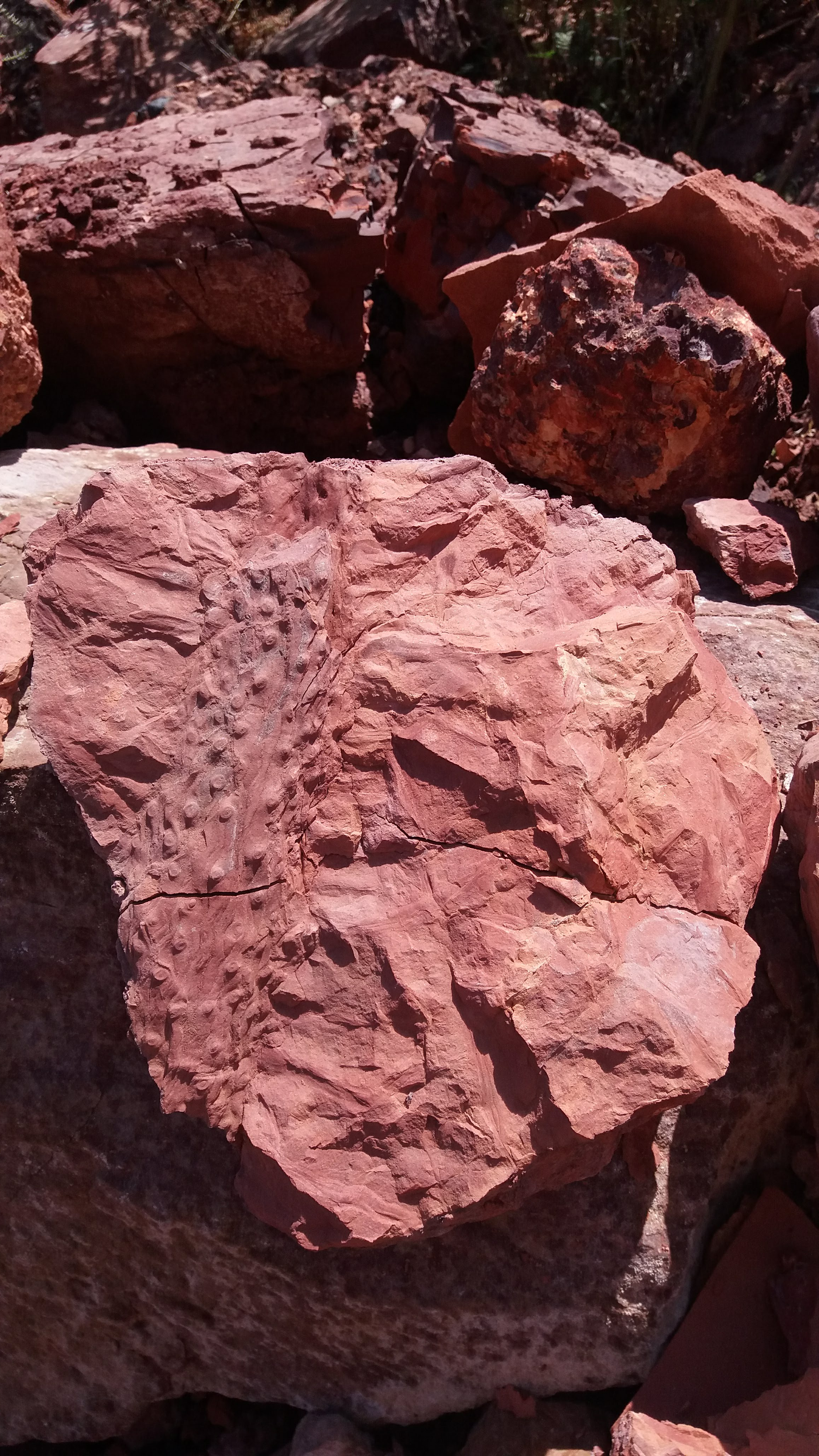
- Stigmaria from the Bilytska coal mine.
- Location: Bilytske, Donetsk Oblast, Ukraine
- Products: Coal
- Production: 427,000
- Opened: 1959
- Closed: 2025
- Company: DTEK Dobropolyeugol

The Bilytska coal mine was a large coal mine located in the south-east of Ukraine in Donetsk Oblast. Bilytska represented one of the largest coal reserve in Ukraine, having estimated reserves of 68.2 million tonnes of coal. The annual coal production was around 427,000 tonnes.

The mine was released to Rinat Akhmetov's DTEK Dobropolyeugol between 2010 and 2020, but was frozen starting in 2014 citing geological complications and never resumed full operation. Following its return to state ownership in 2020, the Ukrainian government formally approved its liquidation on 21 February 2025 after years of unprofability. The mine was subsequently destroyed during the Russian invasion of Ukraine in the Dobropillia offensive.

== History ==
Since 2014, the mine has only functioned as a water pumping station, with around 150 workers being employed just to prevent flooding and to monitor the tunnels. The full reopening of the mine became a particular issue in the area, due to residents wanting to leave with no economic revival. During the 2020 Ukrainian local elections, many local miners promised to reopen the mine as part of a central campaign issue, arguing that Ukraine still needed its coal industry and not a full green energy transition.

In October 2021, the state enterprise conducted an economic feasibility study on whether to reopen the mine. Two scenarios were considered: preserving the existing minefield development scheme or the full liquidation of the mine. An alternate path was also theorized earlier in 2018 that it could be converted into a hydroelectric pumped-storage power station with a capacity of around 60 MW, following models in Germany. On 21 February 2025, the Cabinet of Ministers of Ukraine formally approved the latter case to liquidate the mine, on the proposal of the Ministry of Energy. Shortly afterwards, Russian-aligned sources and the head of the self-proclaimed Donetsk People's Republic, Denis Pushilin, claimed that Ukrainian forces had blown up the mine during their retreat to Pokrovsk, alleging the destruction was intended to hamper infrastructure recovery. Later that year in August 2025 this was confirmed through Ukrainian sources by Mykhailo Volynets, who disputed the Russian account of Ukrainians blowing up the mine saying that Russian forces were actually the ones who had destroyed the mine during the Dobropillia offensive.

== Ownership and profitability ==
In 2010, DTEK Dobropolyeugol, owned by Rinat Akhmetov, took over the lease for the mine, which was meant to run until 2059. The mine was frozen from starting from 2014 due to unprofitability. At the time of the freezing, the mine had been assessed at approximately 86 million tons of reserves, though later official reports by DTEK placed the remaining reserves at 5.6 million tons with industrial reserves of 4.87 million tons. DTEK states they froze the mine because of geological complications that emerged, such as water influxes, rock collapses in the longwalls, and the longwall coal seam shrinking, and furthermore claimed they wouldn't have signed the lease if they knew of the condition of the mine. In 2020, the Shmyhal Government agreed to accept the mine back into state ownership ahead of DTEK's upcoming lease expiration. The government also agreed to pay Akhmetov 397.8 million hryvnias for the property.

The mine was part of the state enterprise "Dobropilliavuhillia-vydobutok" under the Ukrainian government, and was the main local budget-forming enterprise for the area. However, by profitability, it was considered "a least profitable" mine by analytics in its final operational years and had to receive a state support commitment of 2.5 million hryvnias.

== See also ==
- Coal in Ukraine
- List of mines in Ukraine
