= Yasynivska–Hlyboka coal mine =

Coal mine in Donetsk, Ukraine

- Location: Makiivka, Donetsk Oblast, Ukraine
- Products: Coal
- Production: 434,000
- Opened: 1961
- Company: Makeevugol (Макіїввугілля, de jure); GUP DNR "Makeevugol" (de facto)

The Yasynivska–Hlyboka coal mine is a coal mine located in the city of Makiivka, Donetsk Oblast, Ukraine. Yasynivska–Hlyboka represents one of the largest coal reserves in Ukraine, having estimated reserves of 41.5 million tonnes. The annual coal production is around 434,000 tonnes.

The mine originally began production in 1961, after having started construction in 1952. After a series of upgrades during the 1970s into the 1980s, the mine employed around 2,067 people in 2000. Following the collapse of the Soviet Union, the mine came under the control of the state enterprise "Makeevugol". During the War in the Donbas in 2014, pro-Russian separatists seized control of the territory and annexed it into the pro-Russian, self-declared Donetsk People's Republic, which was later itself annexed into Russia in a highly disputed referendum. Since its control by the DPR, the mine has opened new longwalls, but has also been the site of labour disputes over wages.

== History ==
The Yasynivska–Hlyboka coal mine began operation in 1961. Construction of the mine had begun around a decade earlier, in 1952, with the laying of the shaft centres. Initially, mining started at the 380-meter level. In January 1972, a new coal mining complex was introduced, in 1974 the first domestic multi-rope hoisting machine was tested at the mine, and in 1976, a plow unit was installed to raise the output of the mine. In December 1980, more production sections became operational at the 475-meter level.

As of January 2000, the mine employed a total of 2,067 persons, including 1,605 underground mine workers. In December 2010, Yasynivska–Hlyboka coal mine was proposed for privatization by Ukraine's Ministry of Coal Industry among a list of 40 coal mines.

=== War in the Donbas ===
In 2014, following fighting near the city of Makiivka due to the start of the War in the Donbas, coal extraction at all enterprises under Makeevugol (which included the mine), was completely halted, and water pumping also ceased. Soon after, pro-Russian separatists seized the mine and annexed it into the pro-Russian, self-declared Donetsk People's Republic. It continued to operate under the new owner. In the summer of 2015, miners at the mine went on strike over unpaid wages dating back to March of that year. Following this, the Minister of Coal Industry of the DPR and the Head of the DPR, Alexander Zakharchenko, arrived at the mine with militants to suppress the strike, and the miners were paid 75% of their wages. There were later unconfirmed reports of miners who attempted to strike again being detained and intimidated. In November 2016, there were reports that the enterprise was going to cease to exist, and instead merge with the Pivnichna mine.

On 27 November 2017, coal extraction was halted when the first western longwall was stopped due to the impossibility of extraction due to the geology. Preparations were made to stop mining in order to construct a new first western relief longwall. Coal mining resumed in October 2018. In August 2020, a new third eastern relief longwall was put into operation, with occupation leader Denis Pushilin attending the ceremony. As of early 2020, DPR state sources state the mine is producing OS-grade coal with plans to create a new fourth and fifth eastern longwall.

== Mining incident ==
In December 1986, an explosion in the mine killed 30 people and left 10 injured.

In February 2003, a coal and methane outburst occurred at the miners, trapping ten of the miners. Six were immediately rescued. In July 2006, a collapse occurred in the mine, trapping two miners beneath the debris. Four mountain rescue teams were sent to the mine and the miners have been successfully rescued from the rubble. In November 2017, a roof collapsed in the mine. Eighteen miners were in the longwall, with sixteen escaping.

== See also ==
- Coal in Ukraine
- List of mines in Ukraine
