= Kirov coal mine =

Coal mine in Donetsk, Ukraine

- Location: Makiivka, Donetsk Oblast, Ukraine
- Products: Coal
- Production: 765,000
- Opened: 1996

The Kirov coal mine (Ukrainian: Шахта імені С. М. Кірова) is a large coal mine located in the south-east of Ukraine in Donetsk Oblast. The mine is situated in the city of Makiivka, and is part of the state enterprise "Makiivvuhillia" (Макіїввугілля). Kirov represents one of the largest coal reserves in Ukraine having estimated reserves of 23.6 million tonnes. The annual coal production is around 765,000 tonnes.

== History ==
The mine was originally formed in 1996 on the basis of two earlier mines, Mine No. 1 imeni S.M. Kirova (commissioned in 1947, capacity of 90,000 tonnes per year) and the Kirovska-Zakhidna mine (commissioned in 1948, capacity of 100,000 tonnes per year). By January 2007, the mine's production capacity was 600,000 tonnes per year, working in two seams: l1 and h10v.

In December 2007, the Ukrainian Ministry of Coal Industry issued an order to liquidate the mine, with physical liquidation contracted to be completed by 2012. Following the outbreak of the War in the Donbas in 2014, the mine was seized by pro-Russian separatists who incorporated it into the pro-Russian, self-declared Donetsk People's Republic. After this, the mine continued to operate under the DPR. In 2020, there were reports from Ukrainian sources that the occupation authorities intended to close the mine alongside others in the region due to reduced quotas for coal sales into Russia.

== See also ==
- Coal in Ukraine
- List of mines in Ukraine
