= Chervonokutska coal mine =

Coal mine in Ukraine

- Location: Krasnyi Luch, Luhansk Oblast, Ukraine
- Products: Coal
- Company: Donbasantratsyt

The Chervonokutska coal mine is an underground coal mine in the city of Krasnyi Luch, which is part of Luhansk Oblast in Ukraine.

== History ==
The mine shaft was constructed in the 1970s, and became part of the Donbasantratsyt state enterprise. It was considered one of the most modern coal facilities in the area prior to 2014. In 2014, the mine was captured by pro-Russian separatists, who annexed it into the pro-Russian, self-declared Lugansk People's Republic. Following the highly disputed 2022 annexation referendums in Russian-occupied Ukraine, Russia claimed the area. In 2023, Russian forces demolished the mine's shaft tower and cut it up for scrap metal, which was confirmed through Ukrainian sources by Artem Lysohor, the then head of the Luhansk Regional Military Administration.

== 2011 mine disaster ==
An explosion in the mine on August 4, 2011, killed one worker and injured 25 others, including several who received severe burns. The explosion, at a depth of 155 m, was attributed to methane gas accumulation. Ukraine's Minister of Energy and Coal Industry, Yuriy Boyko, speculated that there had been errors in installation of a ventilation system intended to prevent methane build-up. Boyko announced that the mine's director and safety manager would be suspended while the accident was investigated.

== See also ==
- Coal in Ukraine
- List of mines in Ukraine
