= List of mines in Ukraine =

The following list of mines in Ukraine is subsidiary to the lists of mines in Europe article and Lists of mines articles. This list contains working, defunct and future mines in the country and is organised by the primary mineral output(s) and province. For practical purposes stone, marble and other quarries may be included in this list. Operational mines are demarcated by bold typeface, future mines are demarcated in italics.

== Coal mines ==
- Almazna coal mine
- Bazhanov coal mine
- Bilorichenska coal mine
- Bilozerska coal mine
- Bilytska coal mine
- Dobropilska coal mine
- Faschivska coal mine
- Hirske coal mine
- Hlyboka coal mine
- Kalinin coal mine
- Kholodna Balka coal mine
- Kirov coal mine
- Komsomolets Donbasu coal mine
- Krasnoarmiiska–Zakhidna coal mine
- Krasnokutska coal mine
- Krasnolymanska coal mine
- Molodohvardiiska coal mine
- Pivdennodonbaska 1 coal mine
- Pivdennodonbaska 3 coal mine
- Skochinsky coal mine
- Stakhanov coal mine
- Sukhodilska–Skhidna coal mine
- Svitanok coal mine
- Vinnytska coal mine
- Yasynivska–Hlyboka coal mine
- Zasyadko coal mine
- Zhdanivska coal mine
- Zhovtnevyi Rudnyk coal mine
- Zuivska coal mine

== Copper mines ==
- Copper mines of the Bakhmut Basin "Kartamysh"

== Gold mines ==
- Muzhiyevo gold mine
- Berehove gold mine
- Kvasovo gold mine

== Graphite mines ==
- Zavalye mine

== Salt mines ==
- Soledar Salt Mine
