= Samara (Dnieper) =

River in Ukraine

Samara River
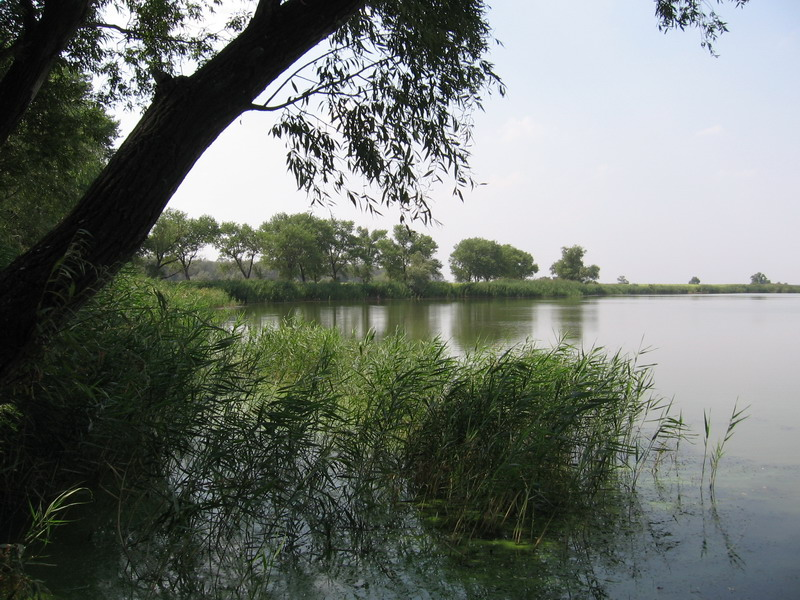

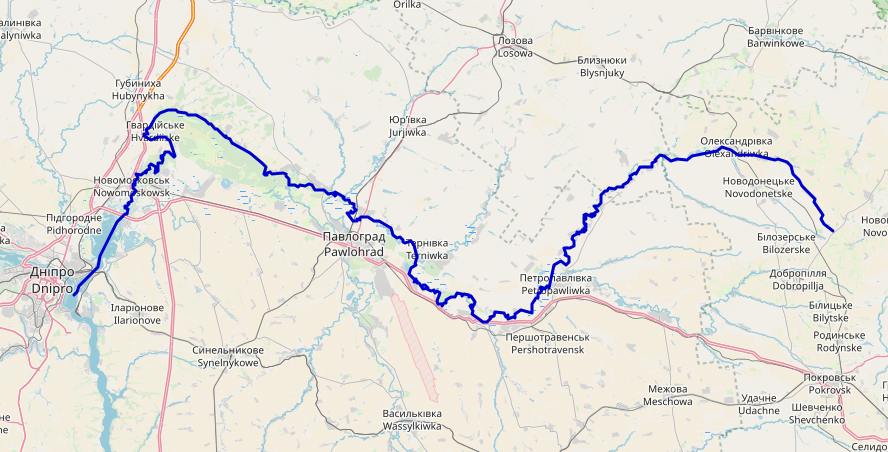

Location
- Country: Ukraine

Physical characteristics
- Mouth
  - location: Dnieper
  - coordinates: 48°28′51″N 35°09′13″E
- Length: 320 km (200 mi)
- Basin size: 22,600 km^{2} (8,700 sq mi)
- Discharge
  - average: 20 m^{3}/s (710 cu ft/s)

Basin features
- Progression: Dnieper→ Dnieper–Bug estuary→ Black Sea

The Samara (Ukrainian: Самара) is a river in Ukraine, a left tributary of the Dnieper. The city of Dnipro is located near the confluence of the Dnieper and the Samara.

The river has a length of 320 km and a drainage basin of 22,600 km². From its source, near the village of Mar'ivka in the suburbs of Kramatorsk in Donetsk Oblast, the river flows through the oblasts of Kharkiv (briefly) and Dnipropetrovsk (for most of its length). As it approaches the Dnieper, it goes through Samara Bay (formerly Lenin Lake), an artificial lake 10 km long and 3 km wide, formed as a result of the hydroelectric dam on the Dnieper.

The Samara is mostly used for irrigation and fish farming. The water quantities are variable, mainly because the river is fed by snowmelt from the spring thaw. The width of the river varies between 40 and 60 meters, with 300 m being the maximum.

The most important tributaries of the Samara are the Vovcha and the Byk.

The largest cities on the river are Oleksandrivka, Ternivka, Pavlohrad, and Samar.
