= Sergey Makarov (politician) =

Russian politician and miner (born 1983)

- Сергей Макаров

Member of the State Duma
- Incumbent
- Assumed office 30 September 2026
- Preceded by: Constituency created
- Constituency: Horlivka (No. 15) (Note: His constituency, Horlivka, has been controlled by the Russian-backed, separatist Donetsk People's Republic (DPR) since 2014. During the 2022 Russian invasion of Ukraine, Russia declared the annexation of the DPR. The UN General Assembly rejected the annexation under Resolution ES-11/4, and the vast majority of international countries do not recognise it either. The city is still internationally considered part of Ukraine but under Russian occupation.)

Personal details
- Born: Sergey Valerievich Makarov; 1 December 1983 (age 42) Donetsk, Ukrainian SSR, Soviet Union
- Party: United Russia
- Education: Donetsk National Technical University (2006)

Sergey Valerievich Makarov (Russian: Сергей Валериевич Макаров; born 1 December 1983) is a Russian and formerly Ukrainian politician and miner who has served as a member of the State Duma of the 9th convocation for the United Russia party since 2026. Prior to this, he worked at various coal enterprises and was Deputy General Director of "Impex-Don".

== Early life ==
Makarov was born on 1 December 1983 in Donetsk, which was then part of the Ukrainian SSR of the Soviet Union. In 2006, he graduated from the Donetsk National Technical University in what was then Donetsk, Ukraine, with a master's degree in the development of mineral deposits. While studying, he worked briefly from 2005 to 2006 as a mining foreman at the Oktyabrsky Mine in Donetsk. After graduation, Makarov became a junior researcher at the Donetsk Coal Research Institute, specifically within the laboratory for mine workings. After two years there, he left in 2008 to work at the Skochinsky coal mine in Donetsk as a leading mining engineer, a position Makarov would hold for another four years until 2012. He then briefly served as chief technologist at NPK Technoprom LLC, before he transferred to become deputy chief technologist of the coal division of Coal Energy LLC in 2013. After the start of the War in the Donbas and the creation of the separatist Donetsk People's Republic (DPR), Makarov stayed in Donetsk, and in 2015 got a job as a leading design engineer at the Donetsk Design and Industrial Institute. Makarov stayed here for another three years until he moved to the Donetsk Coal Energy Company, a state enterprise of the DPR, where he worked in a variety of positions until 2021. He was transferred back to the Skochinsky coal mine, where he had worked from 2008 to 2012, to become chief engineer. He held this position up until 2024.

In 2024, Maskarov became the Deputy Director of Impex-Don LLC for its coal holdings. During his time there, just before he was elected to the State Duma, Makarov said that the enterprises of the Donbas, including Impex-Don, should be developed to meet the needs of the "whole of Russia" and that high-tech clusters should be made.

== Political career ==
In 2026, Makarov announced his intentions run in the upcoming 2026 Russian legislative elections for the 9th convocation with United Russia. As this was the first state Duma elections where constituencies were introduced for the newly annexed Donetsk People's Republic (DPR), Makarov ran within the newly created constituency No. 15. The 15th district consisted of the cities of Horlivka (the seat), Debaltseve, parts of Donetsk, Yenakiieve, Snizhne, Chistyakove, Shakhtarsk, and Yasynuvata. It also included cities within the still Ukrainian-controlled Donetsk Oblast, such as Kramatorsk, Sloviansk, and Lyman, which are farther north, as well as ruined cities due to fighting, such as Bakhmut and Avdiivka. He was successfully elected with 62.38% of the vote, with the closest competitor being Andrei Kramar of the Liberal Democratic Party of Russia.

== Personal life ==
He is married and has a daughter.

== International sanctions ==
On 12 October 2026, Makarov was included on the international sanctions list of the European Union for his association with the United Russia party and for participating in the 2026 elections in the DPR. He has also been included on the French sanctions register as part of his sanctions under the EU, and the national asset freezing list of Monaco in compliance with the EU since 2026. In Ukraine, he has been included in the sanctions list of the country since 2026. He is also included in the Ukrainian database Myrotvorets.
