= Pivdennodonbaska 3 coal mine =

Coal mine in Donetsk, Ukraine

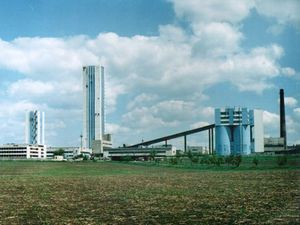
- The mine prior to 2024.
- Interactive map of Pivdennodonbaska 3 coal mine
- Location: Vuhledar, Donetsk Oblast, Ukraine
- Products: Coal
- Production: 1,420,000
- Opened: 1985

The Pivdennodonbaska 3 coal mine (Ukrainian: Шахта «Південнодонбаська № 3») is a large coal mine located in the south-east of Ukraine in Donetsk Oblast. Pivdennodonbaska 3 represents one of the largest coal reserves in Ukraine having estimated reserves of 156.9 million tonnes. The annual coal production is around 1.42 million tonnes. The mine has three horizons, with the deepest reaching 980 metres, and in 2022, prior to the Russian invasion of Ukraine employed a staff of about 3,685 people.

Footage from 15 September 2024 has shown that the mine was captured by Russian Armed Forces, who demolished the mine's 115-metre main shaft with explosives, which Russian-backed sources claimed had been mined by Ukrainian forces during their retreat, although no proof has been given towards this claim.

== History ==
Design work on the mine began in 1964, which was intended to turn Vuhledar into an industrial town. The mine was finally commissioned in 1985, making it one of the youngest mines in the Donbas. However, it took until 1998 for the mine to reach the designed capacity of its first phase. Prior to Euromaidan in 2014, the mine formed part of the state enterprise Donetska Vuhilna Enerhetychna Kompaniya (DVEK). Following the outbreak of the War in the Donbas, the mine continued to remain under firm Ukrainian control. Later that year, in December, the mine was formally separated from DVEK by the government and re-registered to a new independent state enterprise, which was due in part to delays caused by the previous DVEK director, who had defected and backed pro-Russian separatist forces.

In April 2015, miners staged a strike after not having received wages for approximately six months, with debts exceeding 73 million hryvnias. Workers received a partial payment by the government later on, but it was less than a third of what was owed. Following the Russian invasion of Ukraine, the mine ceased operations due to its proximity to the frontlines, especially as Vuhledar became a target, and all equipment from the mine was evacuated. In September 2024, Russian forces entered the village and started its occupation.

== See also ==
- Coal in Ukraine
- List of mines in Ukraine
