= Bazhanov coal mine =

Large coal mine in southeastern Ukraine

Coordinates: 48°05′N 38°04′E

Bazhanov coal mine Шахта імені В. М. Бажанова
- Interactive map of Bazhanov coal mine Шахта імені В. М. Бажанова

Location
- Location: Makiivka, Donetsk Oblast, Ukraine

Production
- Products: Coal
- Production: 1,020,000

History
- Opened: 1957

Owner
- Company: Makiivvuhillya (Макіїввугілля)

The Bazhanov coal mine (Ukrainian: Шахта імені В. М. Бажанова) is a large coal mine located in southeastern Ukraine in Donetsk Oblast, in the industrial city of Makiivka. Bazhanov mine represents one of the largest coal reserve in Ukraine having estimated reserves of 58.7 million tonnes of coal. The annual coal production is around 1.02 million tonnes.

== July 2011 mining accident ==
On 29 July 2011, an elevator collapse killed 11 miners and seriously injured four others. Hundreds of workers were evacuated from other areas of the mine. The president of Ukraine ordered a government investigation. Ukraine's prime minister attributed the accident to "negligence" and estimated that it would take 16 months to repair damage to the mine. Earlier that same day, Ukraine had experienced another fatal coal mining accident due to an explosion in the Suhodolskaya-Vostochnaya coal mine.

== See also ==
- FC Shakhtar Makiivka
- Coal in Ukraine
- List of mines in Ukraine
