= Zhovtnevyi Rudnyk coal mine =

Coal mine located in Donetsk, Ukraine

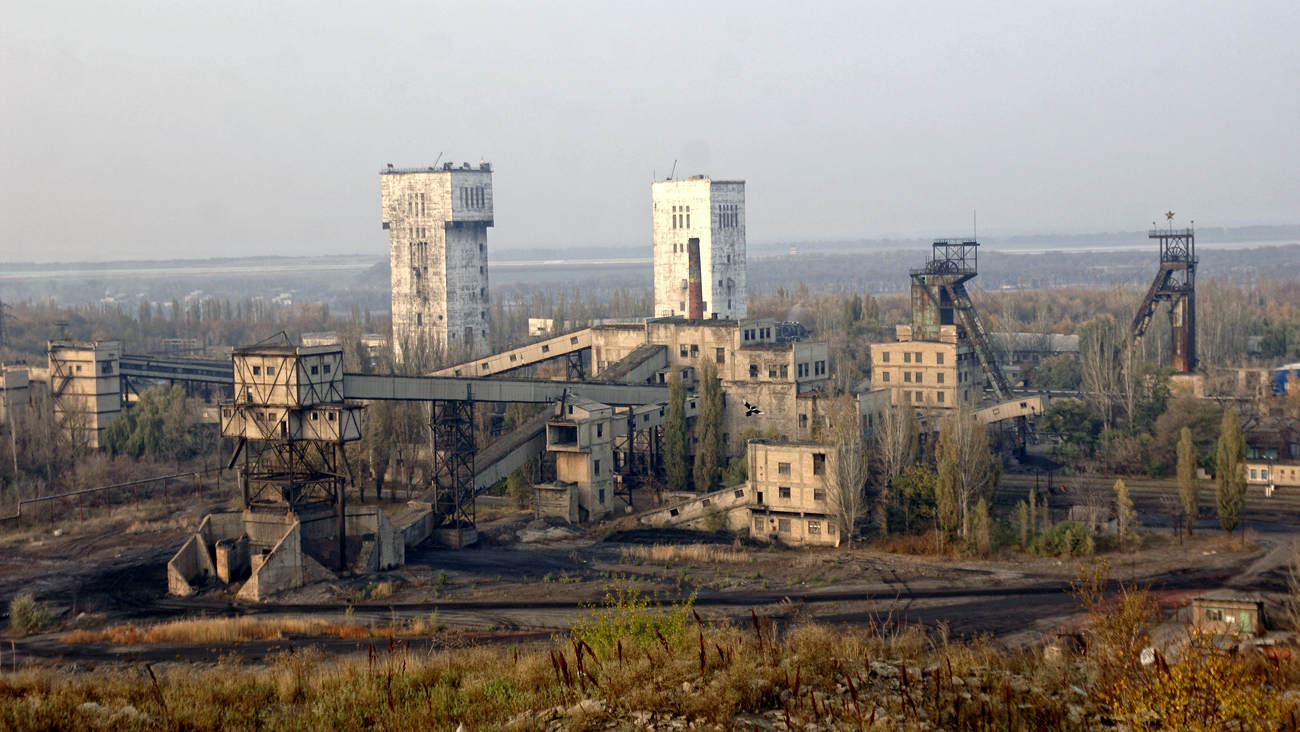
- The mine in 2011
- Location: Donetsk, Donetsk Oblast, Ukraine
- Products: Coal
- Production: 805,000
- Opened: 1975

The Zhovtnevyi Rudnyk coal mine (Ukrainian: Шахта «Жовтневий рудник») is a large coal mine located in the southeast of Ukraine in Donetsk Oblast. Zhovtnevyi Rudnyk represents one of the largest coal reserves in Ukraine having estimated reserves of 97.5 million tonnes. The annual coal production is around 805,000 tonnes.

The mine was originally built in 1974, and by 2012 was actively mining at two seams as a subsidiary of the Donetsk Coal Energy Company (DUEK). In 2014, during the War in the Donbas, it was reported by the Ukrainian administration that the mine had been completely flooded during the fighting and that there were no plans for restoration.

== History ==
The mine was built according to a design by Dondiproshakht Institute in December 1974. The initial design capacity was 1.8 million tonnes of coal per year. However, worsening geological conditions made the production capacity taper, and it went down to 800,000 tonnes per year by 1996. Following the collapse of the Soviet Union, the mine became a subsidiary of the Donetsk Coal Energy Company (DUEK) under the Ministry of Coal Industry in Ukraine.

As of 2012, the two seams being actively mined are 18 "Sofia" and k8 "Parovochny". In December 2012, it was approved by the State Property Fund to sell PAT "Shakhtoupravlinnia Donbas" (which includes the mine) to a buyer. At the time of the prospective selling, the mine was profitable as it cost 760 hryvnias per tonne of coal but could make 900 hryvnias when sold per tonne. In December 2013, the Ministry of Energy and Coal Industry issued an order to write off state property from the balance sheet of the mine.

== Incidents ==
The mine has been classified as a super-category for gas and dangers for dust explosions. Most seams were assessed as having the threat of sudden coal and gas outbursts.

In August 2014, during the ongoing War in the Donbas, the mine was reported to be flooding and only operating on ventilation and water pumping mode. In September 2014, the Donetsk Oblast State Administration said the mine had been flooded, and there were no plans of restoration.

== See also ==
- Coal in Ukraine
- List of mines in Ukraine
