= Faschivska coal mine =

Coal mine in Luhansk, Ukraine

- Location: Faschivka, Luhansk, Ukraine
- Products: Coal
- Production: 285,000
- Opened: 1949
- Closed: 2023
- Company: Luhanskvuhillya

The Faschivska coal mine (Ukrainian: Шахта «Фащівська») was a large coal mine located in the south-east of Ukraine in Luhansk Oblast. It is situated near the settlement of Faschivska. The mine represents one of the largest coal reserves in Ukraine, having estimated reserves of 12.9 million tonnes. The annual coal production was around 285,000 tonnes prior to 2014.

Originally part of the Ukrainian state enterprise "Luhanskvuhillya" (Луганськвугілля), the mine became controlled by pro-Russian separatists in 2014 during the War in the Donbas and was subsequently annexed into the pro-Russian, self-declared Luhansk People's Republic (LPR). Due to significant damage during the war, the mine stopped operations from 2014 to 2016. It then operated from 2016 until 2023, when Russian authorities, following the LPR's annexation by Russia, liquidated the mine.

== History ==
The mine became a subsidiary of the Ukrainian state enterprise "Luhanskvuhillya" (Луганськвугілля) following the collapse of the Soviet Union in 1991. In 2006, the Ukrainian Ministry of Coal Industry ordered the transfer of the mine's social infrastructure (including its residential buildings and other housing) to the communal ownership of the Fashivka settlement council. In 2012, the mine was included on a list by the Ukrainian Cabinet of Ministers for assets eligible for concession. It was also included in the State Property Fund in 2014 for a list of mines that were intended to be privatised.

=== War in the Donbas ===
In 2014, the mine ran through the front lines of the War in the Donbas, leading to the suspension of operations in August 2014. The facility sustained significant damage, including to its drainage, ventilation, and surface hoisting equipment. After intense fighting, the mine was captured by the separatists alongside the Perevalsk Raion, and was subsequently annexed into the pro-Russian, self-declared Luhansk People's Republic (LPR). The mine resumed anthracite production in September 2016, following repairs conducted by the LPR's Ministry of Fuel and Energy and local district authorities. At the time of reopening, the monthly output was expected to be around 3,000 tonnes. Following the highly disputed 2022 annexation referendums in Russian-occupied Ukraine, Russia claimed the city and the mine as part of its territory.

In 2023, Ukrainian sources reported that the mine was liquidated by Russian occupation authorities following the Russian annexation of most of the oblast. It was one of several mining enterprises shut down in Perevalsk Raion under the occupation administration due to unprofitability.

== See also ==
- Coal in Ukraine
- List of mines in Ukraine
