= Sukhodilska–Skhidna coal mine =

Large underground coal mine in Luhansk Oblast, Southeast Ukraine

Coordinates: 48°20′40″N 39°39′30″E

Sukhodilska–Skhidna coal mine Шахта «Суходільська-Східна»
- Interactive map of Sukhodilska–Skhidna coal mine Шахта «Суходільська-Східна»
- Location: Molodohvardiysk, Luhansk Oblast, Ukraine
- Products: Coal
- Production: 712,000 tonnes
- Opened: 1980

The Sukhodilska–Skhidna coal mine (Ukrainian: Шахта «Суходільська-Східна») is a large underground coal mine located in Southeast Ukraine in Luhansk Oblast. Sukhodilska–Skhidna coal mine represents one of the largest coal reserves in Ukraine, having estimated reserves of 157.4 million tonnes. The annual coal production is around 712,000 tonnes. Bituminous coal is mined using longwall mining at depths between 785 and 1,028 m.

The mine began operation in 1980. Since 2014, the mine has been occupied by the pro-Russian, self-declared Luhansk People's Republic, which in 2022 was subsequently annexed in a highly controversial referendum into Russia. In 2024, the mine was acquired by the Russian company Donskiye Ugli, and there were soon rumours of the mine shutting down, but in 2026, the lease contract was terminated.

It is also well known for its mining accidents, with over 100 deaths being recorded in the first 31 years in operation, including a 1992 accident that killed 63 miners. The most well-known accident to happen was in 2011, when a methane outburst killed 26 and sparked a governmental commission by the president.

== History ==
In 2014, the mine was seized by pro-Russian separatists, who annexed the mine into the pro-Russian, self-declared Luhansk People's Republic. In 2022, Russia formally annexed the LPR following a highly controversial referendum that is not internationally recognised. In spring 2024, Russian investors took over the majority of the mines in Luhansk Oblast.

The mine was among the three mines in 2024 that were acquired by the Russian company Donskiye Ugli as one of the most promising mines in the occupied territories. There was discussion by the new owners soon afterwards to keep the mine operational, but reaching profitability was expected to require investment of 4-5 billion rubles in new tunnelling. By late 2025, the mine was the last operating coal mine within Krasnodon, but was said to be preparing for closure by the occupation authorities. In February 2026, the authorities announced the termination of Donskiye Ugli's lease.

== Mining accidents ==
The mine is considered one of the most dangerous in Ukraine because of methane outbursts. Mykhailo Volynets, the head of the Independent Trade Union of Miners, called the Sukhodilska–Skhidna coal mine "one of the most dangerous in Ukraine" due to buildups of methane and coal dust. There is a sign outside the mine that says, "You work in a particularly dangerous production."

The first significant accident was in June 1992, when an explosion of methane and coal dust killed 63 miners. In total, over its first 31 years in operation, more than 100 people were killed. A 2006 explosion also killed 8 miners. Significant fires happened in 2008, which partially flooded the area of the 13th eastern conveyor drift, and in 2023, which broke out on a conveyor incline.

== July 2011 mining accident ==
Shortly before 2 a.m. on 29 July 2011 an explosion occurred 3,000 feet (910 meters) underground in the mine. Initial reports indicated that at least 17 people were killed, and nine others were missing, but later all 26 were reported to have died. Families of the deceased each received one million hryvnias in compensation.

Investigators suspect the accident was caused by a powerful explosion of methane. The then President of Ukraine, Viktor Yanukovych, ordered the government to set up a commission to investigate the accident. The commission subsequently identified violations of the Law on Labour Protection, the Safety Rules in Coal Mines, and the Unified Safety Rules. The mine director, director of occupational safety, as well as other senior figures from the mine and the parent company Krasnodonvuhillia, were found responsible. A total of six employees that worked directly at the mine were dismissed. The cause established by the commission was an explosion of a methane-air mixture.

Later that same day, Ukraine experienced a second fatal coal-mining accident when an elevator collapsed at the Bazhanov coal mine.

== See also ==
- Coal in Ukraine
- List of mines in Ukraine
