= Skochinsky coal mine =

Coal mine in Donetsk, Ukraine

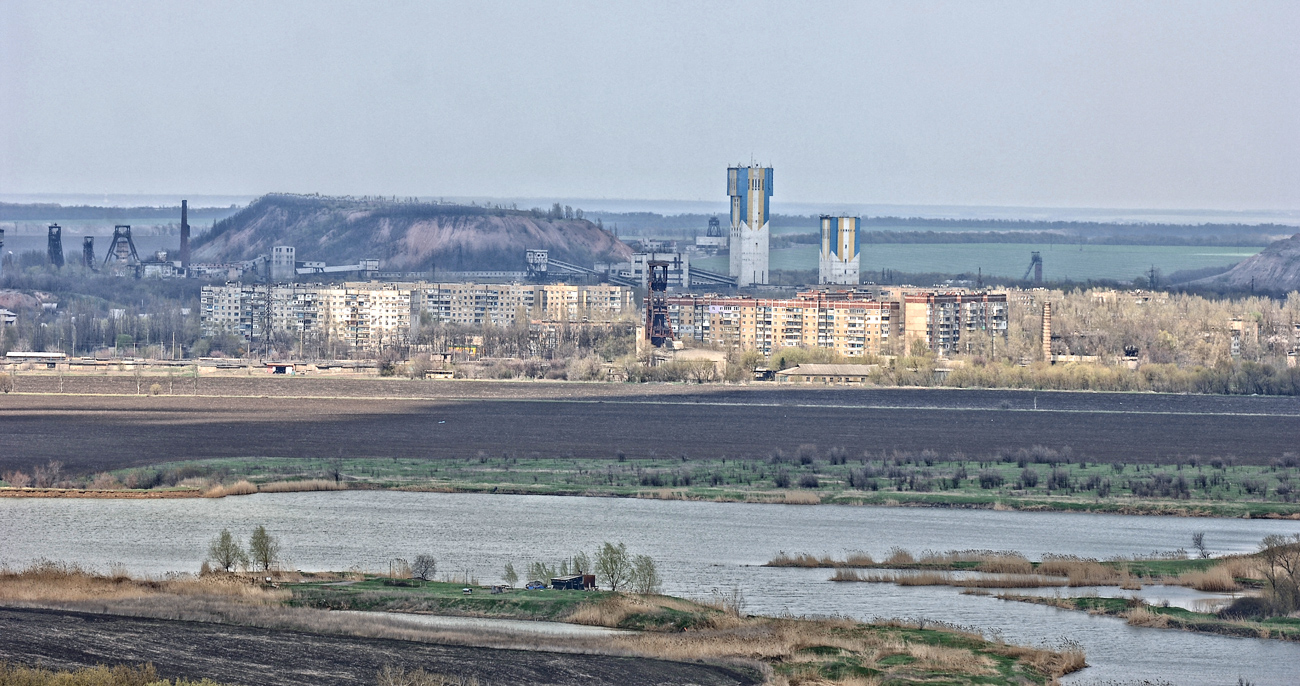
- The mine in 2011
- Interactive map of Skochinsky coal mine
- Location: Donetsk, Donetsk Oblast, Ukraine; 47.992°N 37.640°E
- Products: Coal
- Production: 776,000
- Opened: 1975
- Closed: 2023

The Skochinsky coal mine (Ukrainian: Шахта імені О. О. Скочинського, Russian: Шахта имени академика А. А. Скочинского, A.A. Skochinsky Mine) was a large coal mine located in the city of Donetsk, in the south-east of Ukraine. However, since 2014, it has been occupied by the Donetsk People's Republic and remains de facto part of its territory. It is named after Alexander A. Skochinsky (Александр Александрович Скочинский, 1874–1960), a Soviet mining engineer and researcher.

The Skochinsky Mine represents one of the largest coal reserves in Ukraine, having estimated reserves of 144.4 million tonnes. The annual coal production is around 776,000 tonnes. Skochinsky Mine was one of the deepest coal mines in the country, where mining is carried out at the depths of up to 1200–1450 m. It was reported in 2023 that the mine was closed by the Russian authorities following the annexation of the DPR in 2022.

== History ==
The mine was put into operation on 29 April 1975, and upon opening was the deepest mine in the USSR, reaching a depth of 1,200 metres. Following the collapse of the Soviet Union, the mine came under the state enterprise AUU "Donetskvuhillia" until 1992, when it was moved to the State Property Fund of Ukraine to be used as a lease enterprise. It then came under the Donetsk Coal Energy Company, which is owned by politician Yukhym Zvyahilsky, who was previously the mine's director until 1992.

Since 2014, the mine has been occupied by pro-Russian separatists, who annexed the territory into the pro-Russian, self-declared Donetsk People's Republic. In early 2023, it was reported that the mine was shelled by cluster munitions, which targeted the administrative buildings. This was reported by Russian-backed sources from the de facto Mayor of Donetsk, Alexey Kulemzin. In January 2023, the mine was closed by Russian authorities, alongside a number of other mines. This was attributed to the mines' unprofitability, a shortage of miners, and the inability to update equipment.

== Mining accidents ==
It is classified as a dangerous mine due to its frequent sudden outbursts and has had mine accidents. The largest recorded accident was on the night of 4 April 1998, when a methane at the explosion killed 63 miners and left more than 50 other miners injured. A few years later, in 2001, 6 more miners died due to a sudden release of a mixture, and 2 more died in 2009 after another sudden release.

In April 2014, another gas release happened, which severely injured 7 miners but did not kill them. The most recent accident was in November 2020 due to the conveyor drift, with 26 miners being stuck underground. Four of the miners stuck were later found dead.

== See also ==
- Coal in Ukraine
- List of mines in Ukraine
