= Berehove mine =

Location
- Location: Zakarpattia Oblast, Ukraine

Production
- Products: Gold, silver, lead, zinc

The Berehove mine is one of the largest gold mines in Ukraine and in the world. The mine is located in the south-west of the country in Zakarpattia Oblast. The mine has estimated reserves of 14.4 million oz of gold and 144 million oz of silver. The mine also has ore reserves amounting to 300 million tonnes grading 1.5% lead and 2.1% zinc.
