= Byk (river) =

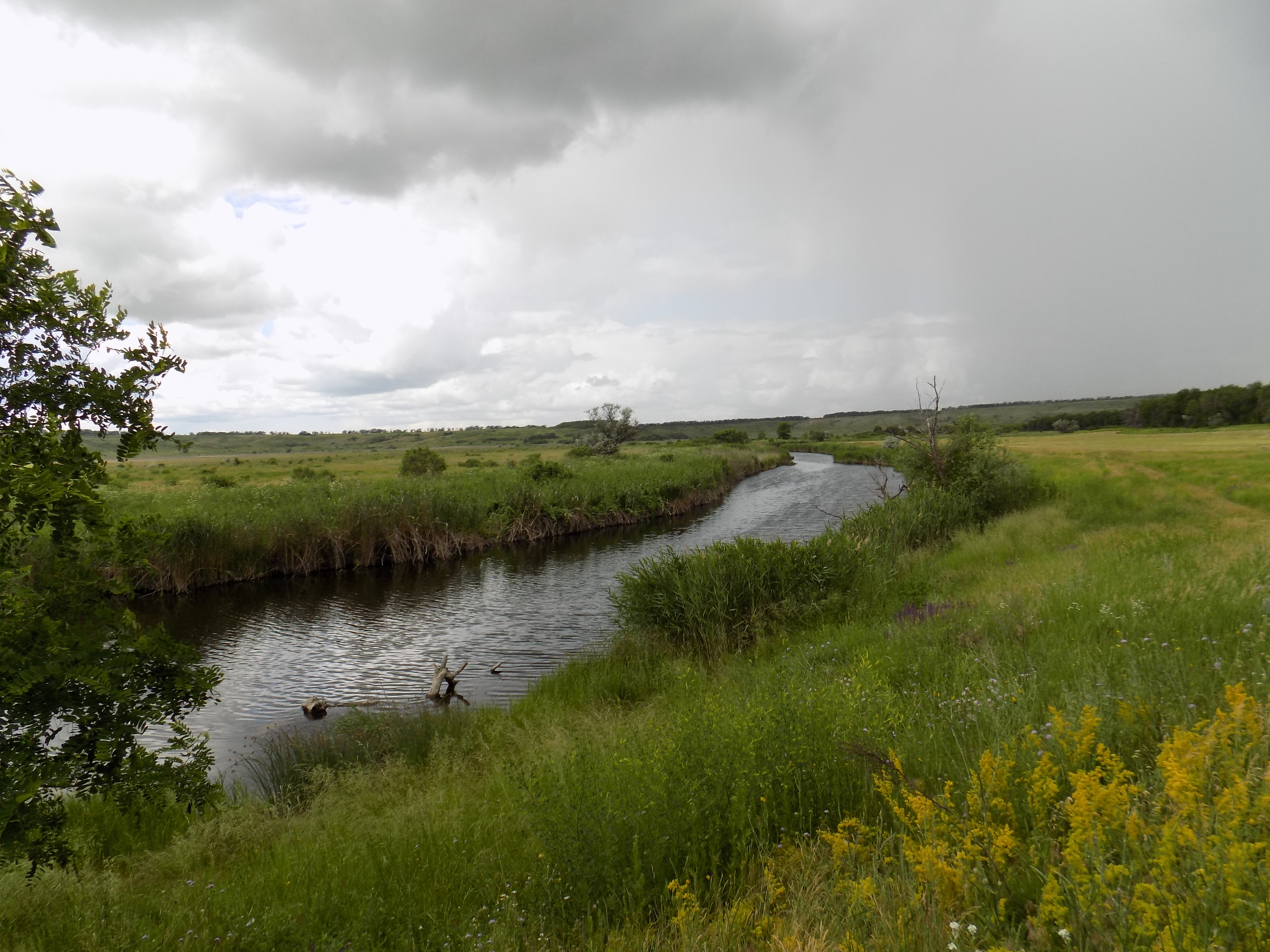

Location
- Country: Ukraine

Physical characteristics
- Mouth: Samara
  - coordinates: 48°27′08″N 36°23′04″E

Basin features
- Progression: Samara→ Dnieper→ Dnieper–Bug estuary→ Black Sea

The Byk is a river in Ukraine, a tributary of the Samara.
