= Coal in Ukraine =

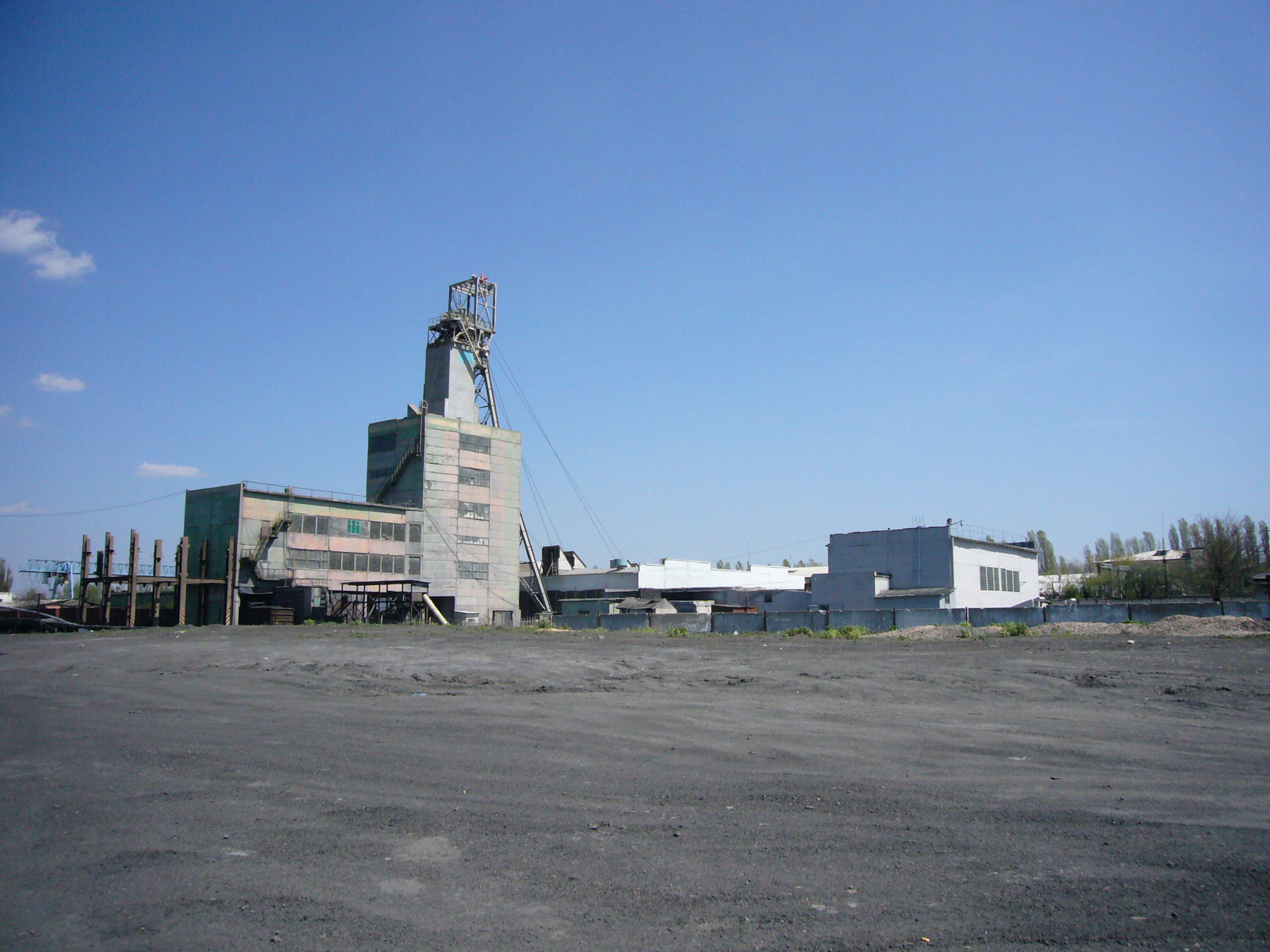
Samarska Coal Mine, near Ternivka

Coal mining has historically been an important industry in Ukraine. Although the industry is often associated with the coal-rich Donets basin in the east of the country, other coal mining regions include the Lviv-Volhynian basin and the Dnieper brown coal mining basin. The Donets basin is Ukraine's most developed and largest coal mining region.

In 2013, Ukraine was the third largest coal producer in Europe. In 1976, national production was 218 million metric tonnes. By 2016, production had dropped to 41 million metric tonnes. The Donets Black Coal Basin in eastern Ukraine, with 90% of the nation's reserves, suffers from three connected problems: (1) mines are not profitable enough to sustain capital investment, resulting in aging mining equipment and processes, (2) the government, taking advice from the International Monetary Fund, has discontinued $600 million annual mining subsidies, and (3) the Ukrainian government refuses to buy from mines controlled by Russia.

== History ==
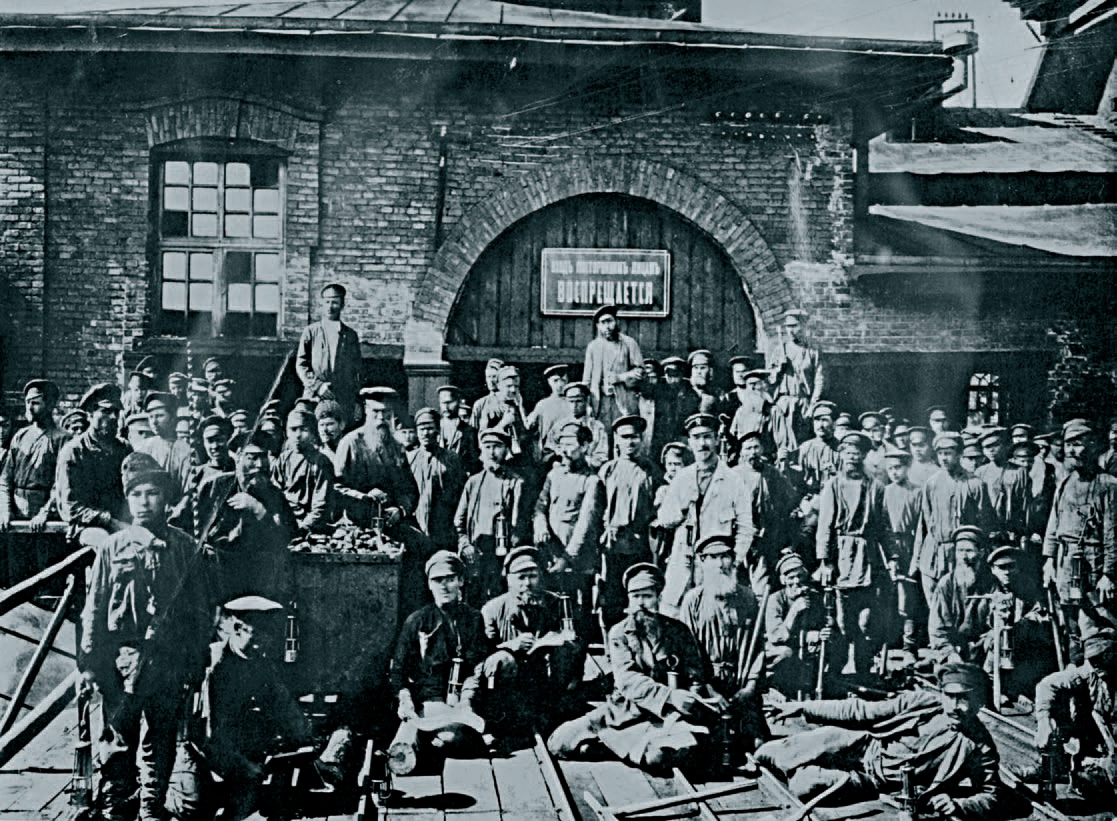
Mine in Lysychansk (late 19th century)

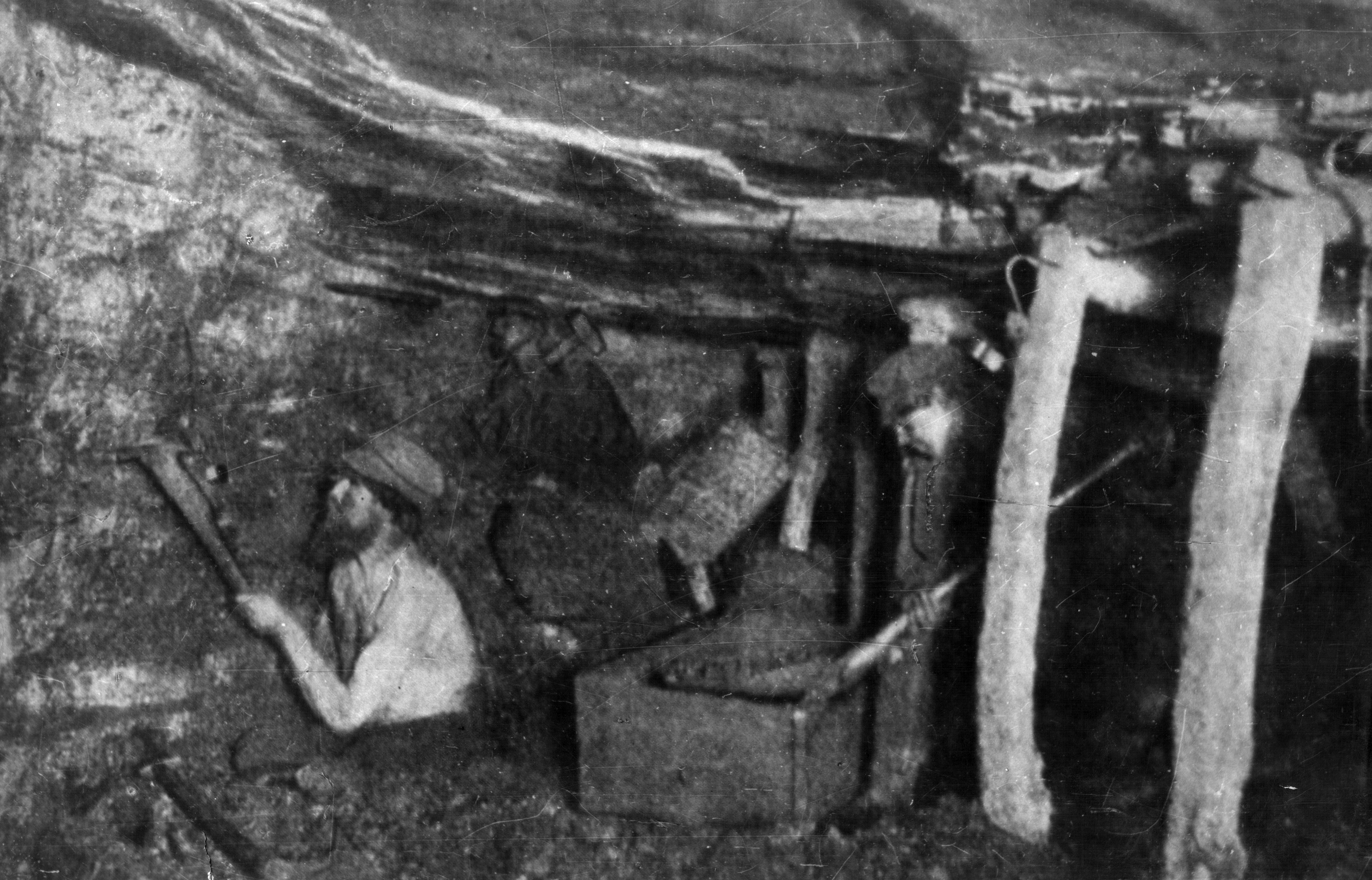
An early 20th century photograph of a pit in the Donbass

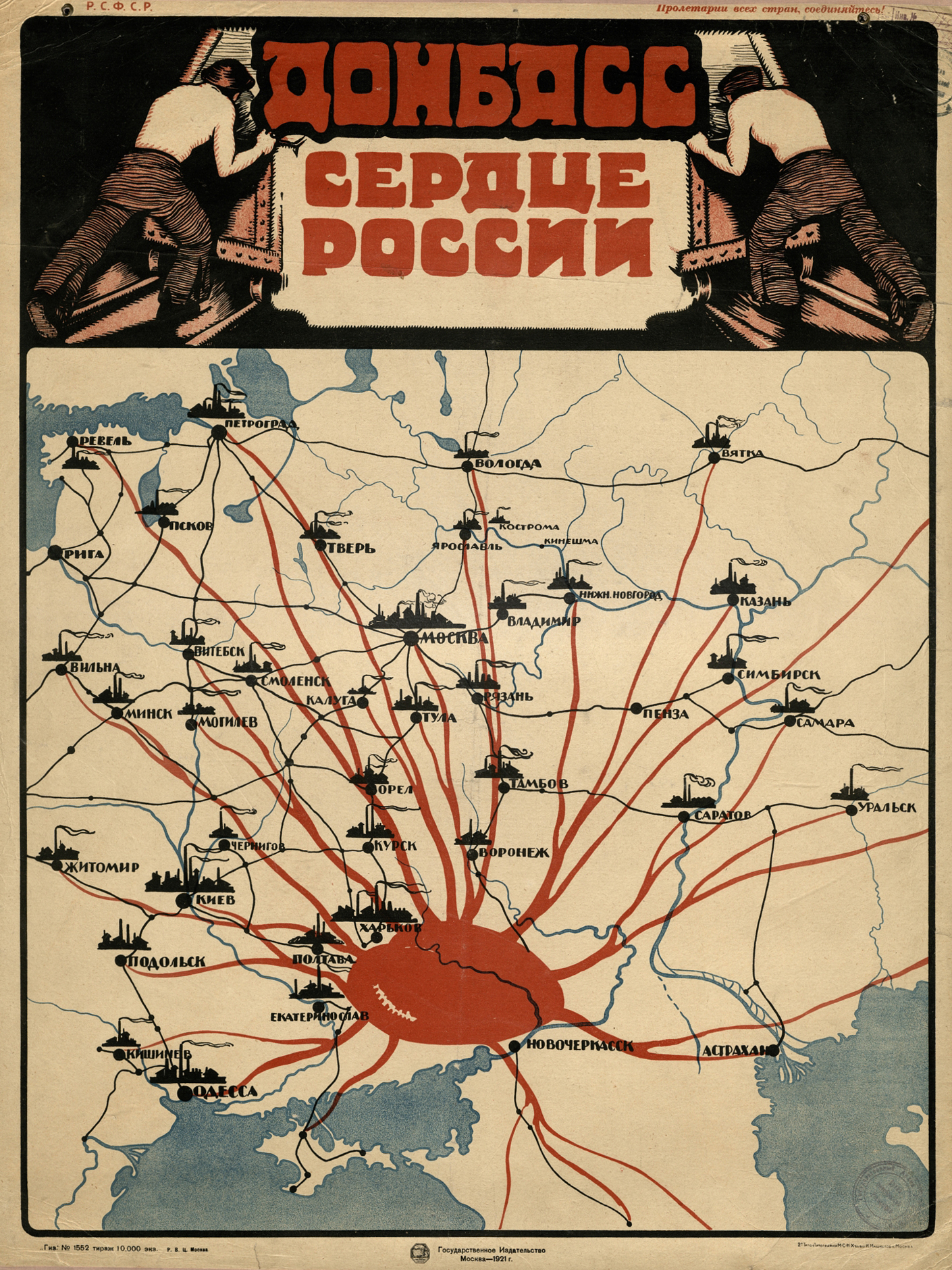
A 1921 Russian poster, with the caption Donbass is the heart of Russia

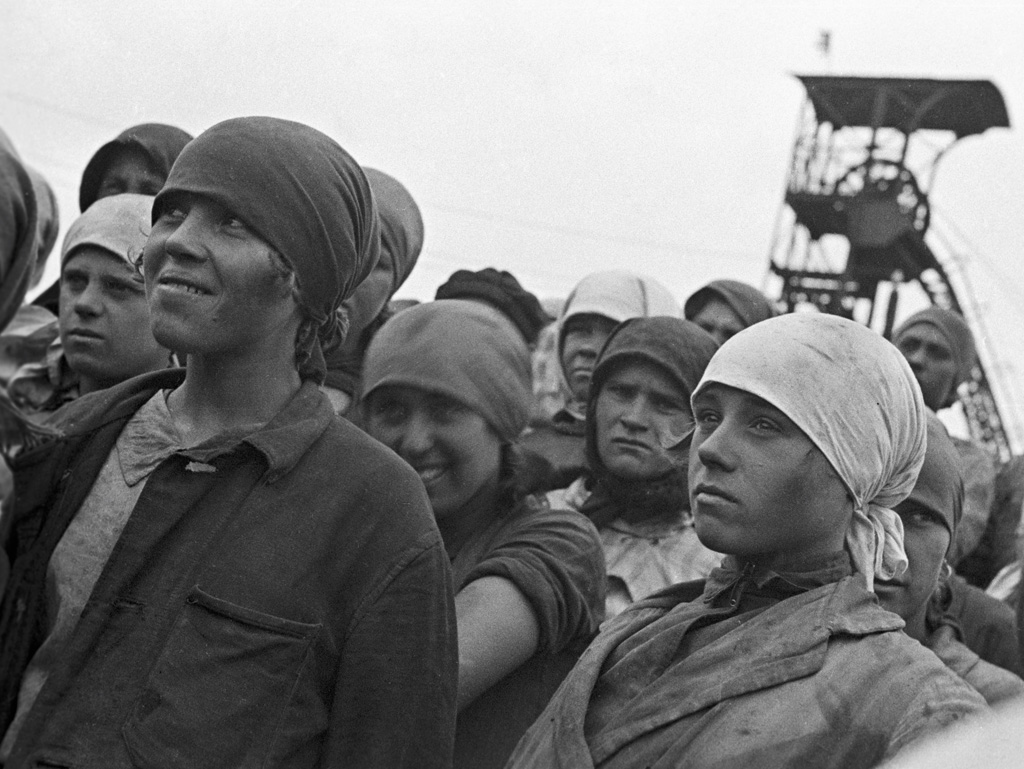
Young girls arrive at the mines in Horlivka under the Komsomol appeal on 16 September 1930

Coal mining has historically been an important industry in Ukraine. Coal production in Ukraine first began during the late 18th century and achieved industrial proportions in the 1870s. In 1913, the territory of modern Ukraine produced 78,5% of the Russian Empire's coal. In the USSR Soviet Ukraine produced 50% of the metallurgical coal, but the share of its share of production decreased with time due to the discovery of new sources of coal in other regions.

Starting from 1904, major private producers of coal in the Donets basin were united into a syndicate, which was later nationalized by the Bolsheviks and subjected to the Supreme Economic Council In 1932 coal industry was turned into a sphere of responsibility of the People's Commissariat of Fuel Industry, and in 1939 the all-Union Ministry of Coal Industry was created. In 1954 a separate Ministry of Coal Industry of Ukrainian SSR was established with its seat in Stalino, however the planning of coal production continued to be performed by the all-Union Gosplan agency. Separate coal mines were united into trusts, which in their turn merged into combines.

Before World War II, Donbas coal had been exported mainly to other parts of the Russian Empire and Soviet Union. Following the war, coal exports from Ukraine to Soviet satellite states started. Inside of Ukraine itself, coal was mainly used by the metal industry, as well as power plants and railway transport. Due to the declining quality of newly exploited coal layers, the role of coal preparation plants increased.

By 2013, Ukraine had become the third largest coal producer in Europe. In March 2017, the Ukrainian president Petro Poroshenko signed a decree that banned the movement of goods to and from territories controlled by the self-proclaimed Donetsk People's Republic and Luhansk People's Republic, which stopped coal from those areas being used in the rest of the country.

A 1996 World Bank report estimated Ukraine's coal reserves at 52 billion tonnes, of which 23 billion were proven and probable, and 10 billion tonnes were deemed economically extractable. It added: "Ukraine has practically unlimited supply of coal. However, a large portion of the reserves appear to be uneconomic. The geological reasons for the high costs and the low productivity are great depth, high temperature, frequent gas outbursts and thin coal seams." In 2013, according to the Ukrainian mining trade union, coal constituted 95% of Ukraine's domestic energy resources. As of 2022, Ukraine had the sixth-largest coal reserves in the world.

It has been calculated that 90 percent of Ukraine's coal reserves are located in the Donets Coalfield in the east of the country. Other Ukrainian coalfields include the Lviv-Volhynian Coalfield, between Lviv and Volodymyr, and the Dnieper Coalfield in central Ukraine, where lignite (brown coal) was mined until the 1990s.

== Coal mining ==
Coal production in Ukraine 1860–2019, million tonnes (Mt)
| Year | 1860 | 1861 | 1862 | 1863 | 1864 | 1865 | 1866 | 1867 | 1868 | 1869 |
|---|---|---|---|---|---|---|---|---|---|---|
| Coal (Mt) | na | 0.1↑ | na | na | na | na | na | na | na | na |
| Year | 1870 | 1871 | 1872 | 1873 | 1874 | 1875 | 1876 | 1877 | 1878 | 1879 |
| Coal (Mt) | na | na | na | na | na | na | na | na | na | na |
| Year | 1880 | 1881 | 1882 | 1883 | 1884 | 1885 | 1886 | 1887 | 1888 | 1889 |
| Coal (Mt) | 1.3↑ | 1.4↑ | 1.6↑ | 1.6↑ | na | na | na | na | na | na |
| Year | 1890 | 1891 | 1892 | 1893 | 1894 | 1895 | 1896 | 1897 | 1898 | 1899 |
| Coal (Mt) | 2.9↑ | na | na | na | na | na | na | na | na | na |
| Year | 1900 | 1901 | 1902 | 1903 | 1904 | 1905 | 1906 | 1907 | 1908 | 1909 |
| Coal (Mt) | 11.3↑ | na | na | na | na | na | na | na | na | na |
| Year | 1910 | 1911 | 1912 | 1913 | 1914 | 1915 | 1916 | 1917 | 1918 | 1919 |
| Coal (Mt) | 16.3↑ | na | na | 22.5↑ | 24.0↑ | 23.0↓ | 24.5↑ | 22.0↓ | 6.3↓ | 4.5↓ |
| Year | 1920 | 1921 | 1922 | 1923 | 1924 | 1925 | 1926 | 1927 | 1928 | 1929 |
| Coal (Mt) | 4.0↓ | 4.0↓ | 6.0↑ | 7.0↑ | 11.3↑ | 11.3↑ | 18.3↑ | 22.0↑ | 22.5↑ | 25.0↑ |
| Year | 1930 | 1931 | 1932 | 1933 | 1934 | 1935 | 1936 | 1937 | 1938 | 1939 |
| Coal (Mt) | 33.0↑ | 36.7↑ | 41.2↑ | 44.0↑ | 53.0↑ | 59.8↑ | 67.0↑ | 67.2↑ | 69.3↑ | 70.9↑ |
| Year | 1940 | 1941 | 1942 | 1943 | 1944 | 1945 | 1946 | 1947 | 1948 | 1949 |
| Coal (Mt) | 76.2↑ | 57.2↓ | 2.2↓ | 2.6↑ | 16.3↑ | 30.3↑ | 37.5↑ | 45.0↑ | 54.9↑ | 65.0↑ |
| Year | 1950 | 1951 | 1952 | 1953 | 1954 | 1955 | 1956 | 1957 | 1958 | 1959 |
| Coal (Mt) | 78.0↑ | 81.2↑ | 88.8↑ | 95.6↑ | 104.6↑ | 120.3↑ | 132.6↑ | 152.1↑ | 164.2↑ | 167.3↑ |
| Year | 1960 | 1961 | 1962 | 1963 | 1964 | 1965 | 1966 | 1967 | 1968 | 1969 |
| Coal (Mt) | 172.1↑ | 171.4↓ | 175.1↑ | 179.7↑ | 187.1↑ | 194.3↑ | 196.4↑ | 199.0↑ | 200.4↑ | 204.4↑ |
| Year | 1970 | 1971 | 1972 | 1973 | 1974 | 1975 | 1976 | 1977 | 1978 | 1979 |
| Coal (Mt) | 207.1↑ | 209.4↑ | 211.2↑ | 212.6↑ | 213.7↑ | 215.7↑ | 218.2↑ | 217.1↓ | 210.9↓ | 204.7↓ |
| Year | 1980 | 1981 | 1982 | 1983 | 1984 | 1985 | 1986 | 1987 | 1988 | 1989 |
| Coal (Mt) | 197.1↓ | 191.1↓ | 194.1↑ | 190.9↓ | 190.8↓ | 189.0↓ | 193.0↑ | 192.0↓ | 191.7↓ | 180.2↓ |
| Year | 1990 | 1991 | 1992 | 1993 | 1994 | 1995 | 1996 | 1997 | 1998 | 1999 |
| Coal (Mt) | 164.8↓ | 135.6↓ | 133.6↓ | 115.7↓ | 94.4↓ | 83.6↓ | 74.8↓ | 75.6↑ | 76.2↑ | 81.1↑ |
| Year | 2000 | 2001 | 2002 | 2003 | 2004 | 2005 | 2006 | 2007 | 2008 | 2009 |
| Coal (Mt) | 80.3↓ | 83.4↑ | 81.9↓ | 79.3↓ | 80.2↑ | 78.0↓ | 80.3↑ | 75.5↓ | 77.7↑ | 72.2↓ |
| Year | 2010 | 2011 | 2012 | 2013 | 2014* | 2015* | 2016* | 2017* | 2018* | 2019* |
| Coal (Mt) | 75.2↑ | 81.9↑ | 85.7↑ | 83.7↓ | 64.9↓ | 39.7↓ | 40.9↑ | 34.9↓ | 33.3↓ | 31.2↓ |
| Year | 2020* | 2021* | 2022* | 2023* | 2024* | 2025* | 2026 | 2027 | 2028 | 2029 |
| Coal (Mt) | 28.8↓ | 29.4↑ | na | na | 22.9↓ | 15↓ | | | | |

n.b.: Number after 2014 do not include extraction in the territory occupied by the separatists and Russia.

Coal production in Ukraine, 1880-2025 (in million tonnes)

In July 2014, several mines were closed in Eastern Ukraine because of the war in Donbas. The war in Donbass caused coal production in Ukraine to decrease by 22.4% of its 2013 value, to 64.976 million tonnes. As a result, Ukraine begun importing coal from South Africa and Russia. A lack of coal for Ukraine's coal-fired power stations and a shutdown of one of the six reactors of the Zaporizhzhia Nuclear Power Plant lead to rolling power outages throughout the country throughout December 2014.

== Consumption, import and export ==
Coal consumption in 2012 grew to 61.207 million tonnes, up 6.2% compared with 2011. Most was used for public utilities and for power generation. However, local coal only provided 50% of the country's electricity needs, therefore requiring Ukraine to import from Russia and Poland.

As of 2013, the Ukrainian government planned to completely replace the natural gas used in the steel industry and some other economic sectors with coal.

Coal powered 38% of Ukrainian electrical generation in 2014. The relative cost of domestic coal versus imported coal, nuclear and gas, made it unworkable. In 2016, the nation imported 15.648 million tonnes of coal and anthracite worth of $1.467 billion. In the year before the start of the Russo-Ukrainian War, 2013, Ukraine exported 500 thousand tonnes and imported 25 million tonnes. In 2016, Ukraine exported 520,585 tonnes of coal and anthracite worth of $44.762 million.

In 2019, Ukraine produced the highest amount of PM_{10} particulates and sulfur dioxide air pollution emissions in Europe from coal-fired electricity generation. None of Ukraine's power plants have desulfurization equipment other than a small trial plant on unit 2 of Trypilska thermal power plant.

In June 2020, the Government of Ukraine prioritized the usage of coal at Ukrainian power stations to reduce the import of natural gas used at the power stations for electricity production.

== Mine safety ==
Mine safety is the result of geology and human factors. The geology of Ukrainian coal mines is not favorable: seam thickness is small, seams are deep, and methane is common. The coal mines of Donbas are one of the most hazardous in the world due to enormous working depths (down from 300 to 1200 m) as a result of natural depletion, as well as due to high levels of methane explosion, coal dust explosion and rock burst dangers. As the Economic Review points out, "Since 1991, up to 300 [miners] have died at work every year".

Low profitability of Ukrainian mines has not attracted capital investment. As a result, the machinery and the processes used to dig coal are twenty years old. These methods are less safe on a per-miner basis and require more miners.

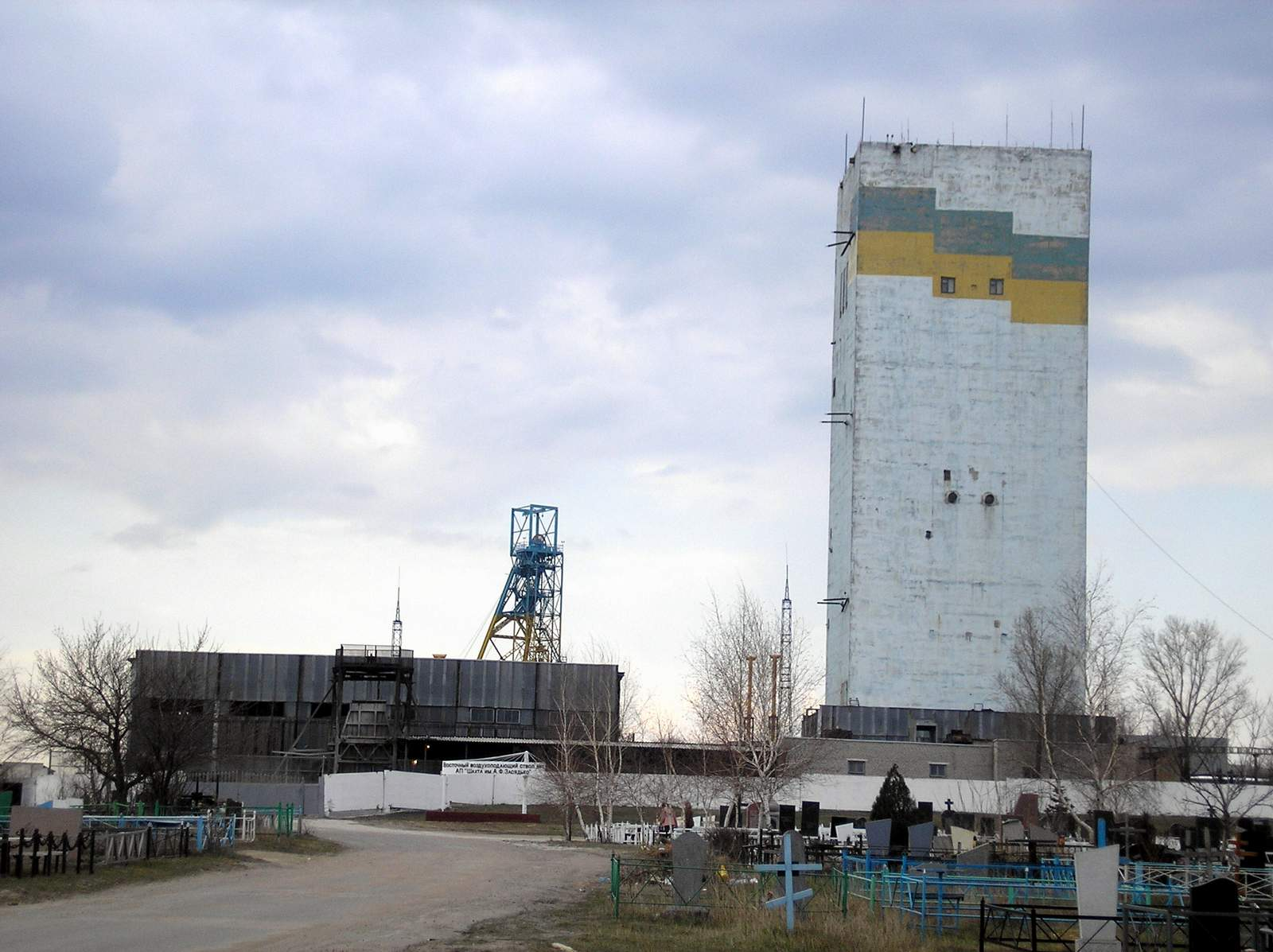
The shaft of the Zasiadko coal mine

The Zasiadko mine stands as an example of Donbass mine safety. It was opened in 1958 and privatized in 1992, since which time it has had seven major accidents, including the 2007 Zasiadko mine disaster (101 workers killed) and the 2015 Zasiadko mine disaster (17 killed).

== Corruption and illegal mining ==
Ukrainian mines are sometimes run by mafia-like organizations. Often, these organizations derive large incomes from the mines that belong to the government. As a result, underfinancing causes many employees to have to wait to receive their monthly salary for weeks or even months. Additionally, a lack of financing influences the condition of many coal mines. Old mines don't receive the necessary financial aid, therefore they are not being renovated or remodeled annually. All these problems together with other challenges have resulted in "gradually declining production capacity and a loss of global market share".

In the Donets Basin there are many extremely dangerous illegal mines.

== See also ==
- Energy in Ukraine
