= Viktor Nusenkis =

Russian-Ukrainian businessman (born 1954)

- Віктор Нусенкіс
- Born: 3 March 1954 (age 72); Stalino, Ukrainian SSR, Soviet Union
- Education: Donetsk National Technical University
- Occupation: Businessman
- Known for: Co-owner and chairman of Energo, founder of Donetskstal group

Viktor Leonidovych Nusenkis (Ukrainian: Віктор Леонідович Нусенкіс; Russian: Виктор Леонидович Нусенкис; born 3 March 1954) is a Russian-Ukrainian oligarch and businessman. He is the co-owner and chairman of Energo, a coal trading company in Ukraine, alongside Leonid Baysarov and Hennadiy Vasilyev. Nusenkis also acquired the Donetsk Metallurgical Plant, which he consolidated into "Donetskstal", which owns a number of plants and mines in Ukraine. In Russia, he also owns a number of enterprises under MPO Kuzbass, with its main subsidiary being the Coal Company Zarechnaya. Due to the scale of his holdings, he is considered part of the group of Ukrainian oligarchs, and in 2013 was the 6th richest person in Ukraine. In 2014, during the outbreak of the War in the Donbas, Nusenkis allegedly sided with the pro-Russian Donetsk People's Republic, and continued his enterprises in Donetsk and the Donbas.

== Early life ==
Nusenkis was born on 3 March 1954 in Stalino in the Ukrainian SSR of the Soviet Union (now Donetsk, Ukraine) (Note: Donetsk is claimed by both Russia and Ukraine. As of October 2026, Russia controls the city, but it is internationally recognized as being part of Ukraine.) . He was the son of a worker, Leonid Isaakovich Nusenkis, and a teacher, Bella Markovna Nusenkis. Viktor, in the past, has said he is ethnically a Mariupol Greek, although others have disputed this account and instead called him ethnically an Ashkenazi Jew. He was named Viktor after his original name, over the originally chosen name of Aaron, due to Antisemitism in the Soviet Union, while his last name Nusenkis is a northern Russian surname from the Novgorod and Scandinavia area. After finishing secondary school, he pursued higher education and graduated from the Donetsk National Technical University. He then entered the workforce, working at the Batova mine in Makiivka as a district mine surveyor, assistant section head, and head of a tunnelling section. In the early 1980s, he was noticed by Mykola Surgai, the then first deputy minister of the coal industry for the Ukrainian SSR, who promoted him to chief engineer of that mine.

== Business career ==
=== Initial work in Zhdanivka ===
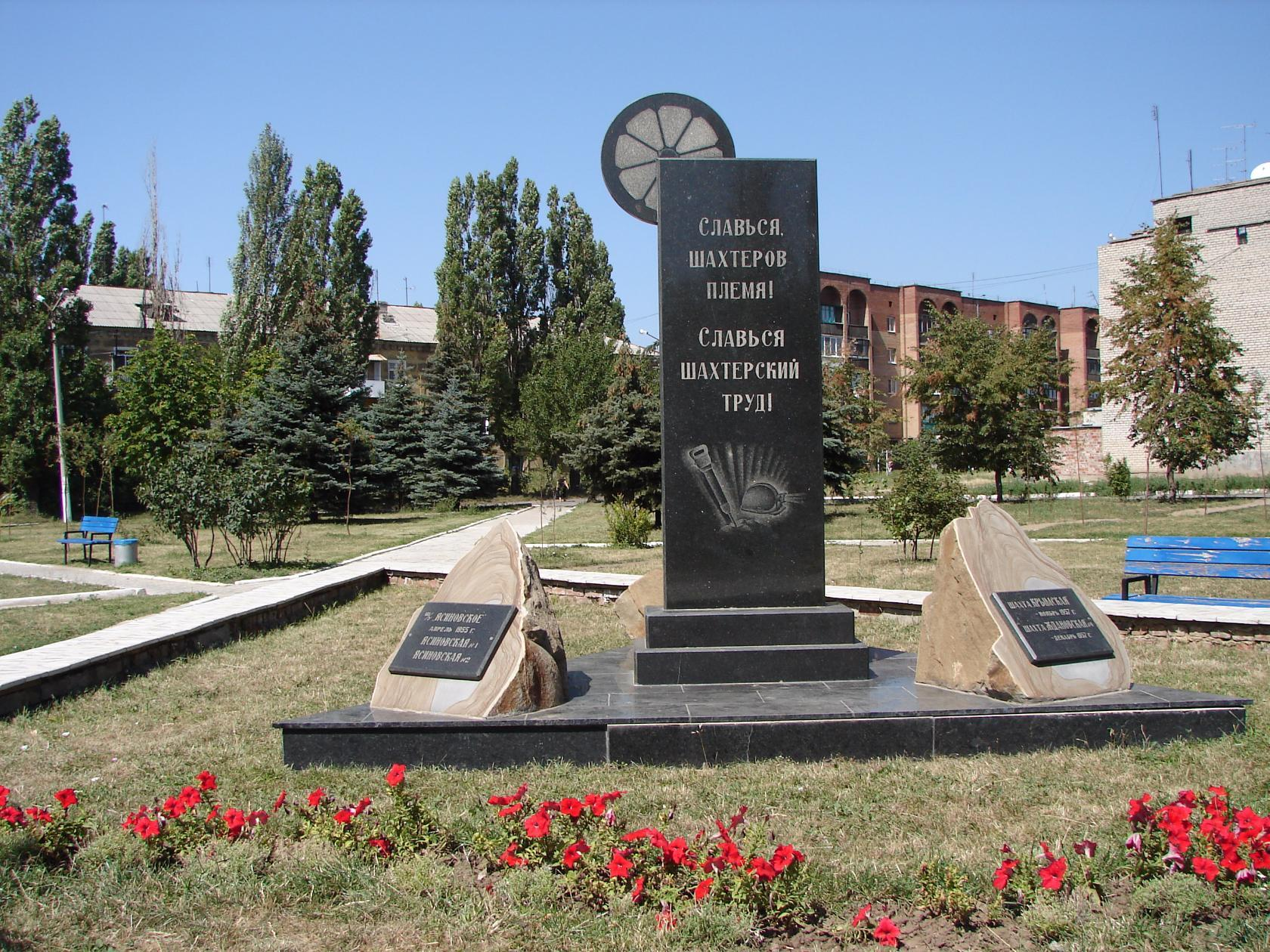
The Monument to the Glory of Miners' Labour in Zhdanivka. During his early career, Nusenkis worked in the city and served as mayor.

In 1985, when he was 31, he was appointed director of the Zhdanivska coal mine in Zhdanivka by Surgai, making him one of the youngest mine directors within the state. During his time at the mine, he nearly doubled the output within three years and began selling its coal directly instead of via Ugolsbyt. At the same time, he was appointed chairman of the Zhdanivka city executive committee (equivalent to mayor), with Nusenkis initially also closing the coal boilers there in favour of gas. In 1987, he founded another venture while retaining the directorship of Zhdanivska and the mayorship, which was called "Gornyak" and transported timber from Siberia in the Russian SFSR to Donetsk Oblast. Volodymyr Shubskikh quickly became his first business partner, with Nusenkis earning 100,000 rubles from "Gornyak" soon after, which he used to buy other companies like an Italian sausage company, a bakery, and a small furniture factory. After the start of the 1990s Donbas miners' strikes, which was part of the wider 1989 Soviet miners' strikes, Nusenkis's mine went on strike, and he responded by removing the mine from Artemugol's control and putting it under state oblast administration. He also initially supported the strikers, but still sold the mine's coal abroad. Although the strikes were still ongoing, Surgai proposed to Nusenkis creating a state-controlled association under the Ministry of Coal, MPO "DON", although it failed due to contracts.

=== Energo ===
The Pokrovske coal mine, which Nusenkis acquired for Energo in 1998 from Leonid Baysarov.

In 1992, Nusenkis reorganised the failed MPO "Don" to create a concern called Energo, which was a firm that arranged with mines and plants to trade coal. Energo only became more prominent in 1993 during the end of the first 1990s Donbas miners' strikes, when it was involved in large deals during hyperinflation although it did not own any assets, such as its own mines, at this point. In the book Donetsk Mafia, Kuzin alleges that during the 1994-96 era Energo operated a scheme under Nusenkis and Yukhym Zvyahilsky in which the company bought coal from small mines for half the price, resold it at markup price, and said it was their own output from mines. Due to new competitors in the field, such as Rinat Akhmetov, Nusenkis decided to acquire assets for Energo, such as the Pokrovske coal mine in 1998, which he bought with profits from trade, the Yasynuvata coke plant, which he bought after repairing a coke battery there, and the Makiivka coke plant, which Nusenkis took over during bankruptcy proceedings. With the purchase of multiple coke plants, Energo was, at the time, the only coke exporter in Ukraine and by far the largest coke producer. In order to make a self-reliant chain for Energo, he also attempted to buy out Kryvorizhstal, and the metallurgical plant in Makiivka, but these attempts failed. During this time, Nusenkis was also joined at Energo by a number of people, including Hennadiy Vasyliev, his key associate, Volodymyr Lohvynenko, who briefly headed Energo in 1994, Leonid Baysarov, who was previously the director of the Pokrovske coal mine, and Konstantinos Papunidis, a Cypriot-Georgian who previously worked at Kredytpromblank and was a trustee of the Energo assets.

In 1998, Energo also expanded into the Russian market, with Nusenkis sending Oleksandr Starikov to negotiate with Leninskugol over the ownership of Coal Company Zarechnaya. In order to do so, Energo invested 300 million rubles a year in Zarechnaya, with Nusenkis also moving to Moscow and obtaining Russian citizenship in 1999 in order to head the Russian market, while Vasyliev and Papunidis were left to head the Ukrainian market. By 2003, Energo controlled the following assets in Ukraine: the concern of Energo, the JV "SAVI", Dutch Indtec Finance B.V., Yasynuvata coke plant, Kredytprombank, Agrofirm Agrotis, the Maryinka feed plant, Regom, Pokrovske coal plant, "Kyivska Rus" shopping centre, Garant Polis, Panteleimonivka refractory plant, and Makiivkoks. The company also owned two mines in Russia, namely in the Kuzbass. In 2008, Energo tried to sell off Kredytprombank to the National Bank of Greece after Société Générale had earlier backed out, but the deal did not close. It was later sold to Mykola Lahun in 2012 for a symbolic amount of $1.

The assets of Energo came into heavy dispute in the early 2010s, when the company built a number of offshore structures in Cyprus, with Papunidis as a trustee. In 2010, Nusenkis filed in Nicosia that he had the right to 100% of these assets, although Vasyliev said in 2011 that he owned 50% of the trusts. By then these assets consisted of 75 Ukrainian, 57 Russian, 23 Cypriot, and 37 other foreign entities. Nusenkis justified his claim by saying that he paid Vasyliev nearly $200 million in the late 1990s, with Papunidis saying that both sides had agreed to equal shares previously. Vasyliev said in 2013 that he had handed Nusenkis assets from the offshore company to manage after he decided to separate from Energo in 2005, but that in 2007 Nusenkis had re-registered the assets to himself. Regardless, in December 2012, Cyprus froze the assets of Energo over the dispute.

=== Donetskstal ===
Donetsk Metallurgical Plant in Donetsk

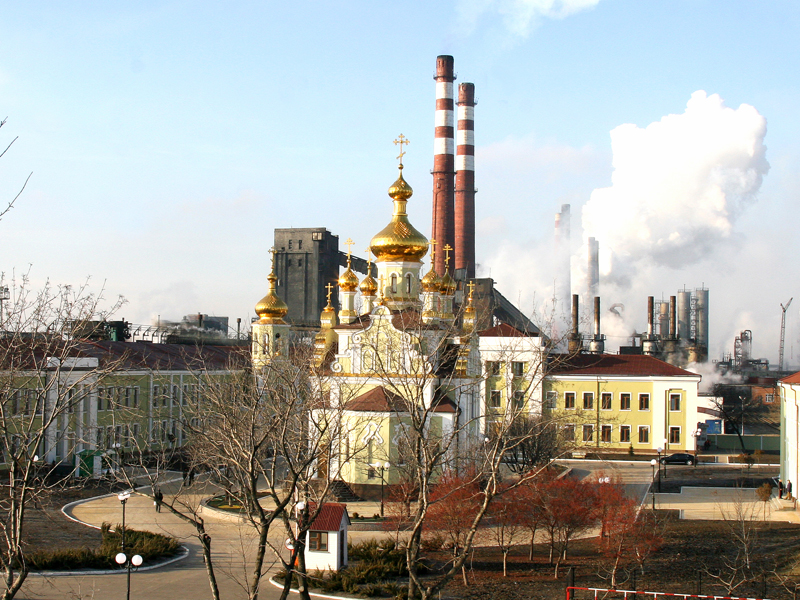
Yasynuvta Coke Plant in Makiivka

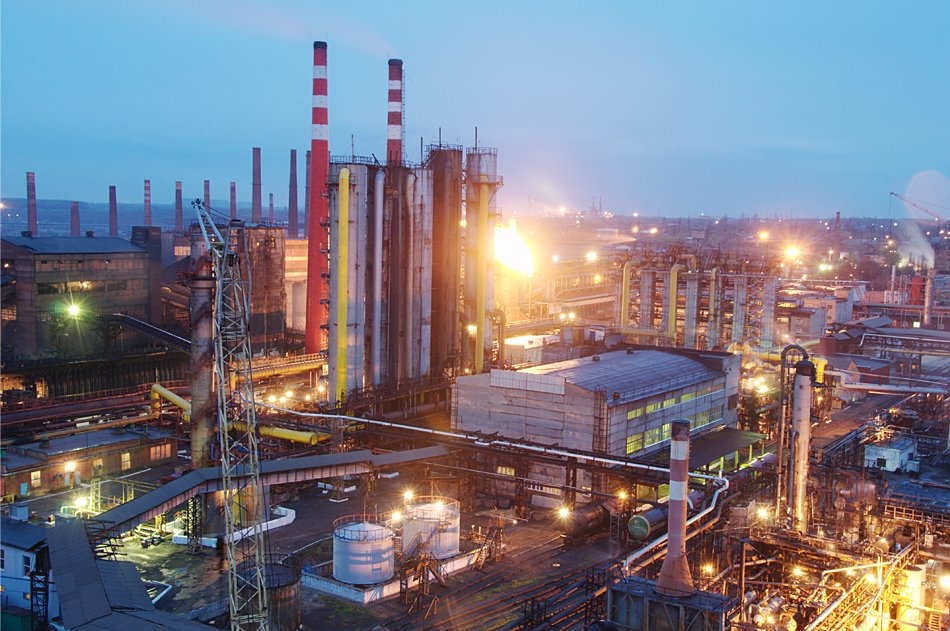
Makiivka Coke Plant in Makiivka

Donetskstal is part of the umbrella company of Energo, and primarily consists of the more industrial assets in Ukraine, although other sources describe Donetskstal as the remnants of Energo. It is also part of the offshore Cypriot Fintest Trading, which is part of Energo also. Nusenkis originally only acquired parts of the Donetsk Metallurgical Plant, but bought it out in 2000 after its debts exceeded $100 million under its previous Pakistani owner Mohammad Zahoor. The metallurgical plant then became part of the newly created Donetskstal as its central asset, while Makiivkoks, Pokrovske coal mine, Yasynuvata coke plant, and the Donetsk Electrotechnical Plant were also brought into Donetskstal's fold. In addition, although not in Ukraine, Nusenkis put the Yurginsky Machine-Building Plant in Russia and T Machineria "S" in the Czech Republic as part of Donetskstal in the 2000s. However, in 2008, Donetskstal's output fell during the 2008 financial crisis, especially at the coke plants and the Pokrovske mine, which led to pig iron production under Donetskstal being temporarily stopped. The downturn in production continued into 2009 when ArcelorMittal canceled its contracts for coke, which led to Donetskstal deciding to move into the foreign market and ship to India, Iran, and South Africa. The company won a tender in 2010 with the Esfahan Steel Company in Iran, which led to Donetskstal announcing plans for a trading company based in the Middle East. However, some of Donetskstal's assets were stopped in 2010, which was compounded a year later by the dispute with Vasyliev, which also affected Donetskstal, as Vasyliev also claimed 50% of Donetskstal. After production resumed, in 2012 Donetskstal took a $500 million loan together with Energo through multiple banks to pay its debts.

=== Involvement with the DPR and breakup ===
As most of Donetskstal's assets were based in the Donbas, the company was heavily affected by the start of the War in the Donbas. In 2015, the Security Service of Ukraine (SBU) said it had seized one of Donetskstal's coke shipments and was opening a case due to the company "financing terrorism" because of its association with work in the pro-Russian, separatist Donetsk People's Republic. The SBU alleged that coke from both Makiivkoks and Yasnuvata was still being shipped from DPR-controlled territory and exported through a firm in Mariupol. It also said that 1 million hryvnias a quarter were deposited into a DPR-based banks and that Donetskstal's assets were among the first to re-register in the DPR and that the company was close to the Head of the DPR, Alexander Zakharchenko. Nusenkis did not comment on the allegations initially, although former President Viktor Yanukovych, who was said to be working with Donetskstal, denied the allegations.

In February 2015, it was announced that Donetskstal would stop production completely for the month. The company also laid off many of its workers, although jobs were kept for people who had allegedly joined the "militia". In April 2015, an official from the DPR said that the restarting of Donetskstal was planned, although by March 2016 it was also alleged that equipment from Yasynuvata's plant was being dismantled and moved to Russia. Makiivkoks was eventually restarted, and it began supplying coke to Russia. A year later, in 2017, Pokrovske was moved out of Donetskstal and transferred to the Industrial Coal Holding (ICH), which in 2018 was sold to a consortium of Metinvest, BVI, and Cyprus-based companies. Cypriot Fintest Trading, was also sold off a few days later to Metinvest, Altana, Misandyco, and Treimur. Metinvest was also reported to have an option on the remaining stakes of Donetskstal after ICU bought up around $280 million of the debt Donetskstal owed to a number of banks.

=== Other activities in Russia ===
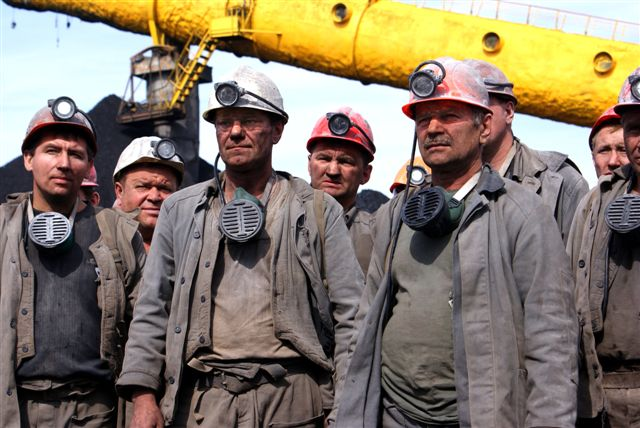
Miners at the Zarechnaya mine in the Kuzbass, Russia. Nusenkis and Energo acquired a partial stake in the mine in 1998.

Nusenkis owns a number of assets in Russia as part of Energo and Donetskstal. The most important asset is the company MPO Kuzbass, which has a subsidiary, Coal Company Zarechnaya. Kuzbass owns the Yurginsky Machine-Building Plant, Mine Zarechnaya, Mine Oktyabrskaya, Mine Aleksiyevskaya, and Mine Karagaylinskoye as of 2011. Oktyabrskaya, in specific, was acquired by Nusenkis in December 2009 after having been part of Kuzbass since 2008. Zarechnaya was acquired in 1998 after negotiations with Leninskugol through Oleksandr Starikov. Aleksiyevskaya was previously part of the Leninskoye mine administration, which he brought in 2007 from Russky Ugol after its owner, Mikhail Gutseriyev, was arrested. In 2012, Nusenkis announced the potential creation of the first machine-building holding for the production of mining equipment in Russia, which would merge four enterprises in Russia and in other countries from MPO Kuzbass. Nusenkis intended to call this company the "Heavy Machinery Corporation", which would consist of Yurginsky, the Czech company, Donetsk Electrotechnical Plant, and the Esser plant in Germany. At the time, news outlets reported that the corporation would be headed by Viktor Mazhukin, the former co-owner of JSC Russian Machines, which is based in Moscow. It was also reported that it was intended to be created in order to compete with larger enterprises, such as Caterpillar and Komatsu Limited.

The following year, in 2013, it was reported that Nusenkis joined the claim of the Zarechnaya Mine in the Arbitration Court of the Kemerovo Region against Salesi Investments and Dutch Indtec Finance during his dispute with Vasyliev over Energo and Donetskstal's ownership. Since the establishment of the DPR, Nusenkis has continued to export raw materials from Russia, including from Karelsky Okatysh mine, which is owned by Alexei Mordashov, although the materials are transported through Kharkiv Oblast and illegally through ports in Mariupol and Berdiansk. Nusenkis also later co-founded the company Interconsulting in Russia, which held most of the shares of LLC UK Zarechnaya since 1999 in Polysayevo, with the rest belonging to JSC Shakhta Zarechnaya. Nusenkis had a personal stake of 4% in Interconsulting, although Nusenkis had denied this; the other shares of Interconsulting are owned by Aleksandr Budnikov, Yegor Kudashov, and Pavel Kosinov. In late 2017, three of his subsidiary enterprises in Russia were declared bankrupt: UK Zarechnaya, Shakhta Zarechnaya, and Shakhta Aleksiyevskaya, while Interconsulting was declared bankrupt itself in 2019, and Investprom, another company that Nusenkis was the sole founder of in Moscow, was too in 2020. Due to this, wages were not paid at the time, which led to strikes, with layoffs beginning in 2020. Zarechnaya was offered for sale in 2020, but had no buyers.

== Personal life ==
In addition to his Ukrainian citizenship, Nusenkis holds Russian citizenship, which he obtained in 1999 while residing in Moscow and heading the Russian market for Energo. As of 2011, he lived in the small village of Pleskovo, which is about 50 km from Moscow, near a boarding school he rebuilt. The boarding school is known as "Pleskovo", after the village, and is an Orthodox school that was the former estate of the Sheremetev family, and where his close relative, also named Viktor Nusenkis, graduated in 2004. He lives with his family there. Mykhailo Volynets said in an interview in 2006 that the reason Nusenkis moved from Ukraine was because of criminal gangs in Donetsk.

=== Wealth and rankings ===
Nusenkis, due to the scale of his holdings and wealth, is often identified as a Ukrainian oligarch and was included as part of the group in an economic study by Demid Chernenko in 2018. In terms of worldwide rankings of the wealthiest people in the world by Forbes, Nusennkis was included twice: in 2012 at #521 in the world and in 2013 at #670 in the world.

In terms of the wealthiest people in Ukraine, he has been included in the list made by Korrespondent during the following years with the estimated wealth of:

- 2006 - $691 million, 14th richest person in Ukraine
- 2007 - $1.1 billion, 13th richest person in Ukraine
- 2008 - $3.3 billion, 7th richest person in Ukraine
- 2009 - $570 million, 11th richest person in Ukraine
- 2010 - $2.3 billion, 6th richest person in Ukraine
- 2011 - $2.9 billion, 6th richest person in Ukraine
- 2012 - $1.7 billion, 7th richest in Ukraine
- 2013 - $2.5 billion, 6th richest person in Ukraine
- 2014 - $3.3 billion, 7th richest person in Ukraine

=== Relations with the UOC-MP and ROC ===
The Epiphany Church in Kozelsk, Russia, under construction in 2010. The church was created at the expense of Nusenkis.

Nusenkis is a heavy supporter and financier of the Russian Orthodox Church (ROC) and previously the Ukrainian Orthodox Church of the Moscow Patriarchate (UOC-MP) until 2011. There are different accounts of when he became heavily religious: some accounts say it began during Energo, while others say it took place during the Soviet era after a fatal accident at Zhdanovska. Regarding the ROC, he first became a sponsor in the late 1990s upon moving to Russia, and supports multiple Orthodox media in Russia and Ukraine, such as "Glas" and "Radost moya". Regarding the UOC-MP, he was the main sponsor of the church during Yanukovych's presidency, giving around 1 million hryvnias a month at the time, and founded 50 Orthodox churches for the Donetsk eparchy. During this time, he supported the idea of a single Orthodox state consisting of Russia, Ukraine, and Belarus, which was aired through his channels Kyivska Rus, Glas, and TON. Every enterprise that Nusenkis owns has a chapel, with workers mandatorily having to attend prayer service at Pokrovske, although this was met with rejection by employees. In 2011, he was also a delegate from the Donetsk eparchy for the election of its patriarch due to his donations. He was also accused of having enough power in the church that he was able to pressure for the dismissal of Archimandrite Kirill Hovorun of the UOC-MP without the Synod's approval, with Hovorun also saying that Nusenkis had pressured his removal to Russia and that he promoted the ideas of the "Russian world" to the UOC-MP.

==== Dispute with UOC-MP in 2011 ====
In 2011, Nusenkis was involved in a highly publicised dispute with the UOC-MP. In July 2011, during a local council that Nusenkis attended as a delegate of the Donetsk eparchy, the council approved a statute that was said to widen the autonomy of the UOC-MP. Nusenkis allegedly rejected this, which Volodymyr Sabodan responded to by saying that the UOC-MP would not get full-on autocephaly, while Metropolitan Sofroniy of Cherkasy said that believers should be able to if they chose. In response, Nusenkis stopped funding parts of the UOC-MP, including Glas, and it was reported by Volodymyr that the money was being redirected to organisations opposed to the autocephaly of the UOC-MP. He also stopped funding a cathedral and stopped the treatment of Volodymyr. He was also accused of stopping funding for the Kyiv branch of UOC-MP and instead choosing to concentrate his funding on the Donbas and pro-Russian parts of the UOC-MP. Bishop Yevstratiy (Zorya), of the then Orthodox Church of Ukraine, said that Nusenkis was trying to pressure and influence the appointment of a new metropolitan of the UOC-MP.

In late 2011, Nusenkis was alleged to have attempted to orchestrate a coup to replace Volodymyr with his favoured candidate, Bishop Hilarion of Donetsk and Mariupol. Sources say that he bribed Bishop Pavlo (Lebid), the then abbot of the Kyiv-Pechersk Lavra, with the post of Metropolitan of Kyiv in exchange for supporting Hilarion's candidacy, although Pavlo rejected this and told Volodymyr. After his attempts failed, Nusenkis pushed in bishops' councils to the statute about autonomy again. After the incident in 2011, Nusenkis withdrew his support for the church and was replaced as chief financier of the UOC-MP by Vadym Novynskyi.

== Sources ==
- Кузин, Сергей (2006). Донецкая мафия. Полиграфкнига.
