= Leonid Baysarov =

Ukrainian politician (born 1947)

- Леонід Байсаров

People's Deputy of Ukraine
- In office 14 May 2002 – 25 May 2006
- In office 12 December 2012 – 27 November 2014

Personal details
- Born: Leonid Vladimirovich Baysarov; 19 June 1947 (age 79) Mykytivka, Ukrainian SSR, Soviet Union (now Ukraine)
- Party: Party of Regions (2002-2014); Non-partisan (2014-2020); Order (2020-?)
- Education: Dnipro Polytechnic; Donetsk National University

Leonid Vladimirovich Baysarov (Ukrainian: Леонід Байсаров; born 16 June 1947) is a Ukrainian politician and businessman who served as a People's Deputy of Ukraine in the Verkhovna Rada during the IV and VII convocations from 2002 to 2006 and from 2012 to 2014, respectively, as a member of the Party of Regions. As a businessman, he was the director of the Pokrovske coal mine for many years and a co-founder of the Energo company.

== Early life ==
Baysarov was born on 16 June 1947 in the small village of Mykytivka, which was then part of the Ukrainian SSR in the Soviet Union. Mykytivka would later be annexed into the city of Horlivka. After graduating from secondary school, Baysarov decided to pursue higher education, graduating in 1972 from Dnipro Polytechnic, specialising as a mining engineer. For three years afterwards, he initially worked at the Shakhtarskanthracite mine in Shakhtarsk, where he rose through the ranks from mining foreman to section chief of the mine's administration No. 39. He eventually left the company in 1975, moving on to work at the Kapitalna coal mine (part of Krasnoarmiyskvugillya) in Dymytrov (now Myrnohrad). During the fifteen years he worked there up until the collapse of the Soviet Union, Baysarov also rose through the ranks from mining foreman to deputy section chief, then section chief, and finally deputy director of the mine.

In 1999, he graduated from Donetsk State University with a degree as a financier. He later also defended his dissertation on the development of technology for combined methods of supporting reused workings to achieve his Candidate of Technical Sciences degree at Dnipro Polytechnic in 2004.

== Business activities ==
In 1990, he was finally promoted to director of the Krasnoarmiysk-Zapadnaya No. 1 mine (now the Pokrovske coal mine) in Pokrovsk. In 1996, when he became mine director and chairman of the board for the mine, the mine's company was privatised and turned into an OJSC. In 2000, the mine issued shares in an agreement with the Ministry of Energy for 115 million hryvnias. The shares were then bought out by Energo (later Donetskstal), which was created in 1992 by oligarchs Viktor Nusenkis and Volodymyr Lohvynenko. However, Baysarov's mine was the only mine out of the Energo group that was supervised directly by him, and not by the company. In 2004, he announced that the mine, which he was still the president of, would invest 200 million hryvnias in the construction of a new complex alongside future plants to build a processing plant and administration complex, which was planned to be finished by Miner's Day in 2006.

After returning to business following his stint in parliament, he returned as general director of the Pokrovske coal mine. During this time, he was recognised as one of the richest men in Ukraine by Focus, being worth $523 million in 2007. Due to this, he was listed as a Ukrainian oligarch, especially in connection with Energo, together with Nusenskis, in an economic study by Demid Chernenko. He retained ownership even after 2014, although in 2019 Energo lost control of the mine and it came under the control of Metinvest, owned by another oligarch Rinat Akhmetov.

== Political career ==
In 2002, Baysarov decided to run in the 2002 Ukrainian parliamentary election during its 4th convocation for the single-mandate constituency No. 49 (Donetsk Oblast). He won with 59.36% of the vote against 13 other opponents, and was initially a member of the For United Ukraine! electoral bloc upon entering the Verkhovna Rada until June of 2002. He became a member of the Party of Regions faction that month. During his time in the 4th convocation, he was Chair of the Subcommittee on Industry Development Strategy, Investments, and Privatisation. During his initial term in the Rada, he was a strong proponent of privatisation when he headed the subcommittee. He was also one of the leaders of two enterprises that staged a protest "factory whistle" in solidarity with Viktor Yanukovych during the Orange Revolution and against the policies of Viktor Yushchenko, alongside Azovstal Iron and Steel Works. Baysarov was also an authorised representative of Yanukovych in electoral district no. 49 from 2004 to 2005. In general, though, Baysarov did not submit a single request or law to the Verkhovna Rada alongside multiple other deputies in Donetsk Oblast from the period of 2002 to 2005.

During the subsequent 2006 Ukrainian parliamentary elections, Baysarov did not run for reelection and instead returned to his business activities. In 2010, he ran as a candidate for the Donetsk Oblast Council from the Party of Regions as candidate no. 7 on the party's electoral list. He decided to run to be in the Verkhovna Rada again during the 2012 Ukrainian parliamentary elections, this time for the single-mandate constituency No. 50 (Donetsk Oblast, which includes the cities of Pokrovsk and Dobropillia), representing the Party of Regions. He easily won the election with 72.71% of the vote against three other opponents, and thus also gave up his seat on the Donetsk Oblast Council due to dual mandates being prohibited. During his term, in response to Euromaidan, he voted for the so-called "laws on dictatorship" and voted absent on Resolution No. 4158, which condemned the use of violence against civilians during the protests.

Despite the War in the Donbas, Baysarov attempted to run again during the early 2014 Ukrainian parliamentary election for No. 50, but this time he was not affiliated with a party. This time, the district was heavily contested, with fellow former Party of Regions member and president of FC Zorya Luhansk, Yevhen Heller, running in the same district. It was reported that even before the elections, then Deputy Governor of Dnipropetrovsk Oblast, Hennadii Korban, invited Baysarov out and asked him to withdraw in favour of Heller, who was considered close to Ihor Kolomoisky. On 16 October, men in black surrounded the offices of the Krasnoarmiysk-Zapadnaya No. 1 mine and wrecked his office, which led the Party of Regions to propose expelling Heller from the faction. During the actual elections, the CEC showed that the voting was heavily irregular, with the Opposition Bloc accusing the voting of being falsified in favour of Heller. On 1 November, the CEC ordered a recount of precincts within the constituency, while Heller filed with the Kyiv Appellate Administrative Court to ban the recount. In the end, regardless of the controversy, Heller ended up winning the district with 39.54% of the vote. After this, Baysarov would mostly retire from politics, although he joined the regionalist party "Order", of which he became the head of the regional organisation. In this capacity, he supported the nomination of Andriy Aksyonov to the Verkhovna Rada during the by-elections in 2021, who was a fellow "Order" party member who ran in his former district of No. 50. Baysarov himself also attempted to run in the Pokrovsk City Council for "Order", but was not selected.

== Personal life ==
He is married and has two sons.

As early as October 2014, Baysarov was accused of voting in the 2014 Donbas status referendums that attempted to legitimise the pro-Russian, separatist Donetsk People's Republic. In 2025, he was put under sanctions by the National Security and Defense Council of Ukraine on accusations that he worked with Russia.

== Honours and awards ==
Baysarov was awarded the following awards. However, on 19 January 2025, in accordance with Presidential Decree No. 38, all of his awards were revoked by President Volodymyr Zelenskyy as a person under sanctions by Ukraine.

- Medal "For Distinguished Service" (1996)
- Honored Miner of the Ukrainian SSR (1987)
- Distinguished Miner of Ukraine (1995)
- Order of Merit, III degree (1997)
- Order of Merit, II degree (2000)
- Order of Merit, I degree (2003)
- State Prize of Ukraine in Science and Technology (2003)
- Hero of Ukraine (Order of the State class as a civilian, 2004)
- Order of Prince Yaroslav the Wise, V/5th class (2012)
