= Coal Company Zarechnaya =

Russian coal company

Zarechnaya
- Industry: Coal mining
- Founded: 2008
- Headquarters: Moscow, Russia
- Key people: Alexander Starikov, Victor Shevtsov, Vitaly Kharitonov
- Products: Coal
- Owner: Victor Nusenkis
- Website: www.ukzarechnaya.ru

Zarechnaya (Russian: Заречная) is a Russian coal company. It is a subsidiary of MPO Kuzbass, owned by Viktor Nusenkis. The company is headquartered in Polysaevo, Kemerovo region. Managing director of the company is Vitaly Kharitonov.

== History ==
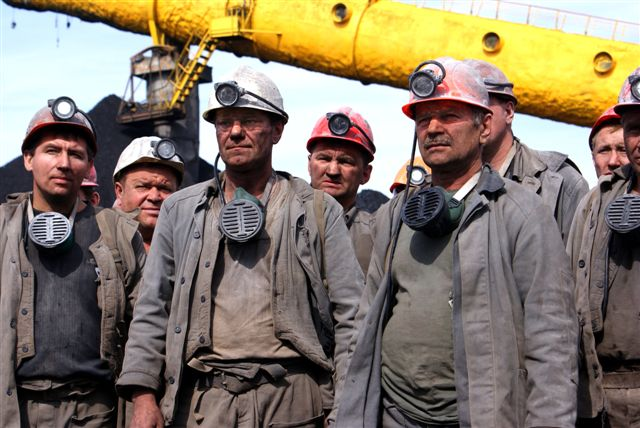
The miners of LLC Mine Zarechnaya

Zarechnaya was restructured into a holding in 2008. It includes 6 coal mines (3 operating mines and 3 under construction), a washing plant and a number of supporting enterprises.

== Subsidiaries ==
=== Mine Zarechnaya ===
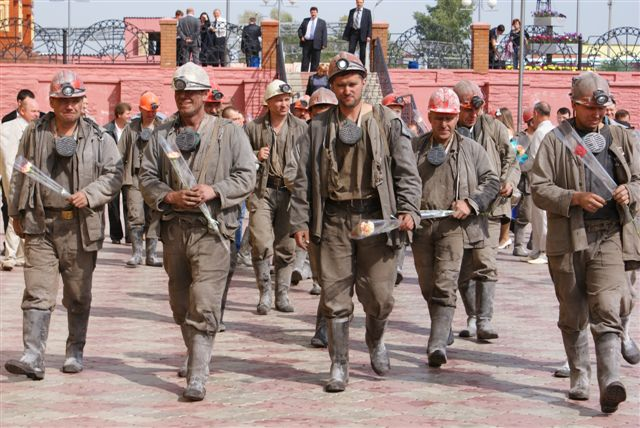
The record of August 2009

Mine Zarechnaya (ex- North-Polysaevskaya) is the largest enterprise of the group. It was the first hydraulic mine in the USSR.

=== Coal washing plant Sputnik ===
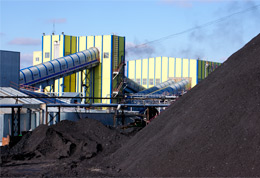
Coal washing plant Sputnik

Coal washing plant Sputnik was built and put into operation in 2003 with the full cycle of enrichment and a closed water supply.

=== Mine Oktyabrskaya ===
Mine Oktyabrskaya (ex-Polysaevskaya-2) was put into operation in 1956 with estimated capacity of 1.2 million tons per year. In 2010 Oktyabrskaya was purchased by Coal Company Zarechnaya.

=== Mine Aleksiyevskaya ===
Mine Aleksievskaya (ex-Leninskoye mine), put into operation in 1964, was purchased by Zarechnayain 2007. Mine reconstruction allowed it to avoid being shut down and became the reason for coal production increase.

=== Mine Karagaylinskoye ===
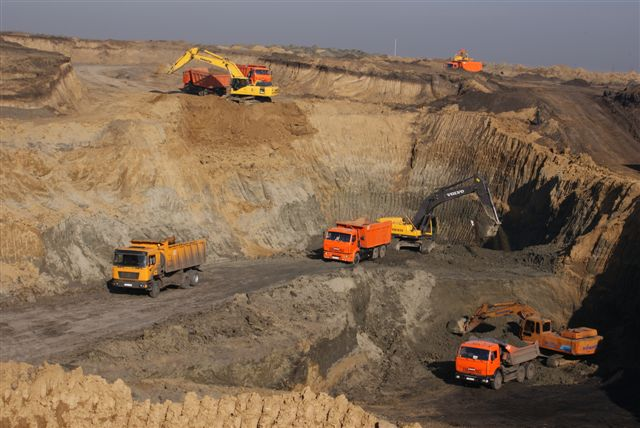
Mine Karagaylinskoye

The mine was purchased in 2006 and now is under construction, that takes place on subsoil area, once belonged to company Mine Karagaylinskaya, closed as a result of total coal industry restructuring in 1990s.

=== Mine Sibirskaya ===
Mine Sibirskaya was purchased in 2010. It is situated on the coal deposit of the ex-mine Kuznetskaya.

=== Mine Seraphimovskaya ===
The license for prospection and mining on the mine site Seraphimovsky, Ushakovsky deposit, was purchased in 2009.

=== Gramoteino Central Electrical Shops ===
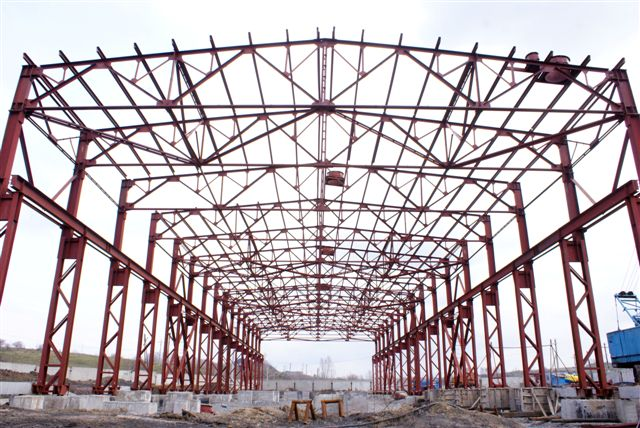
Gramoteinslie central electromechanical works

Gramoteino Central Electrical Shops were established in 1976. In 2004 they were purchased by Mine Zarechnaya. Gramoteino Central Electrical Shops produce hardware, arched steel timbers, monorail and switch elements, provide complete overhaul of electric motors.

=== Georesurs Research Institute ===
Georesurs was purchased in 2007. The enterprise provides a complex of geological survey and mining operations, efficient solving of subsoil research issues and coal banks degassing.

=== Technoparkinvest-Kuzbass ===
Technoparkinvest-Kuzbass was established in 2008 for participation in forming new hi-tech production in partnership with Techno park of Kuzbass. The main fields of innovation activity are:

- deep coal processing – for production of high marketable coal output on the site of mining;
- methane extraction from coal layers for increasing security of purifying and mining processes;
- development of mining machine production;
- dealing with ecological issues.

=== Baltic Coal Terminal ===
Baltic Coal Terminal is a coal terminal in Ventspils, Latvia. In 2009 a start-up facility was set in operation with the capacity of 6 million tons a year. It’s equipped with up-to-date machinery, meeting all requirements of ecological security. That allows to load ships with the full load weight up to 150,000 tons and provides a complex of services that improve the quality of the coal such as displacement, refinement and magnetic separation.
