= Baltic Coal Terminal =

Company based in Latvia

The Baltic Coal Terminal is a special purpose company operating a specialized coal terminal in the Free port of Ventspils, Latvia.

== Terminal ==
The terminal project started in 2005. The construction permit was issued by the Ventspils City Council in July 2005. The coal terminal was officially opened on 24 November 2008. The main purpose of the terminal is to store and ship Russian coal to Western Europe and the USA.

The Baltic Coal Terminal is the first closed-end coal terminal in the Baltic region. The terminal was designed by the Latvian company Ierosme, and the construction was carried out by Ventspils Tirdzniecības Osta-G. A new pier with two quays for coal handling was designed by the architect offices Veralux Ehitus, and it was constructed by Latvijas Tilti. The terminal equipment was provided by Fam Мagdeburger Förderanlagen und Baumaschinen. The total amount of the investments made reaches €75 millions which includes bank financing as well as shareholders' investments. The bank syndicate included DnB NORD, Nordea, and UniCredit.

The annual capacity of the terminal is five million tons of coal. After the second building phase finished the terminal will be capable of letting through up to ten million tons of coal per year.

== Company ==
JSC Baltic Coal Terminal was incorporated in January 2005. The shareholders of JSC Baltic Coal Terminal are Latvian stevedore company Ventspils Tirdzniecības Osta (Ventspils Commercial Port) and the LLC Indteс Baltic Coal, a subsidiary of Indtec Finanse B.V. of Coal Company Zarechnaya, which owns Russian coal mine Zarechnaya of Kuznetsk Basin. The Chairman of the Board is Alexander Starikov and the Vice-Chairman of the Board is Valery Pashuta.
