= Mykola Surgai =

Soviet-Ukrainian politician and businessman (1933-2009)

- Микола Сургай
- An official portrait of him from 1994.

Minister of the Coal Industry of the Ukrainian SSR
- Premier: Nikolai Ryzhkov
- In office 22 October 1985 – 9 September 1987
- Preceded by: Mykola Hrynko
- Succeeded by: Office abolished

People's Deputy of Ukraine
- In office 11 May 1994 – 12 May 1998

Deputy of the Supreme Soviet of the Ukrainian Soviet Socialist Republic
- In office 1980–1990

Personal details
- Born: Mykola Safonovych Surgai; 20 November 1933 Lyubivka (Krasnokutsk Raion), Ukrainian SSR, Soviet Union (now Ukraine)
- Died: 26 December 2009 (aged 76) Donetsk, Ukraine
- Party: Communist Party of the Soviet Union; Independent
- Education: Donetsk National Technical University

Mykola Safonovych Surgai (Ukrainian: Микола Сафонович Сургай; 20 November 1933-26 December 2009) was a Soviet and later Ukrainian politician and businessman who served as the Minister of the Coal Industry of the Ukrainian SSR from 1985 to 1987. After the Soviet era, he also served as a People's Deputy of Ukraine in the Verkhovna Rada during its second convocation from 1994 to 1998. Surgai was also active in the coal industry of the Ukrainian SSR for decades, being appointed director of multiple mines and trusts within Donetsk Oblast from 1963 to 1990.

== Early life ==
Surgai was born on 20 November 1933 in the small village of Lyubivka, which was then part of the Ukrainian SSR in the Soviet Union. He is ethnically Ukrainian and was born into a family of collective farmers. His father was a blacksmith for the village and not from Donetsk Oblast. After graduating from secondary school, he became a student at the Kharkiv Mining Technical School, which he left in 1953 to become a mining foreman at the "Pravda" mine of Donetskugol. He gradually worked his way up at Pravda, becoming deputy chief and section chief, while also attending the Donetsk Polytechnic Institute (now the Donetsk National Technical University). He graduated from the school in 1959 with a specialty as a mining engineer, and thereafter moved to the "Vostochnaya" Mine in Donetsk as a section chief. He was eventually promoted to director of the mine by the time he left.

Decades later, in 1993, he completed his candidate dissertation on the development of the coal industry in Ukraine. In 2002, he completed his doctoral dissertation at the Institute of Geotechnical Mechanics of the National Academy of Sciences of Ukraine.

== Business career ==
In December 1963, he was appointed director of the Zaperevalna mine, which was also in Donetsk, and was in poor condition when he was initially appointed director. After six years, he managed to turn the condition around, although the mine would later be closed during restructuring. Three years later, in 1966, he was appointed head of the Proletarskugol trust and was also later appointed deputy head of the Donetskugillya combine during this time. Surgai left the enterprise in 1978 to become General Director of Donetskugol, which he did until 1982. After leaving the post for politics, he returned to directing in 1987, when he was appointed as General Director of Donetskgosugleprom while also being the head of the territorial administration for the coal industry. Around this time, he was credited with initiating housing construction for miners, including the microdistrict Kuibyshevka in Donetsk.

== Political career ==
=== In the Soviet era ===
In 1980, during its 10th convocation, he joined the Supreme Soviet of the Ukrainian Soviet Socialist Republic as a deputy, thus starting his political career. He remained in the 11th convocation, which ended in 1990. Simultaneously, in 1982, he was appointed 1st Deputy Minister of the Coal Industry of the Ukrainian SSR, a post he held until October 1985, when he was promoted to the post of minister until 1987, when the ministry was abolished. As minister, he was mostly known for his response to the Chornobyl disaster in 1986, where he was a participant in the liquidation and commander of a miners' detachment sent from the Donbas. Shortly before the collapse of the Soviet Union and after the end of his tenure in the 11th convocation, he was appointed 1st Deputy Chairman of the State Committee for Safe Working Practices of the Ukrainian SSR.

=== In an independent Ukraine ===
Surgai also began chairing the State Committee for the Coal Industry in 1990, which he did until November 1994. In the latter post, he helped create the Energo concern in 1992, which was led by Viktor Nusenkis. He also backed the design of a new coal-cutting machine by the Donetsk National Technical University that same year. During the 1994 Ukrainian parliamentary elections, he ran to be a People's Deputy of Ukraine for constituency No. 142 (Torez, Donetsk Oblast). He was nominated by a labour collective and ultimately won the seat. In the Rada, he sat on the Committee for Fuel and Energy, and was part of both the "Constitutional Centre" and "MDH" groups, while retaining his status as an independent politician.

After he chose not to re-run in the 1998 elections, he was appointed to an advisory group of the reformed Ministry of Coal Industry of Ukraine. In interviews during this time, he advocated for Ukraine being energy independent via the coal it mined, while also criticising that there were allegedly almost no miners in politics and said coal unions were being used as a bargaining chip in politics. On 28 November 2006, he was then appointed Chairman of the Public Council of the Ministry of Coal Industry, with Stanislav Yanko as his deputy. The council was created two years earlier in 2006, and was supposed to include scientists, politicians, and trade unions. In 2008, while still in the post, he spoke to the media and blamed "anti-state policy" for the coal problems that Ukraine had been recently experiencing, and that not a single mine had been completed since Ukrainian independence.

== Death ==
Surgai died on 26 December 2009. A farewell ceremony was held at the Expodonbass Exhibition and Entertainment Centre, and he was buried on 29 December, which was planned to be attended by Viktor Yanukovych. He was ultimately buried at Novoignatyevsky Cemetery in Donetsk.

== Honours and awards ==
Surgai was awarded the following honours. The Yuzhnodonbasskaya No. 3 Mine was also named after him:

- Red Banner of Labour (1966)
- Red Banner of Labour, 2nd award (1971)
- Order of the Badge of Honour (1976)
- Honoured Miner of the Ukrainian SSR (1979)
- Order of Lenin (1981)
- Certificate of Honour from the Presidium of the Supreme Soviet of the Ukrainian SSR (1983)
- Order of the October Revolution (1986)
- Certificate of Honour from the Cabinet of Ministers of Ukraine (1998)
- Order of Merit, III degree (2001)
- Hero of Ukraine (Order of State as a civilian, 2003)
- Certificate of Honour from the Cabinet of Ministers of Ukraine, second award (2004)
- Order of Merit, II degree (2008)
- Full Chevalier of Miner's Glory Medal and Miner's Valour Medal
