= Ruslan Trebushkin =

Ukrainian politician (born 1975)

- Руслан Требушкін
- An official photo of him from 2019.

People's Deputy of Ukraine
- In office 29 August 2019 – 16 December 2020
- Preceded by: Yevhen Heller
- Succeeded by: Andriy Aksyonov (by-election)
- Constituency: Donetsk Oblast, No. 50

Mayor of Myrnohrad
- In office October 2010 – 2015

Mayor of Pokrovsk
- In office 2020–2022
- Succeeded by: Serhiy Dobryak (as head of the city military administration)
- In office 2015–2019

Personal details
- Born: Ruslan Valeriiovych Trebushkin; 27 November 1975 (age 50) Donetsk, Ukrainian SSR, Soviet Union
- Party: Party of Regions (2008-2014); Independent (2015-2019); Opposition Bloc (2019-2020) "For the Future" (2020)
- Education: Donetsk Academy of Management and Public Administration (2006)

Ruslan Valeriiovych Trebushkin (Ukrainian: Руслан Валерійович Требушкін; born 27 November 1975) is a Ukrainian politician who served as a People's Deputy of Ukraine in the Verkhovna Rada representing the 9th convocation from 2019 to 2020, when he resigned early to take on the post of Mayor of Pokrovsk with the Opposition Bloc. A long-time figure in politics in Donetsk Oblast, he was also previously the Mayor of Myrnohrad (then known as Dimitrov) from 2010 to 2015, and then Mayor of nearby Pokrovsk from 2015 to 2019. After his resignation from parliament, he again served as Mayor of Pokrovsk from 2020 until 2022, when the Russian invasion of Ukraine started and he was replaced by the Head of the Military Administration of Pokrovsk, Serhiy Dobryak, due to Pokrovsk becoming a frontline city.

== Early life ==
Trebushkin was born on 27 November 1975 in the city of Donetsk, which was then part of the Ukrainian SSR of the Soviet Union. After graduating from secondary school, he immediately started working, becoming the director of the enterprise "Ruslan" in 1994. He led "Ruslan" until 2001, when he was appointed director of Donmet LLC. After briefly leaving the business sector, he returned to serve as CEO of Donmet from 2005 to 2009. During this time, he graduated from the Donetsk Academy of Management and Public Administration in 2006 with a master's degree in finance. For one year, from 2009 to 2010, he also served as director of the Dimitrov (now Myrnohrad) Multisectoral Association of Communal Enterprises.

== Political career ==
=== 2001-2010: Early career ===
In 2001, Trebushkin first entered politics when he was appointed chairman of the prototype Dimitrov youth organisation of the Party of Regions. The youth wing organisation was not officially registered until 2002. After the 2002 Ukrainian local elections, in which Vitali Klyuchko became Mayor of Dimitrov, Trebushkin was appointed as his adviser. He officially left the position in 2005. He returned to politics only in 2008 when he joined the Party of Regions, and was afterwards elected a deputy to the Donetsk Oblast Council of the 5th convocation.

=== 2010-2015: Mayor of Dimitrov/Myrnohrad ===
During his term as mayor, Trebushkin tried to heavily promote Dimitrov as a city to host motocross events (depicted here), and a new track was built within the city for it.

The Church of St. Viktor that was opened during his term in October 2012.

In October 2010, Trebushkin ran for the post of Mayor of Dimitrov (now Myrnohrad) with the Party of Regions. He ran against four other candidates: Oleksandr Abramov (Batkivshchyna), Vyacheslav Syrota (Union of Left Forces, Larsya Revva (Front for Change), and Volodymyr Lysychenko (Strong Ukraine). In the end, he ended up winning the election on 5 November 2010, with the Party of Regions sweeping the city council also, with only the Front for Change taking any other council seats. After becoming mayor, Trebushkin heavily campaigned for motorsport events to be held in the city. In May 2011, he confirmed that the city would build a motocross track with international standards about three kilometres from Dimitrov. Trebushkin received support in the project from his long-time associate, Viktor Yanukovych. Afterwards, he successfully managed to campaign for the European Motocross Championships to be held in the city, with Trebushkin chairing the organising committee for it. The event took place in June 2012. After the motocross events, he helped consecrate the new St. Viktor Church near Dimitrovpohruztrans in October 2012.

During the following year in office, Trebushkin said that the city budget did not have enough to fund the city's central city hospital, and departments would need to be compressed so that parts of the hospital could be leased or privatised. He returned to trying to get Dimitrov to be a leading city in motocross in December 2013, signing a long-term contract in Teutschenthal with Youthstream, the then promoter of the motocross world championships. This contract confirmed Dimitrov would at least host a championship stage in 2014, with an expected output of 60,000 visitors. However, things did not turn out this way, as in February 2014 during Euromaidan protests, residents of Dimitrov under Trebushkin delivered food and socks to the Berkut police, who were heavily controversial in their handling of protests. The newspaper Novosti Donbas opined that at first Trebushkin evidently supported the Anti-Maidan protests, as he confirmed that self-defence detachments would be formed with the police and veterans. During the height of the protests, some people later claimed that Trebushkin publicly thanked Russian president Vladimir Putin for the 2014 Russian annexation of Crimea, and that he purposely cancelled planned pro-Ukrainian marches in the city as "unsafe". Novosti Donbas later said that he changed his position when it became clear that the Euromaidan protests would succeed.

After these events, Trebushkin initially attempted to leave the post of mayor and ran as a self-nominated candidate for the snap 2014 Ukrainian parliamentary elections within constituency No. 50. He later withdrew shortly before the vote. A few months later, in July 2015, he said "provocations" were being prepared against him, such as bribes. Due to Dimitrov being within the Anti-Terrorist Operation Zone (ATO) during the War in the Donbas and near the frontlines, it was heavily theorised that a few months later a military-civil administration would likely be created to take over the post of mayor in the city. Trebushkin argued heavily against this, and said that unarmed security services were intimidating people purposely. During this same session, another activist claimed that Trebushkin had raised the Donetsk People's Republic (DPR)'s flagpole in the city, but Trebushkin denied this and said that he was proud of the Ukrainian flag.

=== 2015-2019: Mayor of Pokrovsk ===
The stele of Krasnoarmeysk, before it was renamed to Pokrovsk in 2016.

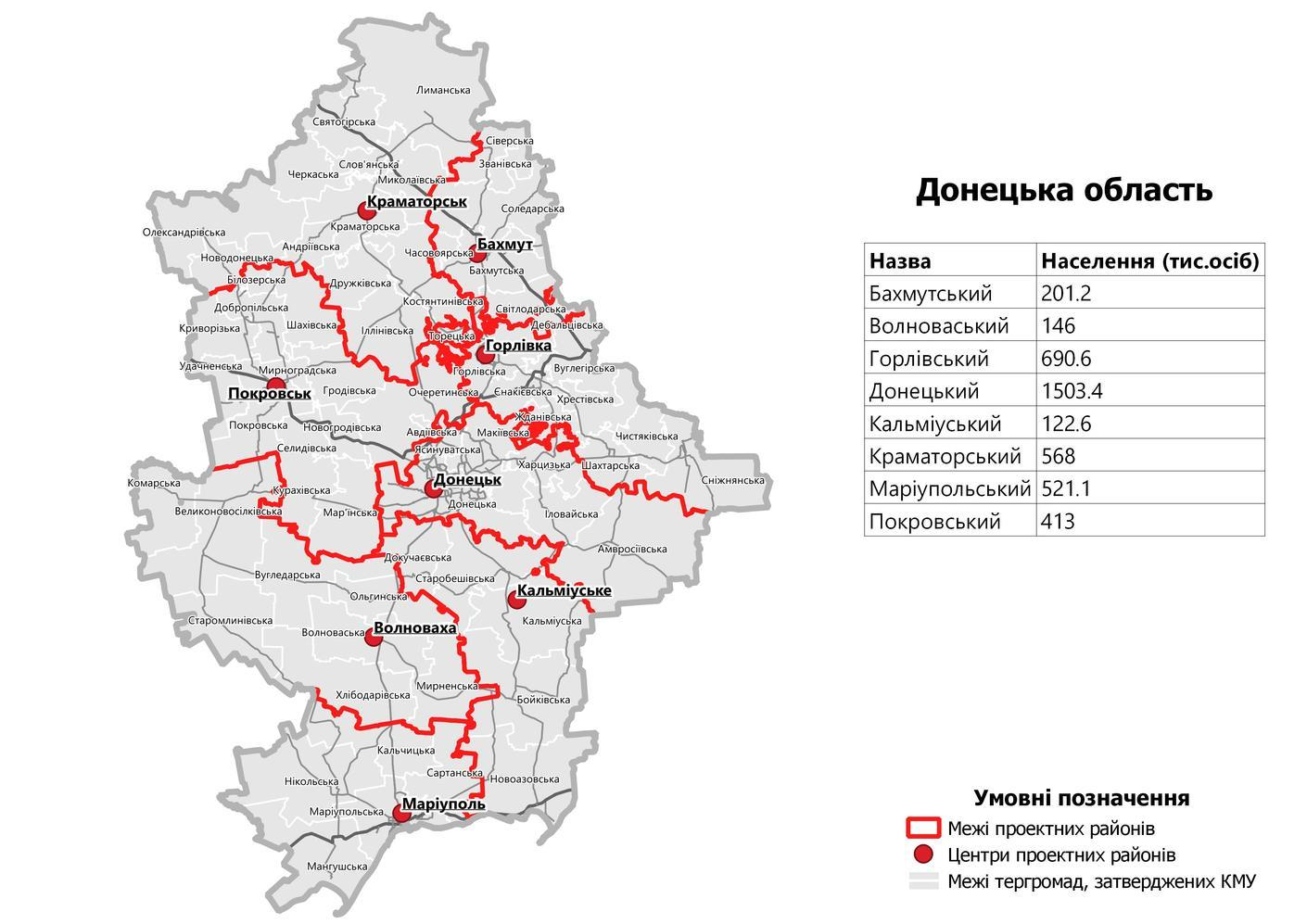
During his initial term, Trebushkin pushed for the uniting of Pokrovsk ("Покровськ", bolded on the map) and Myrnohrad ("Мирноградська" on the map). Both are nearby and are on the western side of Donetsk Oblast.

Shortly after leaving the post of Mayor of Dimitrov, Trebushkin decided to register as a self-nominated candidate to be Mayor of nearby Krasnoarmeysk. Despite being self-nominated, he initially received heavy support from the regional organisation of the Opposition Bloc, although he came into conflict with it when he started replacing Opposition Bloc seats upon becoming mayor, with the local chair, Tetiana Bulhakova, saying he replaced them with "Trebushkin's people". It was already projected by OPORA in November 2015 that he would win in a landslide, which did in fact happen as he won with 17,441 votes compared to 1,582 for Serhii Andriichenko of the Youth Party and 533 for Serhii Dorosh of the Petro Poroshenko Bloc. After his election in November, Pavlo Zhebrivskyi, the then head of the Military-Civilian Administration of Donetsk Oblast, said that the votes would be "felt for a long time", accusing Trebushkin of coercion through enterprises and of earlier claims of separatism, alongside the vote in Mayor of Mariupol. After Trebushkin was elected, a hot point became renaming the city after decommunisation from Krasnoarmeysk. In January 2016, a working group put forward renaming the city in a public survey, although Trebushkin voiced his opposition to the renaming because he said the vast majority of residents did not wish for this to happen. By March, the then deputy mayor, Yurii Tretiak, said that he, the Verkhovna Rada, and the Institute of National Memory had proposed the name Hryshyne over Pokrovsk, although Tretiak acknowledged that Pokrovsk would likely be the favoured name citywide. The council then said they preferred the name Pokrovsk, although Trebushkin continued on with saying he opposed the renaming. By May 2016, the city's name was chosen as Pokrovsk, which was celebrated with new stamps and seals.

After being newly minted as Pokrovsk, Trebushkin said that he would lead reconstruction designs for the Yubileinysi Park while the Mir Cinema would be redesigned by investors, while also confirming that earlier plans at Gorky Park had been delayed. In late July, he also proposed to unite the cities of Pokrovsk, Myrnohrad (which had also been recently renamed from Dimitrov), and the small Rivne village together (Trebushkin had long advocated for this even as Mayor of Dimitrov). He favoured the nearby village of Rodynske, which was going through a political crisis at the time, not to be united with the others and instead go to Novoekonomichne. Nothing ever came of this, though.

==== 2016-2018: Embezzlement case ====
By the end of the year, in December, the Security Service of Ukraine (SBU) confirmed they had searched offices in Pokrovsk, including those of Trebushkin, which was reported to be due to embezzlement at the time. After multiple months of radio silence, in April 2017 the Prosecutor's Office of Donetsk Oblast confirmed that they had suspicions against Trebushkin for false information in his declarations, while Trebushkin rebuked the prosecutor and said it was due to "political order". The prosecutor then tried to get Trebushkin under house arrest, but the Court of Kramatorsk rejected the request, instead just lowering it to barring Trebushkin from leaving Pokrovsk for sixty days without permission. In early February 2018, after the barring had eventually passed, Trebushkin withdrew entirely from public view. By April 2018, Trebushkin claimed many things: he was sick or that he was on a business trip, but his posts on social media contradicted this. Zhebrivskyi eventually confirmed in May the rumours that the earlier prosecution was keeping him away, and that Trebushkin was deliberately waiting for the end of limitations on the case to return. Later that month, Trebushkin publicly said that he had been offered to resign as mayor in exchange for the embezzlement cases being dropped, but that he had refused, although another councillor, Serhii Andriichenko, said that Trebushkin had fled altogether. He reappeared once in August, but finally in September 2018 the Prosecutor's Office of Dnipropetrovsk Oblast confirmed that proceedings had been closed due to a lack of crime, despite the earlier findings of NAZK. He finally returned on 17 September, after having left the city for around seven months, although Trebushkin said he had never stopped working for Pokrovsk.

=== 2019-2020: Verkhovna Rada ===
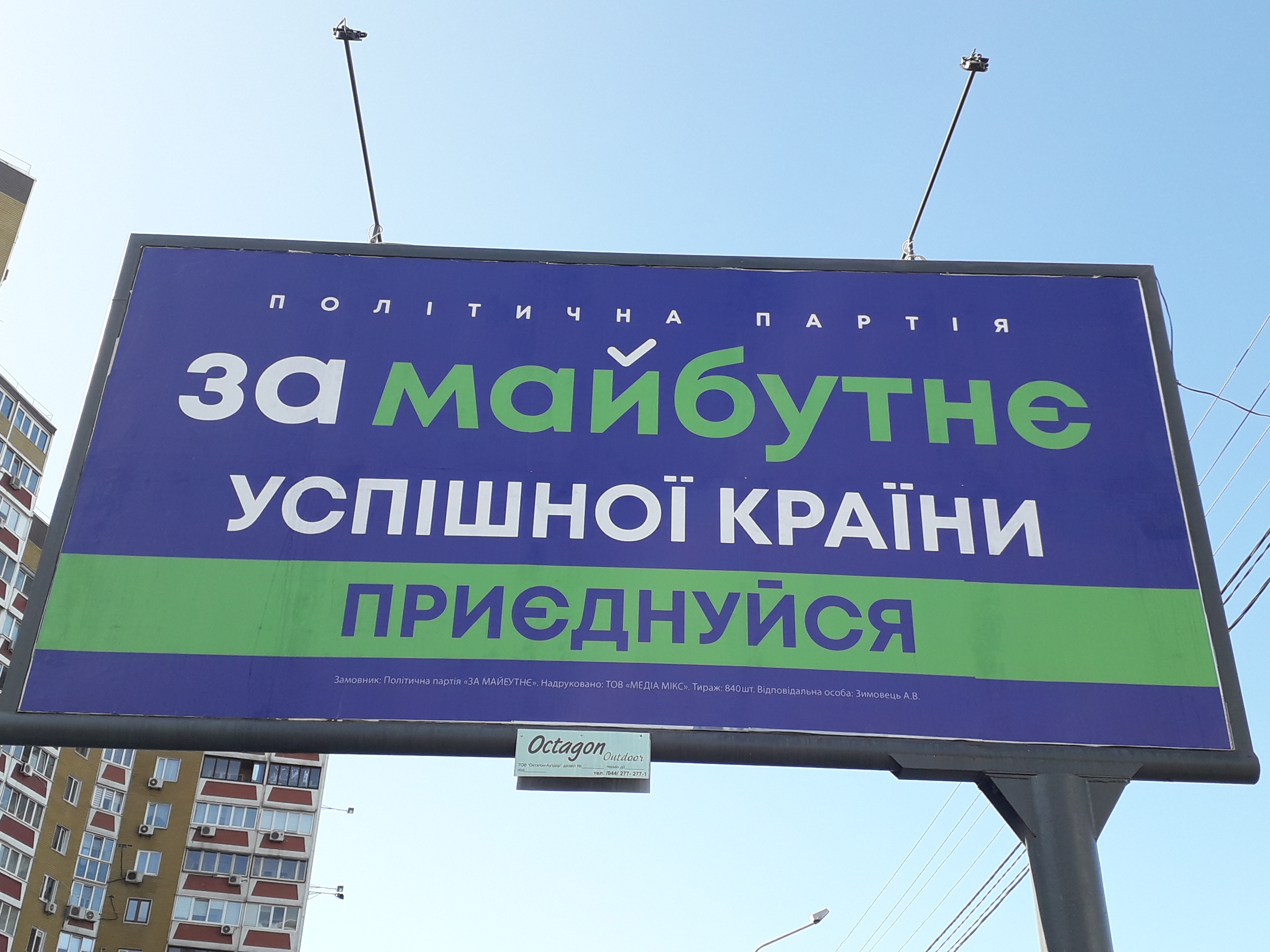
Election sign for the party "For the Future", which he joined in 2020 and was elected to a third term as Mayor of Pokrovsk for.

In 2019, Trebushkin confirmed that he would be running in the upcoming 2019 Ukrainian parliamentary elections. In June, he also further confirmed that he would be running in the single-mandate constituency (No. 50) with the Opposition Platform - For Life. No. 50 consists of the cities of Pokrovsk, Myrnohrad, and Dobropillia, along with parts of Dobropillia Raion. Soon after, the then Mayor of Dobropillia, Andriy Aksyonov, also confirmed he would be running within the district, but as a self-nominated candidate. However, the race soon became highly controversial, with frequent clashes afterwards that led to more police being stationed at No. 50. Activists set up tents calling for fair elections and the prevention of fraud, claiming that work was being sabotaged. The day after the protests, with Trebushkin leading in the votes, the police opened criminal proceedings about violations in the district. The National Police of Ukraine were then called, and they brought in their reserve special forces to provide and stabilise the situation until the Central Election Commission of Ukraine (CEC) could continue going through the votes. The CEC confirmed in early August 2019 that the constituency was going beyond the legal field. After a failed recount, Trebushkin was confirmed as the winner in the 50th on 6 August 2019.

After Trebushkin was elected to the 9th Rada, he was initially an independent and was set to become a member of the Committee of the Budget. He also submitted one draft law, No. 2725, which proposed allocating more than a billion hryvnias to the coal industry to pay off wage arrears. However, he unexpectedly resigned from the parliament on 16 December 2020. This was after he ran and was elected Mayor of Pokrovsk in early November 2020 as a member of the "For the Future" party.

=== 2020-2022: Return as mayor ===
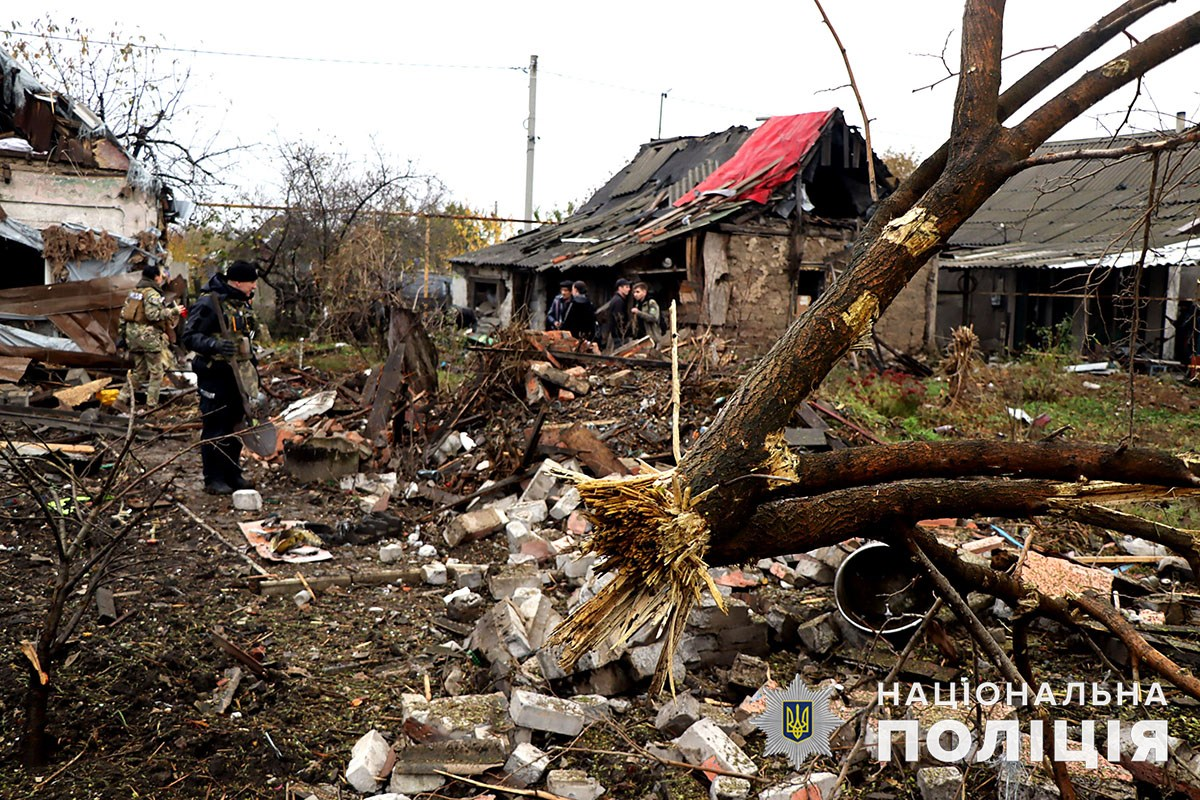
Pokrovsk after shelling by Russian forces in 2022.

After being re-elected, Trebushkin said that Pokrovsk, with the support of USAID, would create a multifunctional centre for administrative services in January 2021. However, his main problem would soon be the water supply to the city due to previous debts to the Water of Donbas company. Multiple districts of Pokrovsk were left without water due to the debts, which led Trebushkin to say the cost of water would be raised by a third with the support of an installment plan from the city budget. An Epicentr K market was confirmed to be planned in September 2021 after the land was given for nearly 3 million hryvnias.

==== Russian invasion of Ukraine ====
Shortly after the 2022 Russian invasion of Ukraine, Russian forces began to continuously shell Pokrovsk with cluster munitions, burning down apartments and houses and killing and maiming people. The evacuation of the city immediately began, with a special evacuation train coming from Lviv in May as the gas supply ended due to the close proximity of the frontline. However, he confirmed there would be no deadline for evacuating from Donetsk Oblast. He once again called for evacuation in June 2022 as the situation worsened, saying that people should go by train to Lviv from the Pokrovsk railway station, which could be done for free. As the situation continued to worsen, he was dismissed as mayor, with Serhiy Dobryak becoming the Head of the Military Administration of Pokrovsk during martial law.

=== Subsequent activities ===
After being dismissed, Trebushkin disappeared, but continued to receive his salary as Mayor of Pokrovsk. He would only come to light again in a highly controversial video in February 2025, when he appealed to Ukrainian President Volodymyr Zelenskyy in Russian for a peace agreement. He accused Zelenskyy of ignoring the fact that the majority of Ukrainians did not want to continue the war, and that the people who still remained in Pokrovsk were calling for peace. In the comments of the video published, many people questioned why he continued to speak in Russian, with residents still in Pokrovsk mocking him for having left a long time ago and not spoken up about the situation. The military administration of Pokrovsk said that Trebushkin no longer exercised power, and said that Zelenskyy was trying to strive for peace, but said that Ukraine could not make concessions. Vadym Filashkin, the Governor of Donetsk Oblast, also confirmed that Trebushkin had not been in Donetsk Oblast to have seen the situation since he was dismissed as mayor. In March, he later appeared in Brussels, Belgium, where he said that Ukrainians could receive temporary protection and benefits through a service centre in Brussels and get paperwork through UkrVoice. After another year, he reappeared on social media, and confirmed that he now resides in Nice, France.

== Personal life ==
He is married to Viktoriia Trebushkina. He has children. In his declarations for 2018, he confirmed that he has an apartment in Pokrovsk and a residential space in Myrnohrad for temporary stay, while his wife owns land Lysivka (near Pokrovsk) and an apartment in Kyiv. They have children.
