= Andriy Aksyonov =

Ukrainian politician

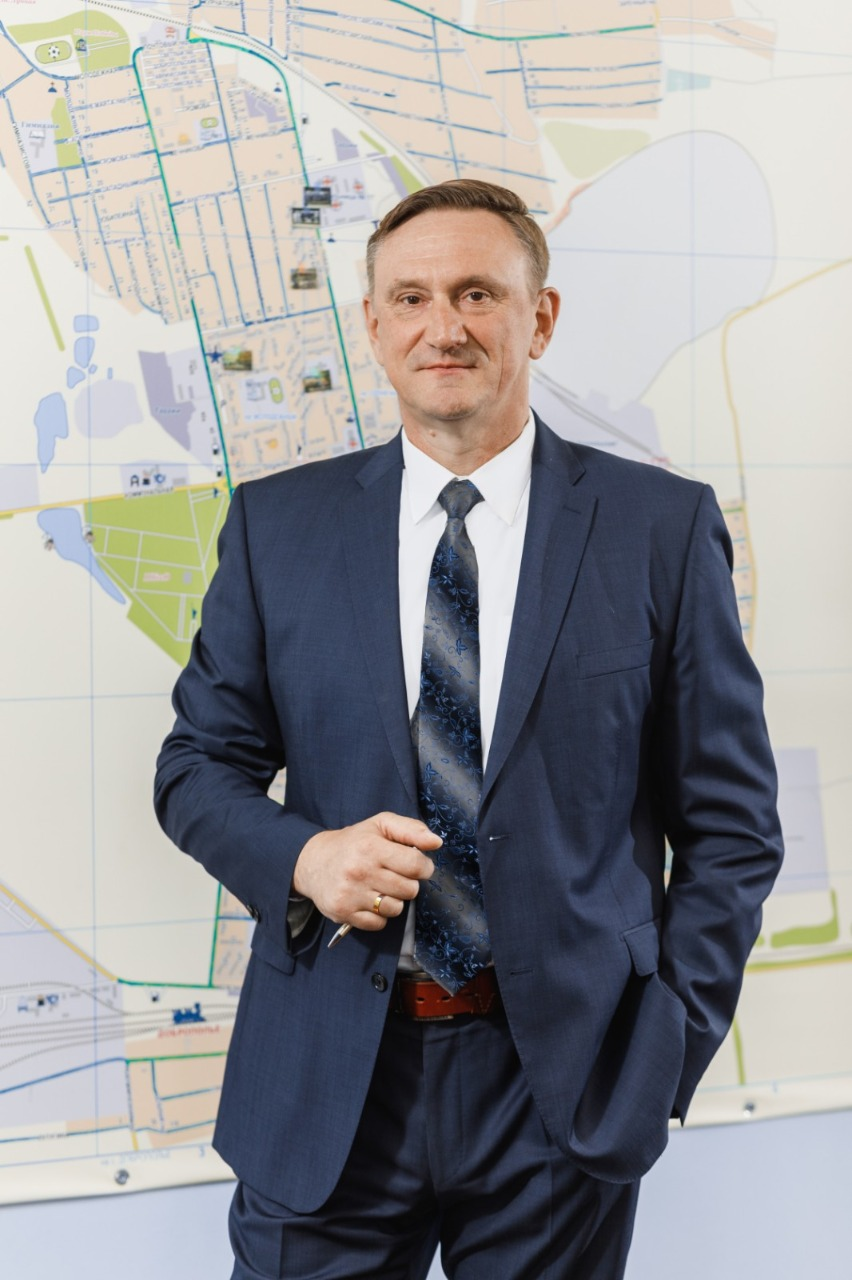

Deputy of the Verkhovna Rada
- In office 19 May 2021 – 13 January 2023

Personal details
- Party: non-partisan

Andriy Anatoliyovych Aksyonov (Ukrainian: Андрій Анатолійович Аксьонов; born February 2, 1971) is a member of the Verkhovna Rada, the national parliament of Ukraine. He joined the 9th Ukrainian Verkhovna Rada on May 19, 2021.

== Biography ==
He received higher education, he graduated from the Donetsk State Technical University.

== Political career ==
From 2008 to 2014, he was the mayor of the village of Novodonetske settlement hromada in the Kramatorsk Raion. During his time in office as mayor, the War in Donbas started, during which the Donetsk People's Republic started to gain control over some of the villages in the Donetsk Oblast. As mayor, according to some witnesses and videos, he allowed voting for the 2014 Donbas status referendums (which was held by the DPR), despite the villages not yet being occupied. He later defended his actions, stating they were the "will of the people".

In 2015–2020, he was the mayor of the town of Dobropillya. He first announced his candidacy for the position in early October 2015. During the 2015 Ukrainian local elections, which were held on 25 October 2015, he won 69% of the vote as a self-nominated candidate not affiliated with a political party. According to Babel he was very popular in the village for the development of international trade within the region, which led to a significant increase in the quality of life through funding by the oligarch Rinat Akhmetov of DTEK. From January to April 2019, however, he was temporarily removed from the post on the orders of the Kramatorsk City Court, having earlier been on house arrest. This stemmed from him being a suspect in the embezzlement of budget funds and forgery including forgery of documents to visit occupied Crimea, and was put on the wanted list in May 2018. Afterwards, he left for medical leave to Germany, but returned in the winter of 2019 and immediately received a punishment of nightly hhouse arrest, and was then suspended from being mayor of Dobropillya for several months. In 2021, he was again elected as the mayor of Dobropillya having gained 58% of voters in the election. He attempted to run for a seat as a people's deputy in the 2019 Ukrainian parliamentary election, but took second place behind Ruslan Trebushkin of the Opposition Bloc.

On March 28, 2021, he was elected as a people's deputy at the intermediate by-elections to the Verkhovna Rada in the Donetsk region in the 50th district. The candidate for people's deputies from the "Poryadok" party. During his campaign, he created a program called the "Miner's Character", which consisted of the points that he would not close mines and factories, reduce energy tariffs, bring the minimum old-age pension to the level of the minimum miners' pension, and to demand the government to resolve the ongoing War in the Donbas. The program was first introduced in 2020, and was supported by Leonid Baysarov, the head of the regional branch of Poryadok in Donetsk. A memorandum was signed in 2021 between the Association of Coal Cities and a French company called BETEN Ingenierie International, wherein the company would ensure water safety in the region due to mining, with BETEN being chosen because it had past experience in solving water purification issues. He is the member of the group of inter-parliamentary associations in Hungary and Germany in the rada.

Aksyonov's term as People's Deputy of Ukraine was terminated by parliament on 13 January 2023. Aksyonov voluntarily ended his mandate, and did not cite a reason why.

== Personal life ==
Aksyonov is married and has four children. He lives in the village of Novodonetske. According to the European Solidarity party, he received a Russian passport in 2014 whiile visiting Sevastopol in Crimea, however the SBU later stated they did not possess evidence that he had acquired citizenship.
