= Donetsk Metallurgical Plant =

Ukrainian industrial site

- Donetskstal

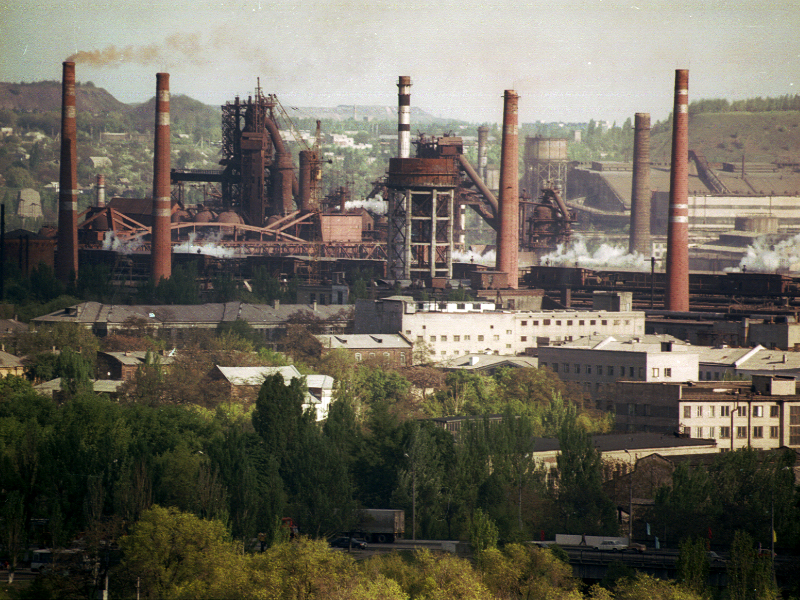
- Company type: PJSC
- Founded: 1872
- Headquarters: Donetsk, Ivan Tkachenko Street, 122, Ukraine
- Key people: President: Alexander Nikolayevich Ryzhenkov, General Director: Sergey Anatolyevich Zinchenko
- Products: Iron and steel industry (Ferrous metallurgy), cast iron products
- Number of employees: 25,000 (1917)
- Parent: Pokrovs'ke coal mine administration and Svyato-Varvarinskaya
- Website: Donetskstal

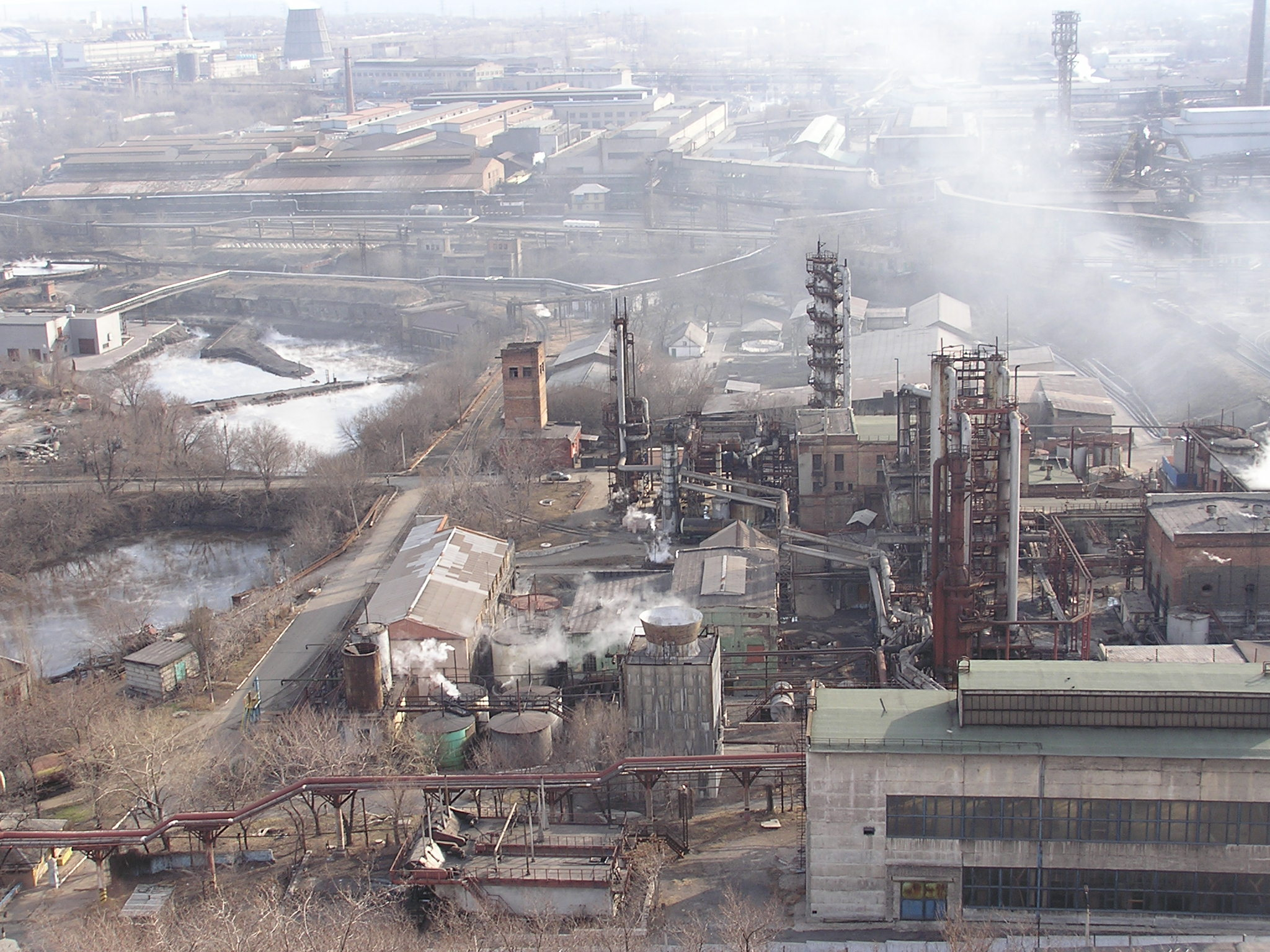
Donetsk Metallurgical Plant

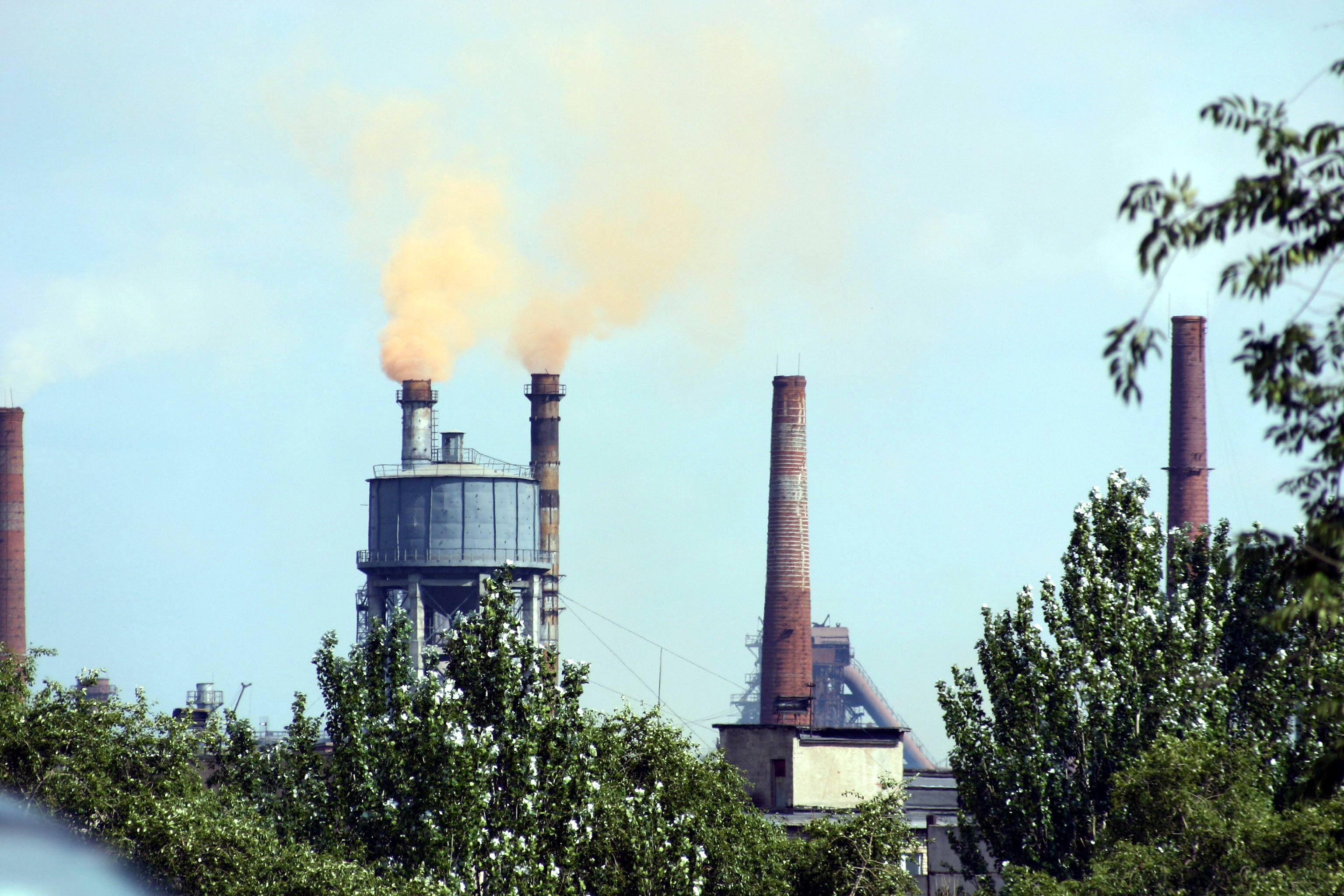
DMZ (DMP)

Donetsk Metallurgical Plant also called Donetsk Iron and Steel Works is an enterprise of Donetsk, Ukraine. It is a ferrous metallurgy enterprise that is located in the Leninskyi district of Donetsk.

== History ==
=== 1869–1917 ===
In 1866, the government of the Russian Empire concluded an agreement with Prince Sergey Victorovich Kochubey, according to which the prince undertook to build a plant for the manufacture of iron rails in the south of the Russian Empire. In 1869, Kochubey sold the enterprise to John Hughes for £24,000.

In 1869, Hughes (or Yuz) began the construction of a metallurgical plant with a working settlement near the village of Aleksandrovka.

On April 24, 1871, the first blast furnace was built and on January 24, 1872, the plant of the Novorossiysk Society for Coal, Iron and Rail Production produced the first pig iron.

In the "Mining Journal" for 1889, the oldest plan of the NRO plant was published. In addition to the location of industrial facilities, this plan also shows the first, one-story house of John Hughes, built by the Hughes family in 1874. Now this place is located on the territory of a metallurgical plant, near the administrative building of the electric steel smelting and swaging shops, next to the monument "In honor of the smelting of the 100 millionth ton of steel on December 24, 1967."

In 1901, a social-democratic circle was created at the plant. The factory workers took an active part in the First Russian Revolution of 1905.

The plant worked as a full metallurgical cycle. For the first time in the Russian Empire 8 coke ovens are launched. Hot blast is mastered. The plant became one of the industrial centers of the Russian Empire.

In 1908–1913, 1916–1917, the outstanding metallurgist Mikhail Konstantinovich Kurako worked at the plant.

In 1917, 25 thousand people worked at the plant, mines, and mines of the society.

On March 5 (18), 1917, the Council of Workers' Deputies was created in Yuzovka, which included factory workers, after which an 8-hour working day was established at the enterprise . In the autumn of 1917, workers' control was established at the enterprise, attempts by the plant administration to stop the enterprise were suppressed, coal mining and production continued. A detachment of factory workers was sent to fight Kaledin. The workers of the plant later on took an active part in the establishment of Soviet power in the Donbas.

=== 1918–1941 ===
In April 1918, after the attack of German-Austrian troops, most of the equipment and materials of the Yuzovsky plant were evacuated to Tsaritsyn (Volgograd), and detachments of workers retreated with the Red Army.

On May 24, 1918, the plant was nationalized.

In May 1918, during the German occupation, an underground organization of the Russian Communist Party bolsheviks or the RCP(b), led by E. Severyanov, began operating at the plant, and in July 1918 an underground regional committee of six members began operating at the plant.

In December 1919, Soviet power was restored in Yuzovka, on January 30, 1920, a workers' board of all enterprises of the former "Novorossiysk Society of Coal, Iron and Rail Production" (headed by M. S. Titov) was created in Yuzovka, and the restoration of the plant began. On July 6, 1921, the first blast furnace was launched again, by the end of 1921, production at the plant was restored.

In 1924, the plant was named after Joseph Vissarionovich Stalin.

During Industrialization in the Soviet Union, the plant was transformed into a new technical base. During the First Five-Year Plan, mechanization of the mill and a bunker system for blast furnace charging were introduced and technical renovation was initiated; in 1936 the reconstruction of the mill and the construction of the flat furnace mill were completed, the plate and profilerolling mills were mechanized and a new, powerful blooming mill replaced the old rail-rolling mill.

=== Under German occupation ===
During the Eastern Front (World War II) or the Great Patriotic War, the plant was almost completely destroyed (immediately before the start of the battles for the liberation of the city, on September 6–7, 1943. The underground workers operating at the plant, led by I.I. Kholoshin, including prisoners of war and assistants from the factory guards, disarmed the factory guards, occupied and saved warehouses, a garage, a telephone exchange and a special factory workshop from destruction).. Already in the fall of 1943, the restoration of the plant began. After the end of the war the plant was reconstructed and expanded.

=== Restoration ===
The restoration of the plant began immediately after the end of the battles for the city, and on February 14, 1944, the plant carried out the first steel smelting from the flat furnace; in March 1944, the rolling mill and the first blast furnace were put into operation; between 1944 and 1946, the enterprise was awarded the Red flag ten times by the Soviet Defense Committee for the successful restoration of the facility.

Dear Joseph Vissarionovich!
The workers of the Stalin Metallurgical Plant in Donbass, inspired by the victorious offensive of the Red Army, collected 1,400,000 rubles from their personal funds for the defense fund of our beloved Motherland. We ask you to spend these funds on the construction of the Metallurg of Donbass air squadron and transfer it to the 4th Ukrainian Front, whose troops liberated our native Donbass, the city of Stalino and the plant from the fascist yoke.
Director of the plant ANDREEV.
District Committee Secretary of the CP(b) LEBEDEV.
Party Organizer of the Central Committee of the CPSU (b) at plant VANSYATSKY.
Chairman of the factory committee KIRYUSHIN.

I ask you to convey to the workers of the Stalin Metallurgical Plant, who raised 1,400,000 rubles for the construction of the Metallurg of Donbass air squadron, my brotherly greetings and gratitude to the Red Army. May the desires of the workers of the Stalin Metallurgical Plant be fulfilled.
J. STALIN
"Pravda" Newspaper, March 19, 1944.

In 1950, the plant returned to prewar levels of steel production and rolled metal production.

In 1952, the plant was the first in the world to implement a steam evaporation system for cooling flat furnace elements, the development and implementation of which earned two employees of the plant the Stalin Prize.

The plant also specialized in the production of strip valve profiles and spring strips for Pobeda cars in the Fourth Five-Year Plan.

In 1955, the Museum of the History of the DMZ (DMP) was opened.

In 1960, a four-jet continuous casting machine for steel blanks was put into operation at the plant. Also, in 1960, the plant, among the first enterprises of the USSR, mastered the smelting of iron on natural gas (for this achievement, the director of the plant I. M. Ektov and the head of the blast furnace shop of the plant G. A. Panev were awarded the Lenin Prize in 1960).

February 7, 1966 the plant was awarded the Order of Lenin.

In 1967, the plant received a new name: “named after V. I. Lenin.”

In 1970, the plant produced 5.9 times more iron, 5.3 times more steel, and produced 5.5 times more rolled metal than in 1913. Also, in 1970, the Living Memorial was built - immortal, in honor of the workers of the DMZ who died in the Great Patriotic War.

In 1972, the plant was awarded the Order of the October Revolution.

In 1974, a swaging mill 950/900 was built at the plant.

From the early 1980s, DMZ'smain products were rolled bars and rolled sheets of cast iron, steel, high-grade and alloy steel.

By early 1986, the plant was one of the largest industrial enterprises in Donetsk, whose main products were steel, cast iron, sheet metal and long products.

=== 1991–2013 ===
In August 1997, the plant was included in the list of enterprises of strategic importance for the economy and security of Ukraine.

In 1998, for the first time, the plant was certified as a manufacturer of steel and semi-finished products from it (slabs and open-hearth ingots from carbon and carbon-manganese steel grades of normal and increased strength) according to the rules of the English Lloyd's Register.

In August 2002, on the basis of the blast-furnace and open-hearth shops of the Donetsk Metallurgical Plant, the Donetskstal Metallurgical Plant PJSC was established. The company specializes in the production of:

- foundry and pig iron
- more than 100 varieties of carbon, structural, low-alloyed, alloyed ordinary quality, high-quality and high-quality steel grades
- church bells made of non-ferrous high-quality alloy
- steel electric-welded longitudinal pipes and metal furniture frames
- slag-forming mixtures, granulated slag and building materials

Slabs made of normal strength marine structural steel grades GL-A and GL-B are certified according to the rules of Deutsche Lloyd.

In 2003, the church of St. Ignatius of Mariupol was built on the territory of the plant.

The plant completed 2013 with a net profit of UAH 83.322 million.

=== Since 2014 ===
The outbreak of hostilities in eastern Ukraine in 2014 complicated the activities of the enterprise. As a result, the plant ended 2014 with a net loss of UAH 4,871.533 million. In the first nine months of 2015, the plant produced 426 thousand tons of pig iron and 1.664 million tons of grade K coal concentrate, but losses continued to increase.

In June 2016, the leadership of the unrecognized DPR introduced external management at the plant, by which time its communications and a significant part of the equipment had become unusable due to repeated shutdowns and long downtime.

Also in June 2016, on the basis of the Donetsk Electrometallurgical Plant (DEMP), the state enterprise Yuzovsky Metallurgical Plant was opened. The YuMZ industrial complex is located on the same territory as the Donetsk Metallurgical Plant, which, in turn, is located in three districts of the DPR capital at once - Voroshilovsky, Budenovsky, Leninsk.

It was Re-launched on October 5, 2017.

In 2018 YuMZ began to supply products to Turkey, Iran and Syria.

Since May 1, 2019, blast-furnace production has been stopped. The company does not manufacture products. During the heating period of 2019–2020, only the factory CHPP-PVS and related power plants worked, in order to supply heat to part of the above three districts of the city of Donetsk.

From March to August 2020, the plant suspended work due to a shortage of raw materials. As of November 2020, the YuMZ complex, separated from the main part of the plant, continues to produce steel, specializing in the production of continuously cast square billets. The workforce consists of 858 people.

At the DMZ, there are energy workshops that provide transit and supply to factory consumers and sub-consumers of drinking and industrial water, electricity, natural gas, steam and hot water.

== Museum ==
The Museum of the History of Donetsk Metallurgical Plant was created in 1955, and it is located in the Technology House. The idea for its creation came from the director of the DMZ, Pavel Vasilyevich Andreev. The museum consists of more than 3000 exhibits. In 1971 the museum was awarded the title of national museum. Among the exhibits are certificates for products manufactured by the plant in 1900, original photographs of the Nizhny Novgorod industrial exhibition in 1896 and others.

On February 16, 2012, a branch of the Museum of the History of the Donetsk Metallurgical Plant was opened in the lower floor of the St. Ignatius Church, which is dedicated to Ignatius of Mariupol.

== "City of Smiles" ==
On June 17, 2004, a children's playground "City of Smiles" was opened in the park area of the plant. In the "City of Smiles" a sports area and playground, a railway for children, as well as a zoo were arranged, which contained a mouflon, a Bactrian camel, a pony, a donkey, a collared peccary, a raccoon, a red-headed duck, a chubataya duck, a mandarin duck, a wood duck, a pechanka, a Muscovy duck, a common pochard, a coypu, a rhea ostrich, a bush wallabi, a macaque monkey, a rhesus monkey, a Romanian pheasant, a trogopan pheasant, chickens, a golden pheasant, a royal pheasant, a common peacock, a guinea fowl, gray nymphs, rose-ringed parakeets, a demoiselle crane, kings, strassers, pigeons, pectoral sandpiper, trumpeters, a porcupine, a Cameroon goat, a llama, a spotted deer, a European fallow deer, a Barbary sheep, a savannah zebra, and an American bison.

== Awards ==
- Order of Lenin
- Order of the October Revolution

== Gallery ==
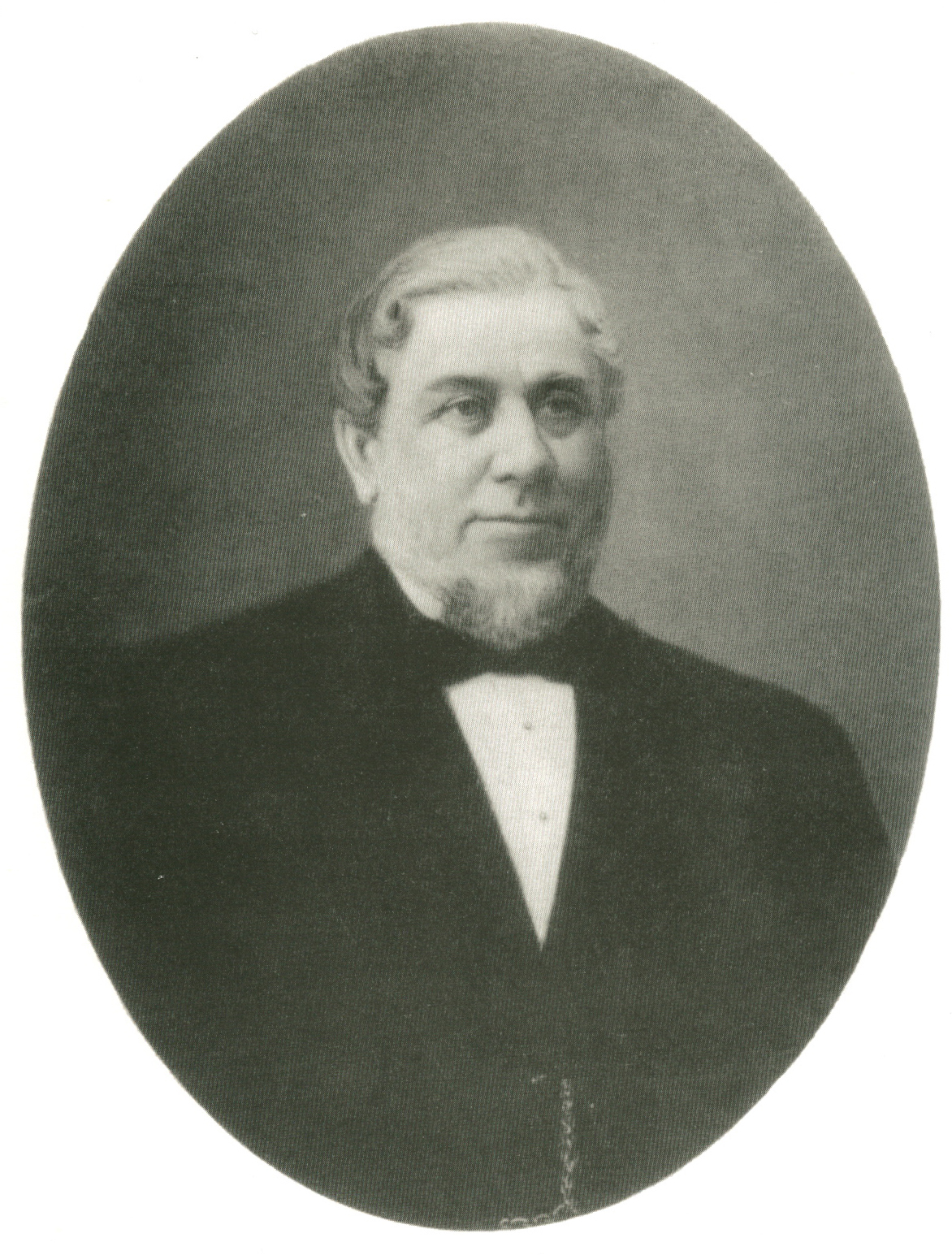
John James Hughes

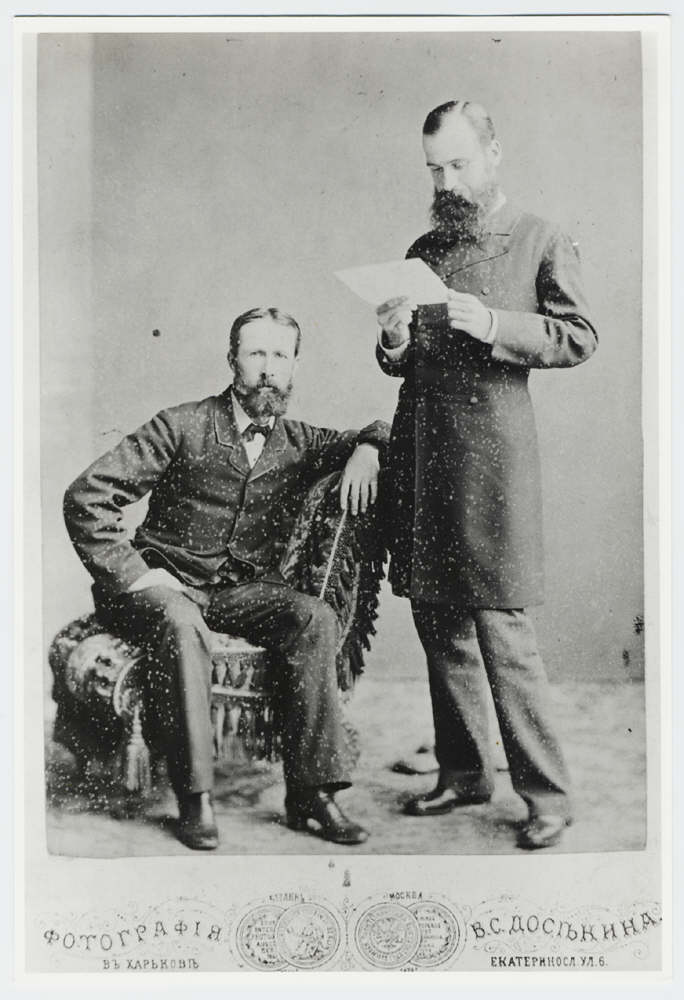
Photo by Vasily Dosekin: Sons of John Hughes: John James Hughes Jr. (sitting) and Iver Hughes - Managing Directors of the Yuzovsky Plant of the Novorossiysk Society.

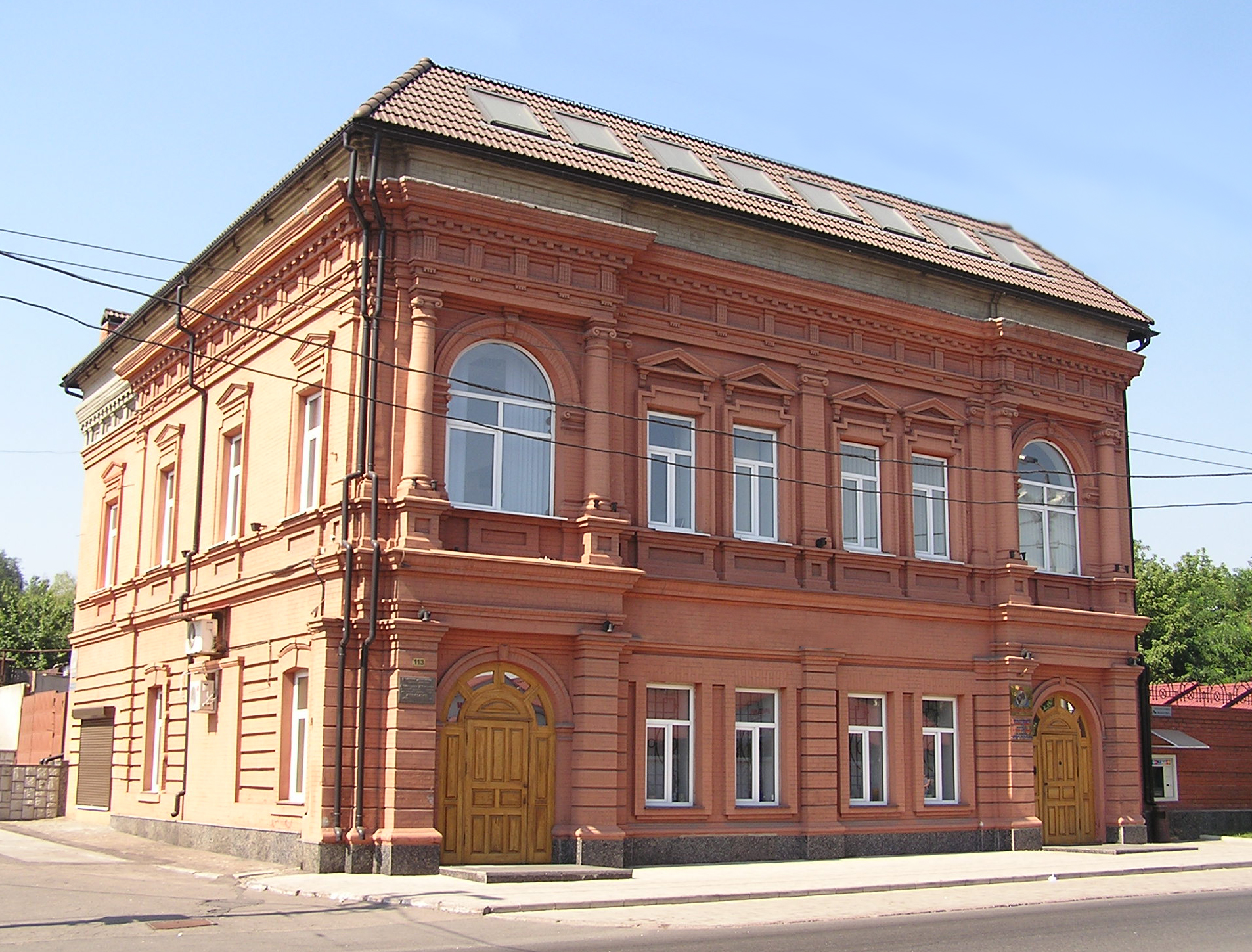
School for children of the English administration of the Yuzovsky metallurgical plant

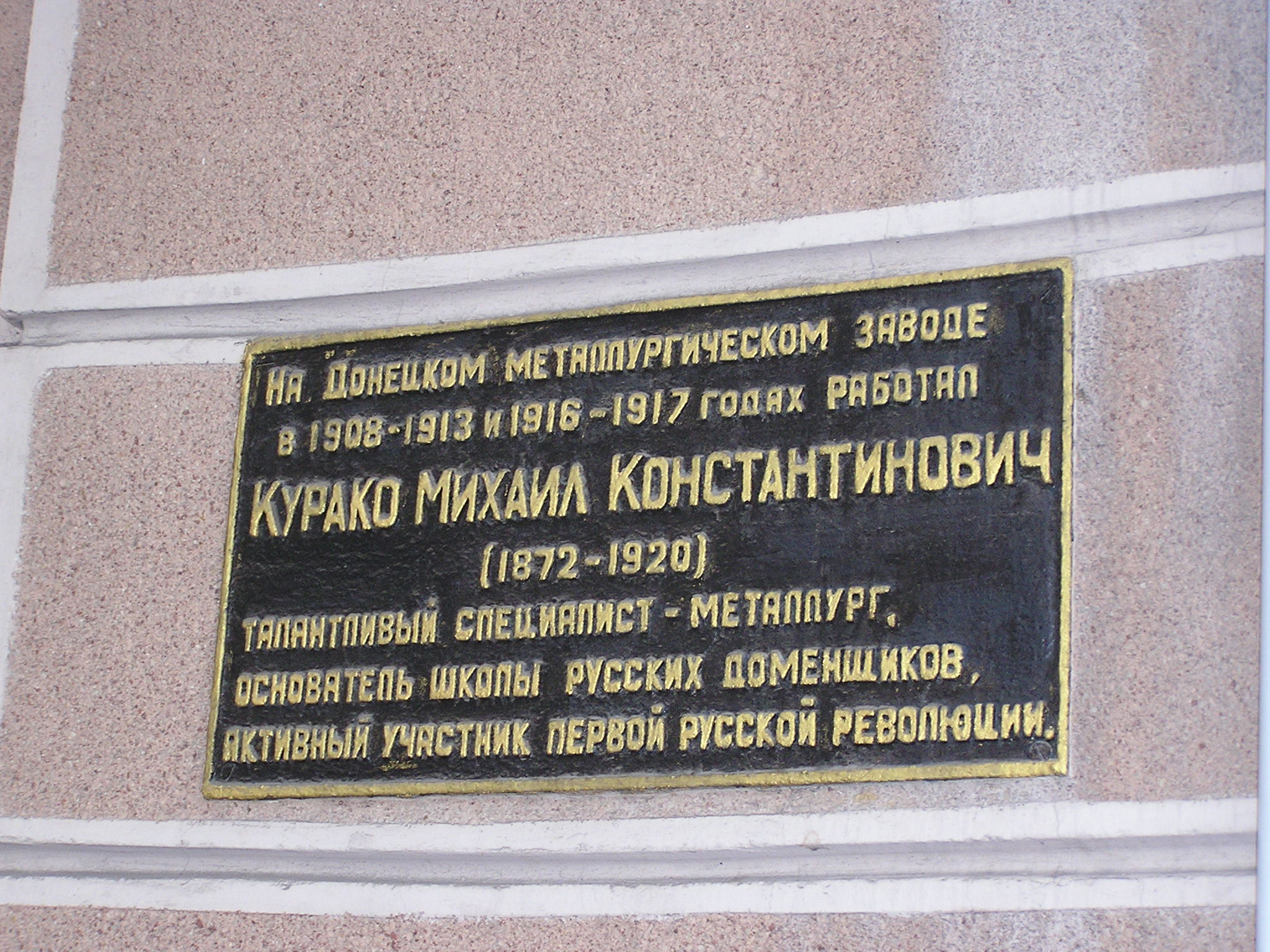
Memorial plaque in honor of M. K. Kurako on the DMZ (DMP) equipment building

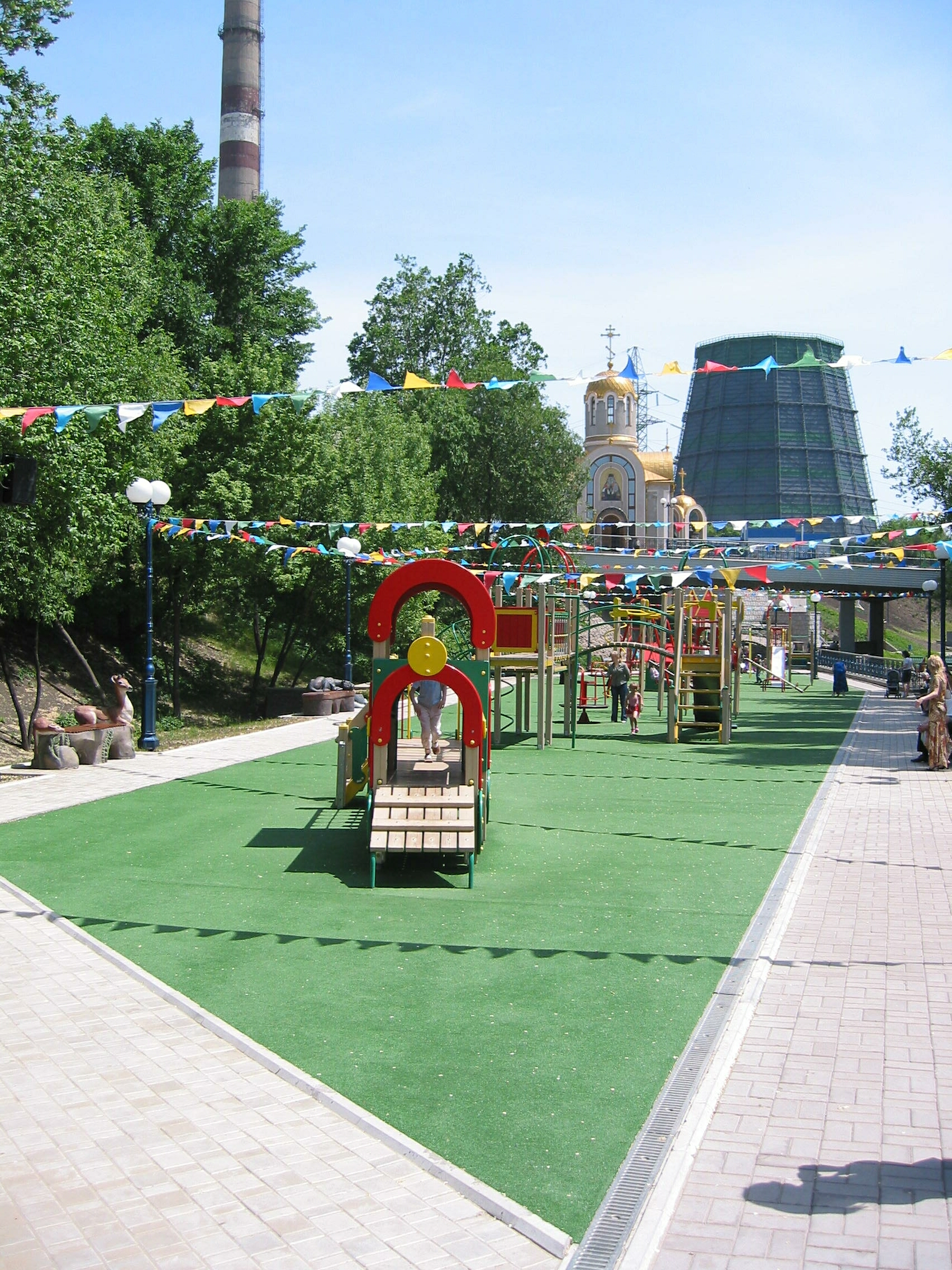
"City of Smiles" Park
