= Concern =

Concern may refer to:

== Constructs ==
- Worry, an emotion
- Concern (computer science), an abstract concept about program behavior

== Enterprises and organizations ==
- Concern (business), a German type of group company
- Concern (organisation), a student society at the Indian Institute of Science, India
- CONCERN Program, a Con Edison program that offers eligible customers a specially trained representative and advice about government aid programs, safety tips, and ways to save money on one's energy bill
- Concern Worldwide, an Irish charity

== Other uses ==
- Concern (horse), an American Thoroughbred racehorse

== See also ==
- Care (disambiguation)
- Concerned, a webcomic parodying the video game Half-Life 2
- Travel concerns travel guide from Wikivoyage
