= Pokrovske coal mine =

Coal mine in Donetsk, Ukraine

Coordinates: 48°15′33″N 36°59′38″E

- Interactive map of Pokrovske coal mine
- Location: Pokrovsk, Donetsk Oblast, Ukraine
- Products: Coal
- Production: 3,490,000
- Opened: 1990
- Company: Shakhtoupravlinnia Pokrovske (Pokrovske Coal Company, private joint-stock company)

The Pokrovske coal mine is a large coal mine located in the south-east of Ukraine in Donetsk Oblast. Pokrovske coal mine represents one of the largest coal reserves in Ukraine having estimated reserves of 79.5 million tonnes. The annual coal production is around 3.49 million tonnes.

It is owned by private joint-stock company Shakhtoupravlinnia Pokrovske (Pokrovske Coal Company).

On December 12, 2024 the holding company of the mine, Metinvest B.V., announced that the mine's production site in Pishchane (Shaft No. 3, 6 miles south east of the main coal mine), that provided around half of Metinvest’s total Ukrainian coal extraction volumes, suspended operation due to Russia's military Pokrovsk offensive.

On January 14, 2025 Metinvest announced that the Pokrovske coal mine suspended operation due to the deteriorating security situation for employees. According to The New York Times, "the mine’s closure is expected to send shock waves through the economy. Steel production is projected to drop by more than half, from 7.5 million tons this year to less than 3 million next year, according to Oleksandr Kalenkov, head of Ukraine’s steel makers’ association."

== See also ==
- Coal in Ukraine
- List of mines in Ukraine
