= List of strikes in Ukraine =

Throughout the history of Ukraine, a number of strikes, labour disputes, student strikes, hunger strikes, and other industrial actions have occurred.

== Background ==
A labour strike is a work stoppage caused by the mass refusal of employees to work. This can include wildcat strikes, which are done without union authorisation, and slowdown strikes, where workers reduce their productivity while still carrying out minimal working duties. It is usually a response to employee grievances, such as low pay or poor working conditions. Strikes can also occur to demonstrate solidarity with workers in other workplaces or pressure governments to change policies.

== 20th century ==
=== 1910s ===
- 1918 Ukrainian rail strike, against German occupation of Ukraine, part of the Ukrainian War of Independence.

=== 1980s ===
- 1990s Donbas miners' strikes, series of strikes from 1989 to 1998 by coal miners in the Donbas region of the Ukrainian Soviet Socialist Republic and subsequently in independent Ukraine.
- 1989–1991 Ukrainian revolution

=== 1990s ===
- 1990 Ukrainian student hunger strike, pro-democracy hunger strike by students in the Ukrainian Soviet Socialist Republic.
- 1996 Ukrainian miner protests

== 21st century ==
=== 2000s ===
- Ukraine without Kuchma, protests in 2000, including strikes, against the government of Leonid Kuchma, following the Cassette Scandal.

=== 2020s ===
- 2020 Ukrainian miners' strikes

== See also ==
- Modern history of Ukraine
