= Mykhailo Volynets =

Ukrainian trade unionist and politician

- Михайло Волинець
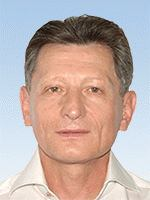
- Official portrait, 2019

People's Deputy of Ukraine
- Incumbent
- Assumed office 29 August 2019
- Constituency: Batkivshchyna, No. 20
- In office 23 November 2007 – 12 December 2012
- Constituency: Yulia Tymoshenko Bloc, No. 15
- In office 31 March 2002 – 12 June 2007
- Constituency: Yulia Tymoshenko Bloc, No. 14

Personal details
- Born: 30 October 1956 (age 69) Novozhyvotiv, Ukrainian SSR, Soviet Union
- Party: Independent
- Other political affiliations: Batkivshchyna (since 2019); Yulia Tymoshenko Bloc (2002–2012)
- Education: Donbas State Technical University
- Occupation: Coal miner; trade unionist

Military service
- Allegiance: Soviet Union
- Branch/service: Soviet Army
- Years of service: 1975–1977

Mykhailo Yakovych Volynets (Ukrainian: Михайло Якович Волинець; born 30 October 1956) is a Ukrainian trade unionist and politician currently serving as a People's Deputy of Ukraine on the electoral list of the Batkivshchyna party since 2019, having previously been a deputy from the electoral list of the Yulia Tymoshenko Bloc between 2002 and 2012, barring a brief period in 2007. He is the chairman of the Confederation of Free Trade Unions of Ukraine, one of Ukraine's two trade union federations, as well as the Independent Trade Union of Ukrainian Miners.

== Early life and career ==
Mykhailo Yakovych Volynets was born 30 October 1956 in the village of Novozhyvotiv, in Ukraine's central Vinnytsia Oblast under what was then the Soviet Union. From 1974 to 1975 he studied mining in the city of Dymytrov (now Myrnohrad), and he served in the Soviet Army as a conscript from 1975 to 1977 before becoming an officer in the Soviet military reserves.

After being demobilised, Volynets worked at A. Stakhanov coal mine, near Krasnoarmiisk (now Kapitalna coal mine, near Pokrovsk) from 1977. He was a deputy of the Krasnoarmiisk city council from 1983, serving two terms. Volynets is a graduate of the Komunarsk Institute of Mining and Metallurgy (now the Donbas State Technical University) with a specialisation in mine engineering and electromechanics.

== Trade unionism ==
In 1984, Volynets travelled to Wales, where he was part of an international group of miners from the Soviet Union, Germany and Italy supporting the 1984–1985 United Kingdom miners' strike. Speaking to striking miners, Volynets recounted in 2024 that he came to the realisation that he "lived in a country without truth", and resolved to establish a trade union in Ukraine similar to the British National Union of Mineworkers. Upon his return to Ukraine, Volynets was appointed head of the trade union committee at Stakhanov coal mine in 1985.

Volynets was a prominent figure during the 1989–1991 Ukrainian revolution and the 1990s Donbas miners' strikes, leading the first committee of striking workers in Krasnoarmiisk. Internet news publication galinfo has claimed that Volynets was a KGB agent during the revolution, being planted by the Fifth Directorate of the Ukrainian KGB in order to control the strikes, claiming that he used the codename "Woland". Volynets stated that this codename was used by the Security Service of Ukraine (Ukrainian: Служба безпеки України, romanised: Sluzhba bezpeky Ukrainy, abbreviated SBU) during the presidency of Leonid Kuchma, which he says surveilled him and accused him of seeking to overthrow the government. Volynets was head of the A. Stakhanov Inter-Regional Association of Trade Unions, a consortium of striking unions, in 1991, and was appointed as chairman of the Confederation of Free Trade Unions of Ukraine (Ukrainian: Конфедерація вільних профспілок України, romanised: Konfederatsiia vilnykh profspilok Ukrainy, KVPU) in 1997.

Volynets became head of the Independent Trade Union of Ukrainian Miners (Ukrainian: Незалежна профспілка гірників України, romanised: Nezalezhna profspilka hirnykiv Ukrainy, NPHU), one of the most militant trade unions in Ukraine, in 2003. Volynets, as well as his family members, were subjected to violence under Kuchma's government due to his trade union activism: Volynets told the BBC in 2024 that Kuchma's government issued an "order to kill me and my family", while his son Andrii was kidnapped on 7 March 2004 and beaten by members of the SBU. According to Volynets, Andrii was also force-fed alcohol and injected with drugs before being falsely declared as dead. Volynets was beaten by riot police in a separate incident. Volynets was one of the leaders of the Tax Maidan protests in 2010, seeking snap parliamentary elections, the resignation of the First Azarov government and the protection of small businesses from its proposed tax code.

In his capacity as head of the KVPU, Volynets lent support to protesters during Euromaidan, in contrast to the opposing Federation of Trade Unions of Ukraine (Ukrainian: Федерація профспілок України, romanised: Federatsiia profspilok Ukrainy, FPU), which largely refused to support or oppose the uprising. Volynets argued that the aims of trade unions were fundamentally different from those of politicians in opposition to the government of Viktor Yanukovych, with the former advocating increased wages (especially the minimum wage) and the abolition of neoliberal reforms to the Ukrainian pension system, while the latter primarily sought snap elections to remove Yanukovych and constitutional reform. Other strike actions supported by Volynets include the 2020 Ukrainian miners' strikes, during which Volynets accused the Ministry of Energy of failing to pay ₴2 billion worth of wages to coal miners. Volynets and the KVPU are closely aligned with the International Labour Organization. Academic Denys Gorbach has criticised Volynets's leveraging of his ILO connections, as well as his general role in the KVPU and the NPHU, arguing that Volynets has centralised power around himself to the detriment of union organisation. According to members of the FPU who infiltrated the KVPU, Volynets has conversely argued that without his leadership the KVPU would collapse.

During the Russo-Ukrainian war, Volynets lent support to a 2023 strike by the GMB trade union at a factory producing Storm Shadow and Brimstone missiles in Beith, Scotland, urging employers to negotiate immediately. Volynets has provided humanitarian support to villages destroyed by the Russian military during the war.

== Political career ==
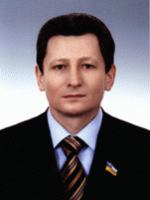
Volynets's first official portrait in the Verkhovna Rada, 2002

Volynets first ran in the 1998 Ukrainian parliamentary election on the electoral list of the minor Party of Spiritual, Economic and Social Progress, and was not elected. He also unsuccessfully ran in a 2000 by-election in Ukraine's 36th electoral district (located in Dnipropetrovsk Oblast) as an independent. In the 2002 Ukrainian parliamentary election, he was elected as the fourteenth-placed candidate on the electoral list of the Yulia Tymoshenko Bloc. While Volynets was not a member of the bloc, nor is he a member of its successor party, Batkivshchyna, he has sat in the parliamentary group associated with Yulia Tymoshenko since his 2002 election. The Rosa Luxemburg Foundation has described Tymoshenko as Volynets's patron. He was re-elected at the 2006 Ukrainian parliamentary election before resigning his seat on 12 June 2007. He was again re-elected at the 2007 Ukrainian parliamentary election, this time 15th on the Yulia Tymoshenko Bloc's electoral list. In the 2012 Ukrainian parliamentary election, Volynets was placed at the 85th position on the Yulia Tymoshenko Bloc's electoral list; he was not elected. In the 2019 Ukrainian parliamentary election, he was returned to the Verkhovna Rada (Ukrainian parliament) as the 20th candidate on the electoral list of Batkivshchyna.

Volynets voted against the legalisation of medical cannabis and for the Law "On the Protection of the Constitutional Order in the Field of Activities of Religious Organisations". He is a member of the Verkhovna Rada Energy and Communal Services Committee, having previously been a member of the Committee on the Fuel and Energy Complex, Nuclear Policy and Nuclear Safety.

Volynets has been involved in several fist-fights with other politicians. In a 13 July 2018 incident, he grabbed minister of energy Ihor Nasalyk by the collar during an altercation between Nasalyk and miners amidst a picket action at the Ministry of Energy building in Kyiv. In another case, he suffered a skull fracture as a result of a scuffle between deputies in the Verkhovna Rada building.

=== Exclusion from Batkivshchyna (2014–2019) ===
In the 2014 Ukrainian parliamentary election, Volynets was excluded from the electoral list of Tymoshenko's Batkivshchyna party. The apparent end of patronage from Tymoshenko led Volynets to seek alternative means to apply political pressure on the government. In 2016, he appointed an affiliate of the neo-Nazi Azov movement as deputy chairman of the KVPU, drawing condemnation from international trade union groups aligned to the KVPU. During this time, Volynets also worked as a parliamentary secretary to Pavlo Kyshkar of the Self Reliance party.

As a result of this criticism, the KVPU abandoned its efforts to build a relationship with the Azov movement. Volynets has additionally been accused by the Rosa Luxemburg Foundation and transparency-focused non-governmental organisation Chesno of working under Rinat Akhmetov, a Ukrainian oligarch and the leader of the Donetsk Clan network. During the 2020 Ukrainian miners' strikes Volynets condemned rival oligarch Ihor Kolomoyskyi's Privat Group (a co-owner in Kryvyi Rih Iron Ore Combine) as responsible for the industrial dispute while downplaying the role of Akhmetov's Metinvest, arguing that Metinvest was a pro-worker company seeking to encourage shareholders to accept concessions to striking miners.

=== Corruption investigation ===
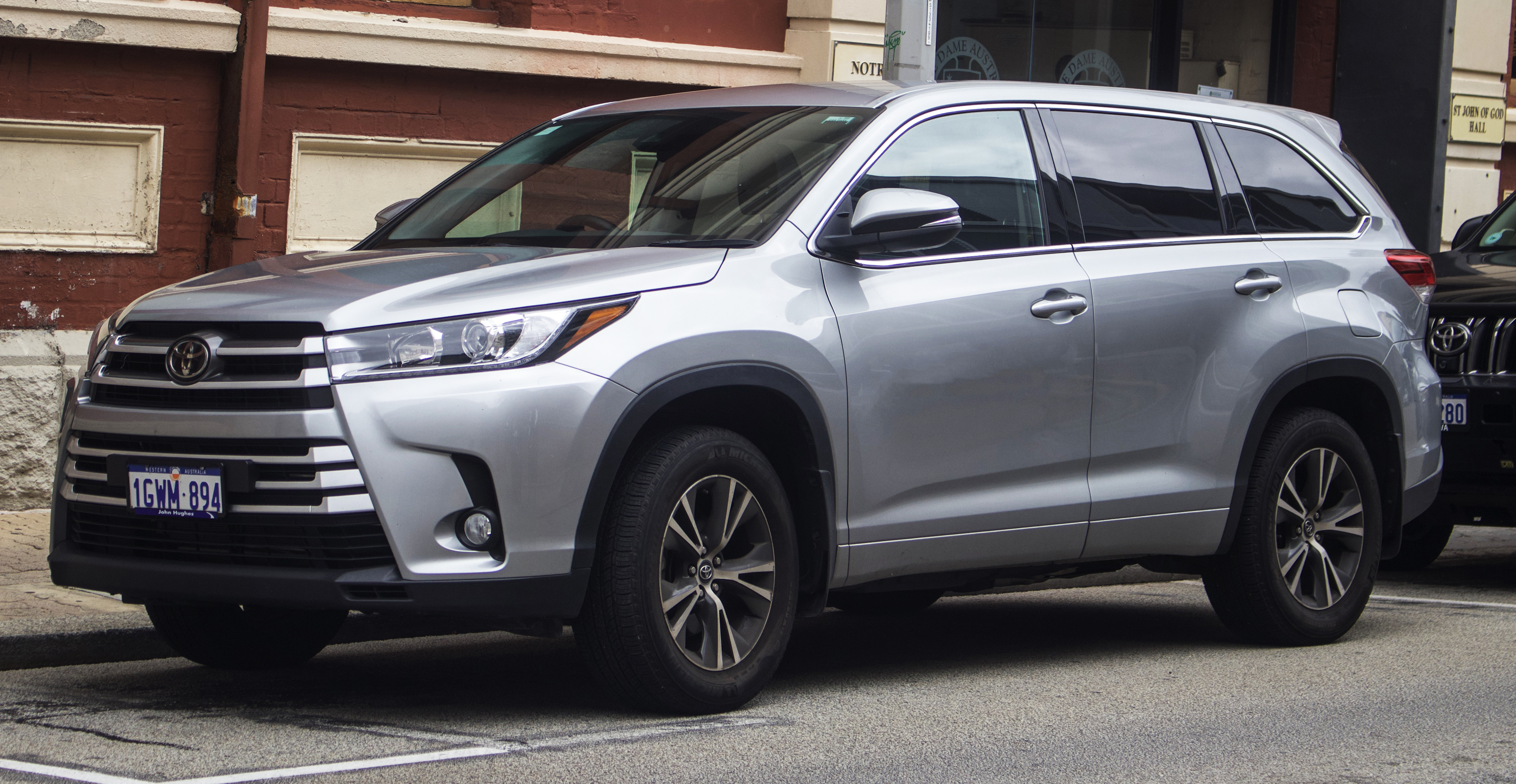
A Toyota Highlander SUV similar to the one Volynets was accused of illegally failing to declare usage of in a 2021 investigation

In early 2021, a joint investigation by the Ukrainian service of Radio Free Europe/Radio Liberty and television channel Pershyi found that Volynets had failed to declare a Toyota Highlander luxury SUV worth over one million Ukrainian hryvnias, registered to his son, as being used by him in his 2019 or 2020 income declarations. Further investigations by RFE/RL and Pershyi accused Volynets of illegally concealing the source of ₴3 million used to purchase a flat in Pecherskyi District, Kyiv and two parking spaces in a 2020 declaration of income submitted to the Verkhovna Rada. In response to questions from journalists, Volynets claimed that the source of the funds was "the woman, with whom [he] lives" and that it was "optional" to include her income in the declaration. It is unclear whether this statement meant his wife or another woman, though RFE/RL cited unnamed anti-corruption experts as noting that Volynets was legally obligated to provide the assets of his common-law wife if they were not separated. Volynets later also claimed that he had purchased the flat with savings, though these were also undeclared.

The Specialised Anti-Corruption Prosecutor's Office (SAPO) requested that the High Anti-Corruption Court of Ukraine order the confiscation of Volynets's flat as state revenue and evidence in an investigation of Volynets falsifying his income declaration, a measure that the High Anti-Corruption Court agreed on 28 July 2021 to consider the next month. A warrant for Volynets's arrest was issued by the National Anti-Corruption Bureau of Ukraine (NABU) and SAPO on 17 November 2022, on the charge of falsifying his declaration by failing to declare his usage of the Toyota Highlander for over six months.

Volynets first claimed to have been hospitalised in Kyiv after being given a court summons before later stating in February 2023 that he had not received a summons and that he had been hospitalised with a life-threatening disease in Geneva, Switzerland. On 7 April of that year the High Anti-Corruption Court closed the case, noting that the statute of limitations of two years had expired before the trial could begin. Volynets subsequently returned to Ukraine.

On 22 July 2025, Volynets voted in favour of Draft Law 12414, which was criticised by Chesno for "effectively destroying" the independence of NABU and SAPO by placing their activities at the discretion of the Prosecutor General of Ukraine; this law led to the 2025 anti-corruption protests in Ukraine.
