= Timeline of strikes in 1996 =

Strikes in 1996

In 1996, a number of labour strikes, labour disputes, and other industrial actions occurred.

== Background ==
A labour strike is a work stoppage caused by the mass refusal of employees to work. This can include wildcat strikes, which are done without union authorisation, and slowdown strikes, where workers reduce their productivity while still carrying out minimal working duties. It is usually a response to employee grievances, such as low pay or poor working conditions. Strikes can also occur to demonstrate solidarity with workers in other workplaces or pressure governments to change policies.

== Timeline ==
=== Continuing strikes from 1995 ===
- Detroit newspaper strike of 1995–1997
- 1990s Donbas miners' strikes
- Liverpool dockers' dispute (1995–1998)

=== January ===
- 1996 Haikou taxi strike, strike by taxi drivers in Haikou, China, after a taxi driver was killed by soldiers.

=== February ===
- Hamilton Action Days, general strike in Hamilton, Ontario, Canada, against the government of Mike Harris.
- 1996 Oakland teachers' strike
- 1996 Ontario public sector strike, against the government of Mike Harris.
- 1996 UK postal strike
- 1996 Ukrainian miner protests

=== March ===
- 1996 Bucharest Metro strike
- 1996 Serie A strike, strike by Serie A football players in Italy.
- 1996 Parisian undocumented migrants movement, fr, including a hunger strike.

=== April ===
- 1996 German public sector strike, against austerity.
- 1996 Norwegian oil strike
- 1996 SaskTel strike, 3-week strike by SaskTel workers in Canada.
- 1996 Sri Lankan plantations' strike

=== May ===
- 1996 Chuquicamata strike, 10-day strike by miners at Chuquicamata, Chile.
- 1996 prisoners' hunger strike in Turkey
- 1996 Sri Lankan electrical strike, 4-day strike by Ceylon Electricity Board electrical workers in Sri Lanka.

=== June ===
- 1996 Brazilian general strike
- 1996 McDonnell Douglas strike, 99-day strike by McDonnell Douglas machinists in the United States.

=== August ===
- 1996 Zimbabwe public sector strike

=== September ===
- 1996 Atlanta Symphony Orchestra strike, 10-week strike by Atlanta Symphony Orchestra musicians in the United States.
- 1996 Philadelphia Orchestra strike

=== October ===
- 1996 General Motors Canada strike
- 1996 Philippine Airlines strike

=== November ===
- 1996 Elf Aquitaine strike, 10-day strike by Elf Aquitaine oil workers in France.
- 1996 French Guiana student strike, in French Guiana.
- 1996 French truckers’ strike

=== December ===
- Christmas Massacre (Bolivia)
- 1996–1997 strikes in South Korea
- 1996–97 University of Ouagadougou strike, 3-month strike by students at the University of Ouagadougou, Burkina Faso.

== List of lockouts in 1996 ==
- 1996 NBA lockout

== Changes in legislation ==
- Workplace Relations Act 1996

== Statistics ==
According to the Austrian Trade Union Federation, there were no strikes in Austria in 1996, the second of the last three years without strikes.
