= Trade Union of Railwaymen and Transport Construction Workers of Ukraine =

The Trade Union of Railwaymen and Transport Construction Workers of Ukraine (TURU; Ukrainian: Професійна спілка залізничників і транспортних будівельників України) is national trade union federation bringing together unions representing workers in the railway industry in Ukraine.

The federation was established on 23 January 1992, and by the end of the century, it had about 760,000 members. As of 2015, it had 478,699 members. By 2019, its affiliates consisted of eight trade unions, of which, four were also affiliated to the Federation of Trade Unions of Ukraine.
