= National Confederation of the Trade-Union Organizations of Ukraine =

NKPU
- National Confederation of the Trade-Union Organizations of Ukraine
- Founded: November 26, 2004
- Location: Ukraine
- Members: 1.5 million (claimed)
- Key people: Petro Petrychenko, secretary general

The National Confederation of the Trade-Union Organizations of Ukraine (NKPU) is a national trade union center in Ukraine. It was founded November 26, 2004 and claims a membership of 1.5 million. The NKPU was formed as a breakaway union from the Federation of Trade Unions of Ukraine.

== See also ==
- Federation of Trade Unions of Ukraine
- Confederation of Free Trade Unions of Ukraine
