= 1996 Ukrainian and Russian miner strikes =

- Part of the 1990s Donbas miners' strikes
- Date: February 1, 1996
- Location: Ukraine and Russia
- Goals: $567 million in back pay for coal miners
- Methods: Strike actions

Lead figures
Ivan Mokhnachuk, deputy head of the Russian Union of Coal Industry Workers	Leonid Kuchma, Ukrainian president; Boris Yeltsin, Russian president

in 1996, coal miners across Ukraine and Russia went on strike in protest of wage theft and government neglect of national mines. About 1.5 million miners across the two countries participated in the strikes, demanding cumulatively $567 million in back pay. An additional 250,000 teachers walked out in solidarity with the striking miners.

The strike occurred during a push from the Ukrainian government to make liberal economic reforms and an ongoing presidential election in Russia, where a president who was once popular among miners was seeking re-election. The strike was expected to quickly exhaust reserve coal supplies in two nations that depended heavily, and in some cases primarily on coal extraction as source of energy in the winter.

== Background ==
The mining industry of Ukraine employed about 1.2 million workers at the time, including in the coal-rich Donbas region. Both Ukraine and Russia were heavily dependent on coal extraction during the winter season. In some regions, such as eastern Siberia, coal was the only available energy source for residents. While limited reserves of coal existed, they were only expected to last for about a week before being depleted without continued mining.

In February, there was an ongoing presidential campaign in Russia where president Boris Yeltsin was running for re-election. Yeltsin was previously popular among the miners who had helped bring him to power initially. Meanwhile, Ukrainian president Leonid Kuchma was working to implement liberal reforms in the country which were opposed by the Ukrainian parliament. In Ukraine, miners opposed cuts to government subsidies, and miners from both Ukraine and Russia were concerned about their governments' neglect of state-owned mines.

== Strike ==
On 1 February 1996, around 1,500,000 coal miners from the Donbass to eastern Siberia went on strike. Among the strikers were 1,000,000 Ukrainians and 500,000 Russians, representing half of all Russian miners and just over four fifths of all miners in Ukraine. About 250,000 Russian teachers decided to walk out in solidarity with the striking miners.

The strikers demanded hundreds of millions of dollars which they stated they lost due to wage theft. Ukrainian miners demanded $367 million in back pay, while Russian coal miners were demanding $200 million. Additionally, the workers were protesting Ukrainian subsidy cuts and government neglect of the state-owned mines the worked. While the two nations' miners were advancing their own demands, the strikes were a coordinated, international effort.

== See also ==
- 1989 Soviet miners' strikes
- 1990s Donbas miners' strikes
- 2020 Ukrainian miner protests
