= Trade Union of Education and Science Workers of Ukraine =

The Trade Union of Education and Science Workers of Ukraine (TUESWU; Ukrainian: Профспілка працівників освіти і науки України, PON) is a trade union representing workers in two related sectors in Ukraine.

The union was established on 14 September 1990, as the successor to the Ukrainian section of the Soviet Education, Higher Schools and Scientific Institutions Workers' Union. It affiliated to the Federation of Trade Unions of Ukraine. The union supported the Euromaidan protests, but lost significant membership with the annexation of Crimea by the Russian Federation and declarations of independence in the Luhansk and Donetsk regions. By early 2016, it had 1,678,674 members, making it the largest trade union in the country.

== Presidents ==
1990: Leonid Sachkov
2010:
2015: Georgiy Trukhanov
