= Nuclear Energy and Industry Workers' Union of Ukraine =

Ukrainian nuclear industry employee union

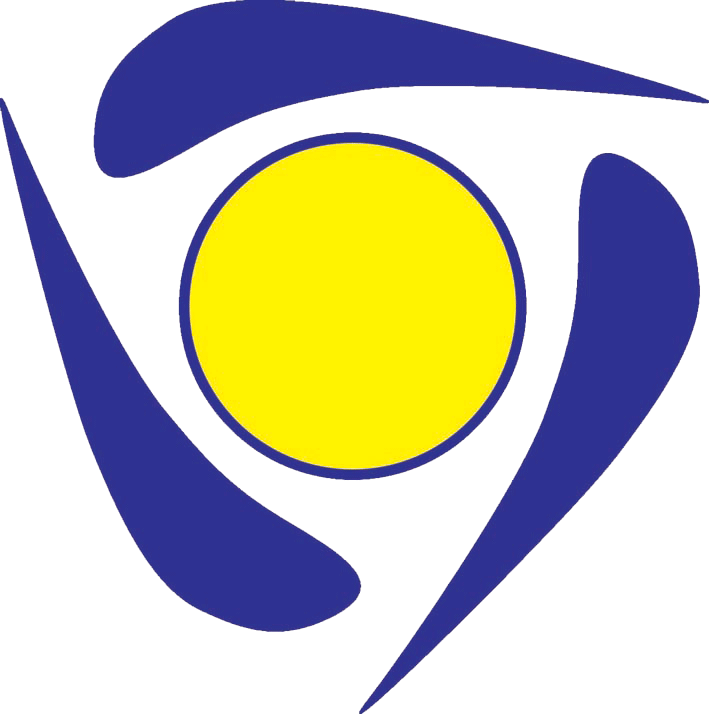
Union logo

The Nuclear Energy and Industry Workers' Union of Ukraine (Ukrainian: Профспілка працівників атомної енергетики та промисловості України, Atomprofspilka) is a trade union representing workers in the nuclear power industry in Ukraine.

The union was founded on 23 January 1992, with the merger of the Council of Trade Unions of Nuclear Power Plants, and the Pripyat NGO. Like both its predecessors, it affiliated to the Federation of Trade Unions of Ukraine. As of 2022, the union has about 56,000 members.
