= 1989 Soviet miners' strikes =

- Part of the dissolution of the Soviet Union
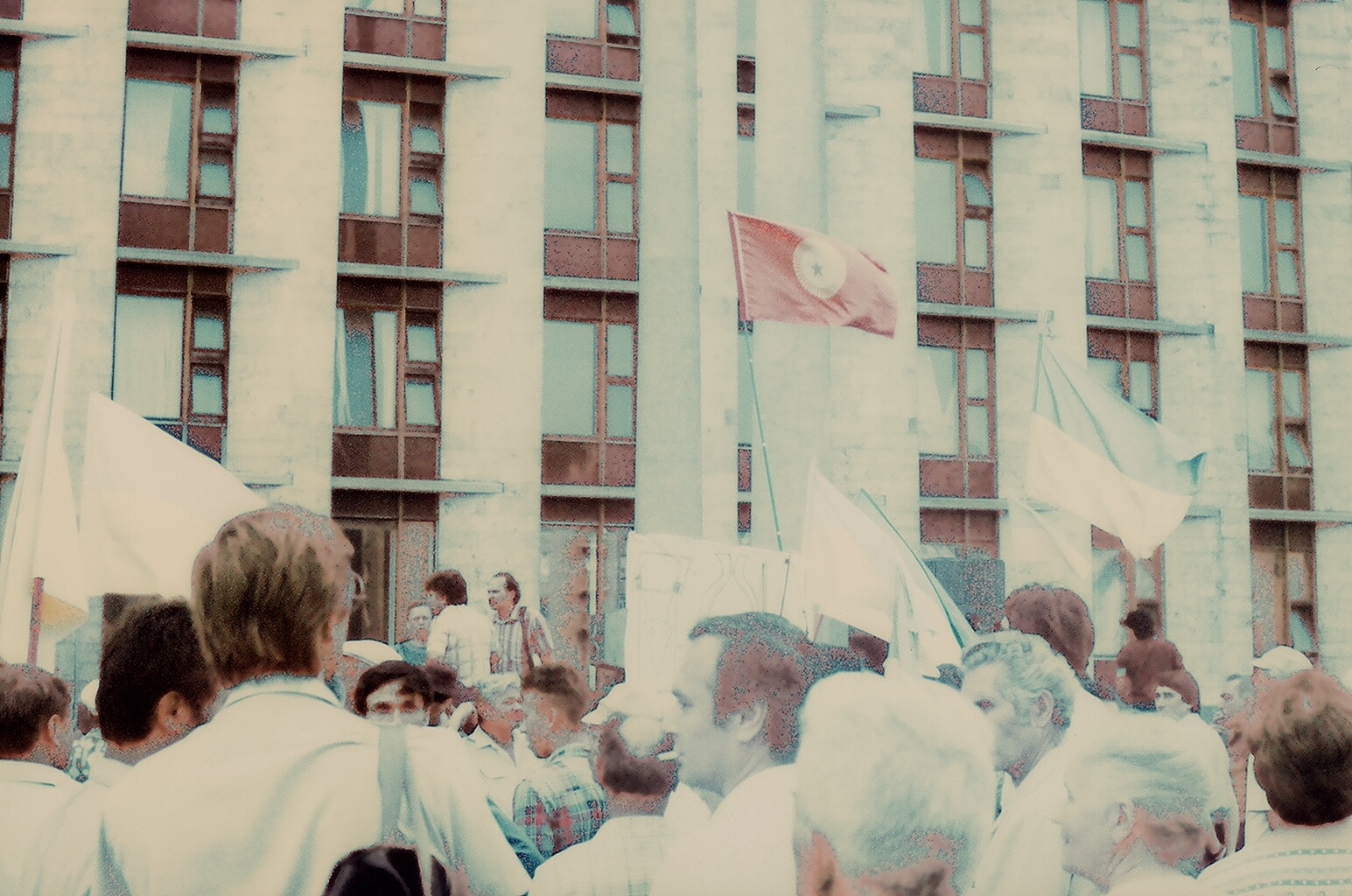
- Striking miners outside of the Donetsk Regional Committee of the Communist Party building, 1990
- Date: 10–27 July 1989; 1 March – May 1991
- Location: Soviet Union (Kuznetsk Basin, Donbas, Lviv-Volyn coal basin, Pechora coal basin, Karaganda coal basin)
- Caused by: Goods shortages; Lack of property rights; Poor working conditions; Cost of living; Pollution
- Goals: Wage increases; Workers' autonomy in management; Common day off for miners; Refocusing of central planning on production of necessities; Ukrainian independence (in the Donbas); End of nuclear testing (in the Karaganda basin); Resignation of Mikhail Gorbachev (1991); Dissolution of the Congress of People's Deputies (1991)
- Methods: Strike action

Parties
Coal miners	Government of the Soviet Union: Russian SFSR; Ukrainian SSR; Kazakh SSR

Lead figures
Decentralised leadership	Mikhail Gorbachev; Volodymyr Shcherbytsky; Gennady Kolbin; Nursultan Nazarbayev; Stepan Shalayev

Number
"Over 400,000"	

In July 1989, coal miners across the Soviet Union went on strike in protest of goods shortages, lack of property rights and poor working conditions. The largest strike in Soviet history, it was the first strike in the Soviet Union's history to be conducted legally. The miners' strike gathered support from Soviet dissidents and nationalist groups, and later snowballed into broader support for anti-communist causes, ultimately playing a significant part in the dissolution of the Soviet Union. The strikes play a significant role in both Russian and Ukrainian history; in Ukraine, the strikes are frequently described as the beginning of the 1989–1991 Ukrainian revolution, while among Russia's independent trade unionists 11 July is an informal holiday known as "miners' solidarity day."

While it is generally agreed that unsafe working conditions, low life expectancy, and general poor quality of living pushed Soviet coal miners to strike, there is disagreement on what caused coal miners to strike before other occupations. Strikes began in the Kuznetsk Basin of western Siberia on 10 or 11 July 1989, although sporadic strikes had previously taken place across the Soviet Union from February to April of that year. The Kuznetsk Basin subsequently spread to the Donbas region of the Ukrainian Soviet Socialist Republic; strikes in both regions subsequently adopted political demands alongside their original economic ones, though the reasons for such were separate in both cases. The strikes continued to spread throughout the Soviet Union in July before coming to an end late in the month. Ukrainian strikes continued, and radicalised into demands for Ukrainian sovereignty from the Soviet Union; Volodymyr Shcherbytsky, the hardline and anti-strike leader of Ukraine's communist party, was removed in September. Strikes continued to heat up in the next month, and later broke out in March and April 1991 with support from Russian anti-communist leader Boris Yeltsin. The strikes ended in May of that year after ownership of the mines was transferred from the Soviet central government to the republics of the Soviet Union.

== Background ==
The mining industry of the Soviet Union had suffered from unsafe working conditions throughout its entire existence. Particularly from the rule of Joseph Stalin, increased productivity was encouraged by the Soviet state at the cost of workers' well-being under the Stakhanovite movement. The Stakhanovite movement had occasionally been revived after Stalin's 1953 death, particularly after Mikhail Gorbachev became General Secretary of the Communist Party of the Soviet Union in 1986. The Twelfth Five-Year Plan had failed to deliver the promised level of industrial production in the coal industry, leading to additional pressure on regional leaders such as Ukraine's Volodymyr Shcherbytsky to increase production by any means. A 1987 decree encouraged miners to work evenings and nights, for which they were not paid.

In 1990, the life expectancy for a Soviet coal miner was under 50 years. They lacked a common day off from c. 1980, when the Soviet coal mining union had allowed the government to abolish it without prior input from coal miners. Industrial pollution was rampant in coal-mining regions; in certain parts of the Kuznetsk Basin of Siberia, life expectancy was ten years below the national average as a result of open-pit mining and scarce water resources and arable land. The failures of the Soviet economy during the 1980s also served to increase miners' discontent. Wages in Ukraine's Donbas region, for instance, were stagnant, and there were shortages of basic necessities like soap. The success of Gorbachev's perestroika campaign had made long-thriving local corruption intolerable, and greater knowledge of the West drove citizens to view the Soviet bureaucracy as dishonest and ineffective.

Several theories have been advanced as to the reasons why miners, in contrast to other industries, went on strike. Clark Kerr and Abraham Siegel's 1964 "isolated community thesis", suggesting that miners were more likely to strike because of the relative isolation in which they lived, in contrast to the established inter-occupational relations in multi-industry towns, has traditionally been the most-accepted answer. Academic Stephen Crowley refuted the application of the isolated community thesis to Soviet miners in 1994, arguing that Ted Robert Gurr's relative deprivation theory and Charles Tilly's resource mobilisation theory were more apt. Crowley cites the overall decrease in miners' conditions during the Soviet economic crisis and the fact that coal miners had built up skills (namely a sense of unity amongst one another) that enabled them to better lead strikes.

Brookings Institution research associate Clifford Gaddy suggested in 1991 that the miners' strikes had instead emerged as a result of inflation and shortages resulting in a decline in the phenomenon of illegally providing scarce goods or granting workers the right to steal from their workplace as a reward for work. This practice had peaked in the 1970s at around 50% of official wages, which were offset by constant workplace absenteeism. Gaddy argues that while other occupations would simply continue to steal from their jobs in order to survive inflationary pressures, coal miners had no such luxury, as most necessary goods could not be found in coal mines. In justifying his point, Gaddy notes that coal miners were among the best-paid in the Soviet Union, and that other theories would have driven other industries to join the miners in their strike.

The role of national issues in the strikes has been disputed, particularly in the Donbas. In a May 1991 interview, Donbas strike leaders Mykhail Krylov and Yuri Makarov expressed the belief that an independent Ukrainian state would ensure Ukraine's economic self-governance and viewed it as positive. Krylov later claimed in a 2009 interview that "We never pursued the goal of Soviet collapse. We were against the people in power, rather than the country," but chairman of the Independent Miners' Union of the Donbas Mykola Volynko said in 2015 that sentiments opposed to Ukrainian independence only arose during the 2014 pro-Russian unrest in Ukraine. Volynko noted that miners from the city of Pervomaisk, Luhansk Oblast helped to erect the flag of Ukraine at the Kyiv City Council building in 1990.

== Early strikes ==
Precursors to the commonly defined beginning of the strikes occurred throughout the early months of 1989. According to a 2019 post by Sergeyev on the website of the Independent Union of Miners, the first such spontaneous strike happened in Osinniki, Kemerovo Oblast in February. This was followed by another strike in the city of Vorkuta, in the northern Pechora coal basin, on 2 March. Workers at the Severnaya mine left their shifts and launched a hunger strike, which lasted three days. After the Vorkuta strike came strikes in Novokuznetsk on 1 April, in Rostov and Kemerovo Oblasts on 3 April, in Norilsk from 4 to 8 April, in Sverdlovsk Oblast from 5 to 9 April, and in Kiselyovsk, Kemerovo Oblast on 28 April.

== July strikes ==
On 10 or 11 July 1989, coal miners in the city of Mezhdurechensk, Kemerovo Oblast (in the Kuznetsk Basin) went on strike. David E. Hoffman wrote for The Washington Post in 1998 that the miners had "found there was no soap to wash up after work," and promptly launched a strike. Their demands were primarily economic, including greater supply for consumer goods and increased autonomy in self-management, and found sympathy both within the Soviet Union and abroad, where they were compared to the Polish trade union Solidarity. The lack of soap has often been cited as the source for the strikes, but Aleksandr Sergeyev, a member of the Mezhdurechensk Strike Committee, said in 2019 that it was a "pebble that pushed the avalanche of protest." 11 July has been celebrated by Russia's independent trade unionists as "miners' solidarity day", marking the anniversary of the strikes, since 1990.

The strikes soon spread throughout the Kuznetsk Basin and the Soviet Union. On 17 July, miners in Ukraine's eastern Donbas joined the strikes as 2,000 miners from the city of Makiivka walked out of work. They were joined by workers in the smaller Lviv-Volyn coal basin in western Ukraine. The strikes in the Kuznetsk Basin later spread to fifteen different towns, paralysing coal production. The strikes soon took on political demands, as miners demanded to speak to Soviet Premier Nikolai Ryzhkov. They were regarded warmly by the usually-conservative daily newspaper Sovetskaya Rossiya, which described the strikes as "lending [perestroika] a hand from below." In Ukraine, by contrast, Shcherbytsky treated the miners as a threat. Krylov claimed that the government cut off the strike committees' lines of communication to prevent them from organising with other industries, and disparaged them in the press. This opposition motivated the miners of the Donbas to take on political demands, namely calling for Shcherbytsky and Valentyna Shevchenko, Chairwoman of the Supreme Soviet of the Ukrainian SSR, to be removed from office.

On the same day that strikes had begun in Makiivka, a meeting of the Vorkuta urban executive committee was convened. At the meeting, it was agreed to adopt a resolution urging Soviet political leadership to accept the workers' demands, as well as to launch a "preventive" strike under the local government's auspices. The local government feared that strikes in the region would be radicalised, and, according to the First Secretary of the urban executive committee, "the urban committee set for itself the task: everything must be organised and there must be order everywhere." That night, however, workers at the Khalmer-Yu mine outside the city began a strike. They published a list of four demands on 25 July, which the mine's management refused to agree to. Safar Allakhverdiyev, a member of the management, visited deputy Minister for the Coal Industry Grigory Nuzhdikhin, seeking a solution to the strikes, but he received no reply. By the time of his return, the list of demands had increased to 70. Much like in Ukraine, authorities in Vorkuta attempted to halt information on the strikes from spreading. However, after a worker at another mine learned about the strike, they soon spread throughout the city's coal mines.

On 20 July 1989, a Soviet government commission arrived in the city of Donetsk, as strikes began spreading throughout Ukraine's mining centres and two days after strikes had begun in the Kazakh Soviet Socialist Republic's Karaganda coal basin. Two days later, Gorbachev and Ryzhkov announced their agreement with the demands and pleaded with the miners to return to work. While this satisfied miners in the Kuznetsk Basin, who returned to work on 22–23 July, workers throughout the rest of the Union (particularly in Ukraine and Vorkuta) demanded that acceptance of their demands be bound by law. Members of the Congress of People's Deputies of the Soviet Union from the Donbas met with Ryzhkov in Moscow, as Vorkuta's deputy V. Luzhnikov drafted a law to codify the miners' demands into law. By 27 July, the strikes had come to an end.

== Later strike threats and small-scale strikes ==
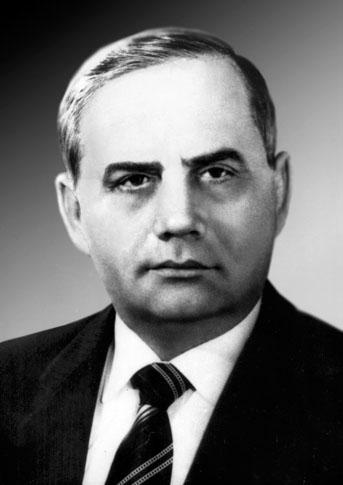
Vladimir Ivashko (pictured) replaced Volodymyr Shcherbytsky as First Secretary of the Communist Party of Ukraine in response to the strikes

After the strikes came to an end, there were continued threats to renew strikes over the Soviet government's failure to implement demands. These threatened strikes were especially frequent in Ukraine, where miners were increasingly militant in their activism. None of these strikes, however, went through; a threatened strike in September over holidays and pensions fell through after First Deputy Premier Lev Voronin claimed that the Soviet government was developing plans for increasing workers' autonomy. Threats to call another strike were also voiced by 38 deputies from Ukraine's opposition in August in response to changes in the organisation of the Congress of People's Deputies.

Meanwhile, the Communist Party of Ukraine was thrown into crisis by the strikes. On 7 August the party's Central Committee met to discuss the strikes; at the meeting, the party engaged in wide-reaching self-criticism and criticism of the Soviet government, condemning minister for the coal industry Mikhail Shchadov for ignoring miners' needs and local leaders for allowing food, housing and financial insecurity among miners to escalate. A month later, Shcherbytsky was removed as First Secretary of the party and replaced with Vladimir Ivashko, a mining engineer who was seen by the public as a protégé of Gorbachev.

This, however, did not stem efforts to renew strikes in the Donbas; on 1 and 12 October, miners threatened to launch continued strikes. They requested that their demands be passed immediately, something Gorbachev argued was impossible due to the situation being "complicated." After a strike leader, Aleksandr Sotnikov, was murdered in the city of Zverevo while investigating corruption in the coal industry, the Soviet government once again pled with miners not to strike, and a 31 October resolution among Ukrainian miners' unions to launch a strike was voted down. In spite of this, some enterprises went on strike for hours, or in one case a full day.

The labour movement continued to grow throughout 1990, with the Independent Union of Miners being founded in July 1990. The IUM attempted to launch a strike on 11 July 1990 to demand the fall of Ryzhkov's government, but the strike's purely-political nature drove away workers, resulting in a loss of momentum. As unions among other occupations began to form based on the example of the IUM, the union reverted to its economically-focused nature in late 1990 and 1991.

== March–April 1991 strikes ==
On 1 March 1991, roughly 70,000 miners, comprising the workforce of 23 out of 26 mines in the Karaganda basin, walked off their jobs with demands for Gorbachev's resignation, the dissolution of the Congress of People's Deputies, wage increases and compensation for increased prices. The same day, Ukrainian coal miners launched a strike also demanding Gorbachev's resignation and the dissolution of the Congress of People's Deputies, as well as recognition of the Declaration of State Sovereignty of Ukraine. Miners in Karaganda originally planned to strike for a single day, but after their demands were not met, their leadership stated that the strike would be extended to four days. They were soon joined by miners in the Kuznetsk Basin.

As price increases continued, the coal miners were joined by workers in Belarus, who also demanded Gorbachev's resignation along with the leader of Byelorussian Soviet Socialist Republic leader Vyacheslav Kebich. The 1991 strikes were much more political in nature than their 1989 predecessors, openly calling for Gorbachev's resignation and the dissolution of existing political organs. They also had significantly improved their organisation, with several formal organisations working to ensure maintenance of the strikes.

At the time, Gorbachev contemplated using "all measures at his disposal," as adviser Georgy Shakhnazarov told press. Shakhnazarov also stated that placing a moratorium on all strikes would be "no danger to democracy." The standoff continued until May 1991, when agreements were established between the miners and the governments of the republics of the Soviet Union transferring ownership of the mines and their equipment from the central government to the republics.

== Dissident support ==
Soviet dissidents, particularly in Ukraine, quickly recognised the importance of the strikes and threw their weight behind them. Viacheslav Chornovil, de facto leader of Ukraine's dissident movement and chairman of the Ukrainian Helsinki Group, spoke to Radio Liberty on 21 July describing the strikes as "a new stage of perestroika" which was "tearing down the veil of party demagoguery regarding the unity of the party and the people" both in Russia and Ukraine. Canadian historian David R. Marples has claimed that the Ukrainian Helsinki Union and People's Movement of Ukraine utilised the strikes to advance public support for their policies, but Ukrainian historian Taras Kuzio disputed this, saying that the miners were originally distrustful of dissidents as they were of outsiders and figures of authority in general. According to Kuzio, the miners only united with the intellectuals late in 1989, after the formation of the People's Movement of Ukraine.

Sergeyev has stated that the Russian anti-communist intelligentsia provided no support to the miners in 1989. He has claimed that support only came during the 1991 presidential campaign of Boris Yeltsin, and beforehand intellectuals had either been uninterested in responding to the strike or had outright supported the authorities. American researcher Lewis Siegelbaum has partially corroborated Sergeyev's recollections, saying that miners "worked closely, if surreptitiously, with the so-called 'democrats' ranged around Gorbachev's rival, Boris Eltsin [sic]" before supporting him in the 1991 Russian presidential election. During the 1991 strikes in Belarus, the opposition Belarusian Popular Front supported striking workers, with dissident writers Vasil Bykaŭ and Ales Adamovich giving public backing to the strikes. Zviad Gamsakhurdia, a Georgian dissident leader, also called on Georgian dockers, railway workers, and other employees of state-owned enterprises to strike in April 1991.

== Impact ==
The 1989 miners' strikes were the first large-scale independent strike actions to be conducted in the Soviet Union. The size of the strike, and its hitherto unprecedented nature, was cast by researcher Leonid Gordon as giving the necessary impetus to Gorbachev to implement the 500 Days Program. Gaddy wrote that the strikes had inflicted "billions of rubles in lost output" upon the Soviet economy, a claim repeated by the Soviet government in April 1991. Coal output decreased by 5% from 1989 to 1990 and by 18% from 1990 to 1991.

In Ukraine, the miners' strikes are traditionally described as the beginning of the 1989–1991 Ukrainian revolution, which led to Ukraine's independence from the Soviet Union. In both countries, however, miners were ultimately let down by post-Soviet shock therapy and stark socio-economic inequality which manifested itself in the face of the dissolution of the Soviet Union.

== See also ==
- 1990s Donbas miners' strikes
- 1984–1985 United Kingdom miners' strike
- 1989 Kosovo miners' strike
