= Housing, Utility, and Domestic Services and Local Industry Workers' Union =

Ukrainian trade union

- Профспілка працівників житлово-комунального господарства, місцевої промисловості, побутового обслуговування населення України
- Abbreviation: Zhkgprof
- Established: September 1990; 36 years ago
- Type: Trade union
- Location: Ukraine
- Fields: Service industries
- Members: 197,200 (2018)
- Official language: Ukrainian
- Affiliations: Federation of Trade Unions of Ukraine (FPU)
- Website: www.zhkgprof.com.ua

The Housing, Utility, and Domestic Services and Local Industry Workers' Union (Ukrainian: Профспілка працівників житлово-комунального господарства, місцевої промисловості, побутового обслуговування населення України, Zhkgprof) is a trade union representing service industry workers in Ukraine.

The union held its founding congress in September 1990, at which time, it had around 1,600,000 members. It affiliated to the new Federation of Trade Unions of Ukraine. At the time, its members worked in the public sector, but a process of commercialisation followed by privatisation moved most of its workforce to the private sector, and saw its membership fall. By 2018, it had 197,200 members.
