= Trade Unions Building (Kyiv) =

Office building in Kyiv, Ukraine

Coordinates: 50.4508°N 30.5245°E

Union House of Ukrainian Trade Unions Federation
- Будинок спілок Федерації професійних спілок України
- The Trade Unions Building in September 2024.
- Interactive map of the Union House of Ukrainian Trade Unions Federation area

General information
- Status: Completely reconstructed
- Location: Maidan Nezalezhnosti, 16 Khreshchatyk Street, Kyiv, Ukraine
- Completed: 1982
- Inaugurated: 27 June 1982

Design and construction
- Architects: Oleksandr Malynovsky and Oleksandr Komarovsky
- Main contractor: Kyivmiskbud-4

The Trade Unions Building, or Budynok Profspilok (officially in Ukrainian: Будинок спілок Федерації професійних спілок України, romanized: Budynok spilok Federatsii profesiinykh spilok Ukrainy, Union house of the Federation of Trade Unions of Ukraine), is a large office building in Kyiv, Ukraine. Located on the city's main Khreshchatyk Street, its façade faces the central Maidan Nezalezhnosti square and contains the city's main clock tower.

The building was built in place of the Noble Assembly building that stood in its place during 1851–1980 and even survived World War II.

It was burned down on February 18, 2014, during the Revolution of Dignity. Restoration of the building was completed on May 30, 2018.

== History ==
Maidan Nezalezhnosti's northern half is a unique layout that's topped with a semi-circle with six radial roads. After the destruction of several Khrestchatyk buildings (such as Kyiv City Duma building, Ginzburg building and others) by the Soviet diversion groups during World War II on 24 September 1941, the square was completely rebuilt in the mid-1950s in a project presided over by architect Alexander Dobrovolsky, in a style to resemble the dominant revival architecture trend, known as socialist classicism.

In 1956, Moscow issued a decree that challenged the use of excessive decorations in architecture, which stopped existing work before the project could be finished leaving the square with obvious asymmetry, with only the western part completed.

After nearly two decades of such visual dissemblance, in 1974 the XXVth Kyiv's city conference gave a go-ahead to re-develop the city centre and finish the ensemble. The Ukrainian Republican Soviet of Trade Unions (predecessor to the current Federation of Trade Unions of Ukraine) was awarded this prize spot in a draw, and was to sponsor the construction that was carried out by the Kyivmiskbud-4 trust.

The building's project, work of Kyivan-native architects Oleksandr Malynovsky and Oleksandr Komarovsky, was a very fine crafted design. This was because it had to match the imposing Kyiv Post Office building opposite not only in proportions, but in such a style that would blend in with the milieu, yet be visibly a modern structure. One feature that punctuated the latter, was a 24-metre tower with four 7.2 x 4.3 metre screens displaying the current time, temperature, date and other information. This became the official clock tower of Ukraine, and chimed the famous melody Yak tebe ne lyubyty, Kyyeve miy. In 2011 the tower was renovated and the screens, being a matrix of almost five thousand 127-Volt, 40 W light bulbs were replaced by diode matrices, providing multi-colour digital image with much greater resolution.

Most of the building is used as offices by the Trade Unions federation, however it contains several auditoriums and banquet rooms that allowed it to be used as a permanent multi-purpose venue.

=== Euromaidan ===
During the late 2013 to early 2014 Euromaidan protest campaigns, the building was occupied by protesters and turned into their main center housing political headquarters, the press center, security center and the main kitchen. A number of important Euromaidan events, including recurrent attacks and provocations by police, occurred in and around the building.

The building was completely burnt down during the night of 18–19 February, the day before the mass sniping fire took place during the 2014 Ukrainian Revolution.

Due to the severe damages the building suffered from the fire, it was covered with large canvas screens on two sides with the words "Glory to Ukraine" printed on them in large letters. The building is since then rebuilt and will include a museum dedicated to the Euromaidan events. The reopening was scheduled to be before 1 March 2018, but the opening was postponed. On 21 November 2018 a new KFC restaurant opened in the renovated Trade Unions House.

=== Later events ===
In April 2025, the building was seized by the government and transferred to a trust (Управляюча компанія "КАМпарітет"), with the building belonging to the Federation of Trade Unions of Ukraine earlier.

== Gallery ==
Trade Unions' Building and Independence Square, September 1991, just weeks after the August Coup and before Ukrainian independence. Note the hammer and sickle emblem on the building.

Trade Unions Building, July 2013.

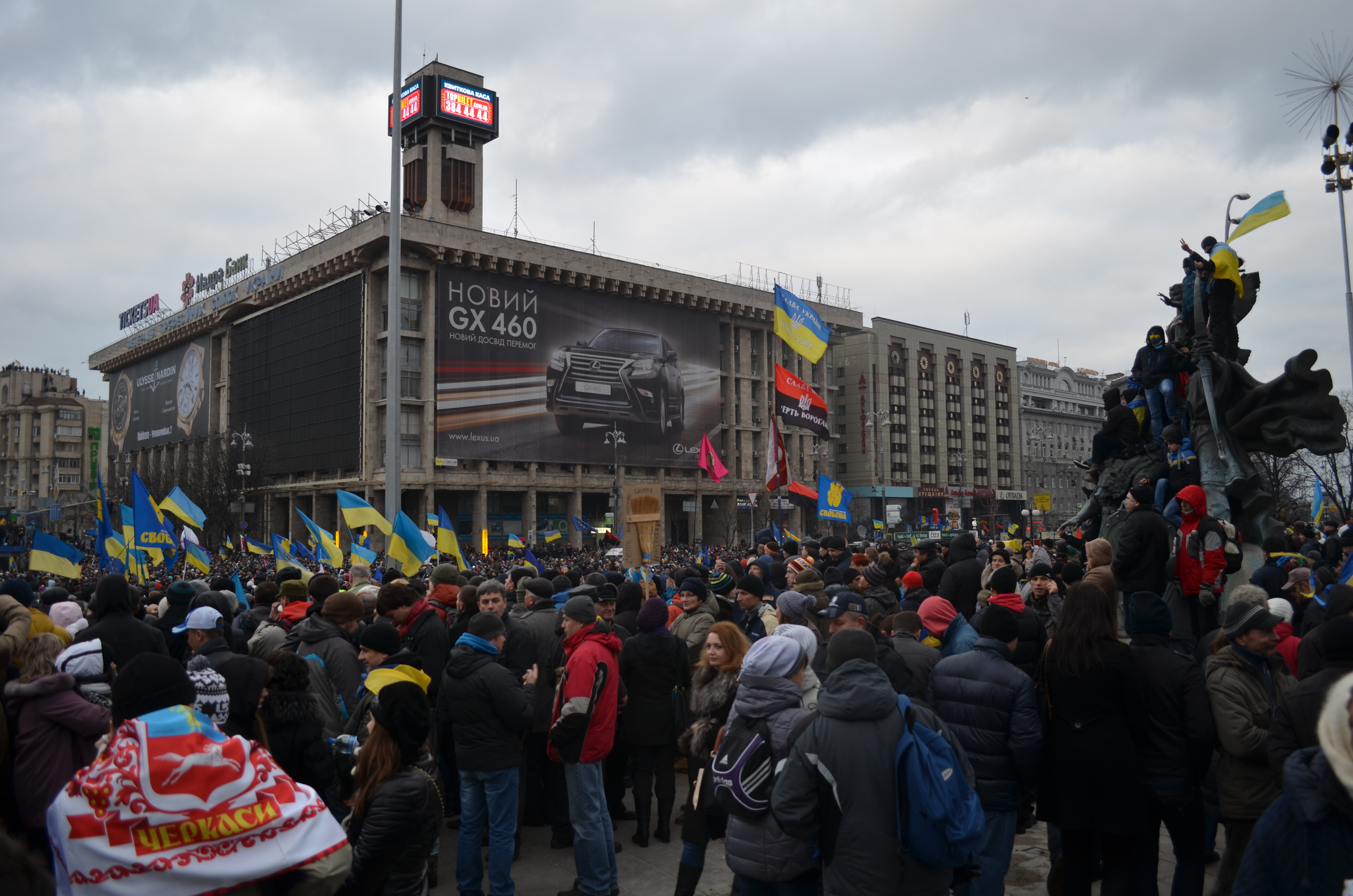
Trade Union Building surrounded by Euromaidan protesters, 1 December 2013.

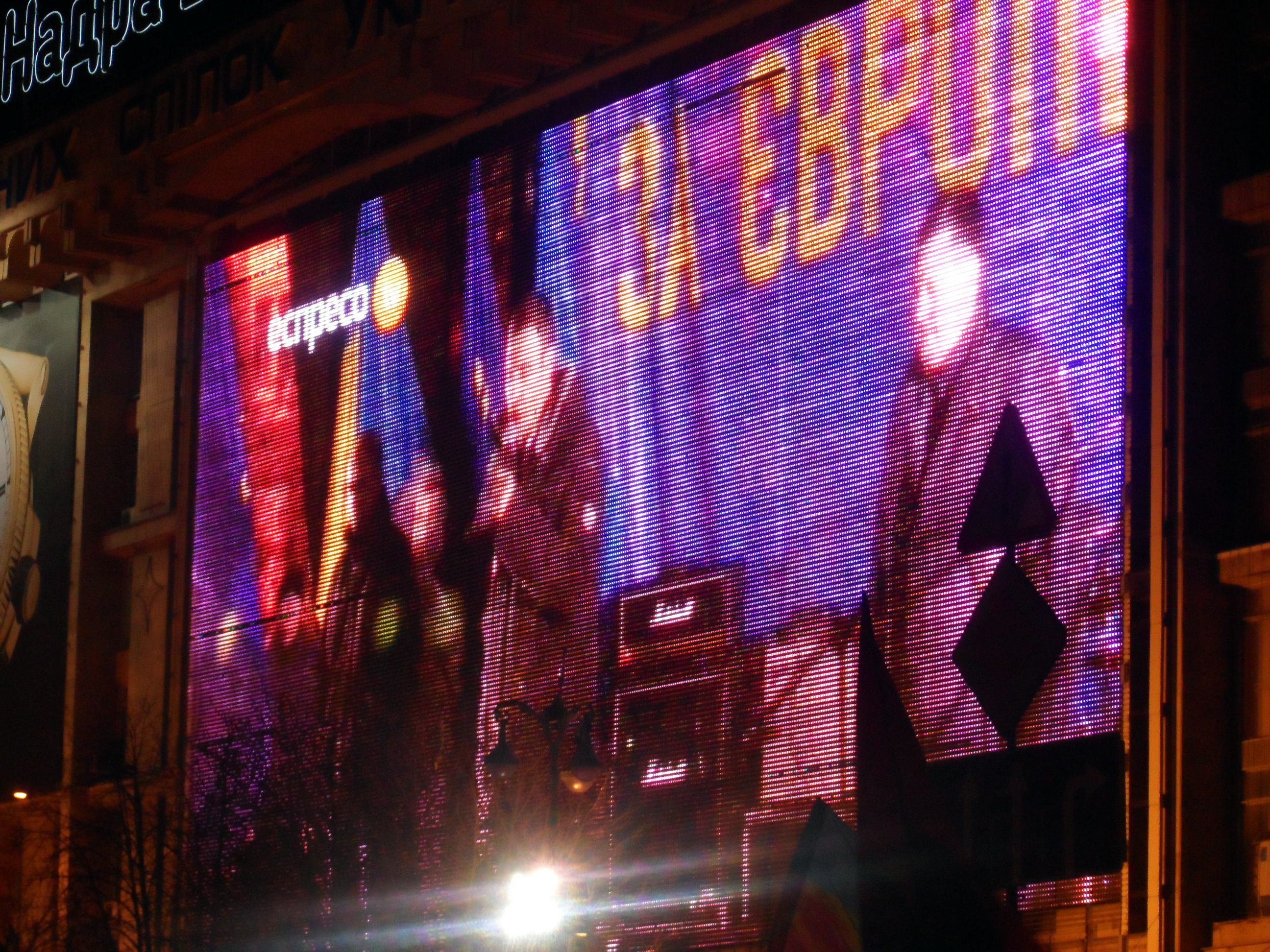
Giant advertising screen on the façade of Trade Unions Building broadcasts Vitali Klitschko addressing the crowds at the Maidan Nezalezhnosti, 3 December 2013.

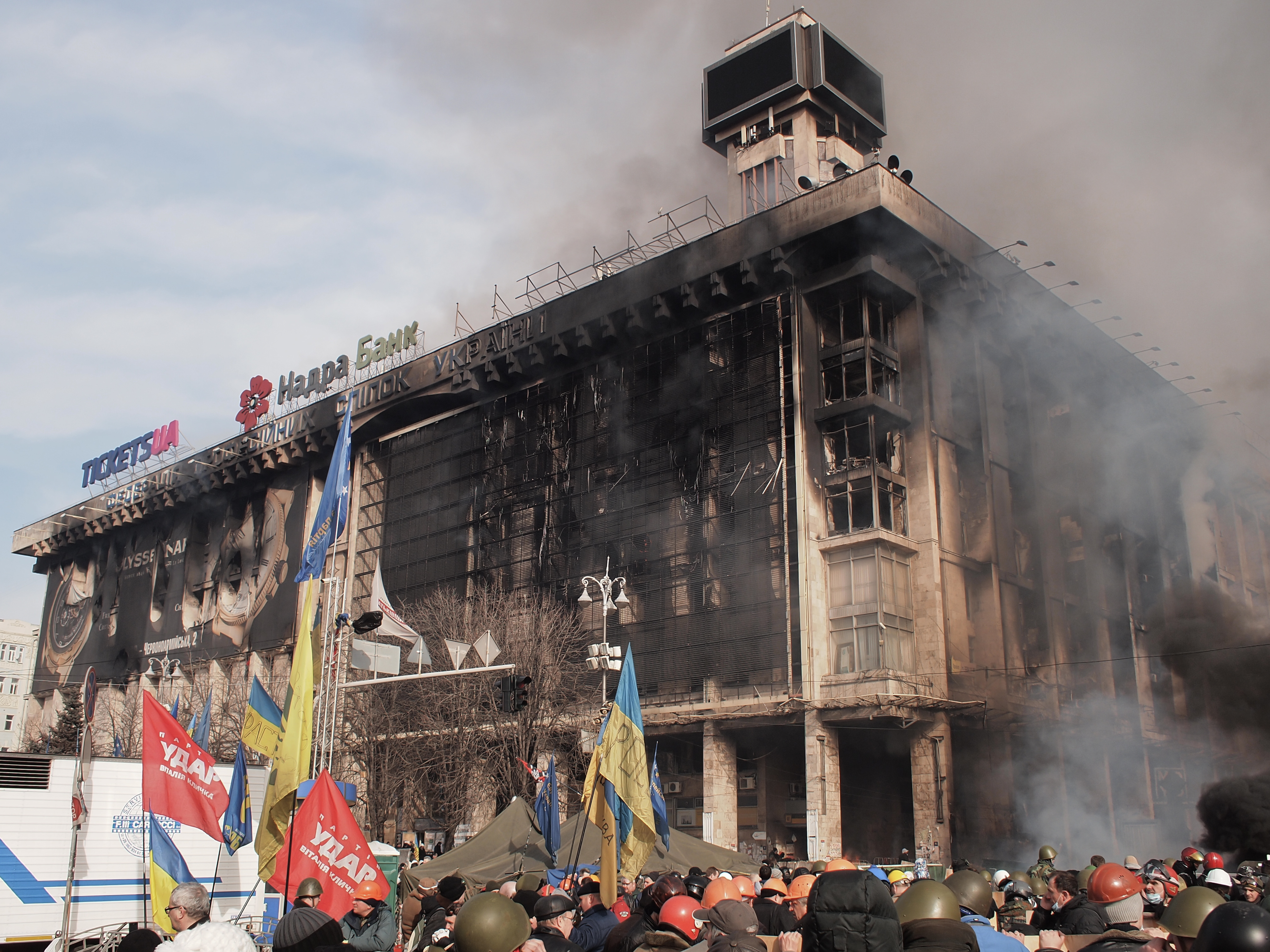
The building was set afire, reportedly by policemen, on 18 February 2014, during Euromaidan clashes.

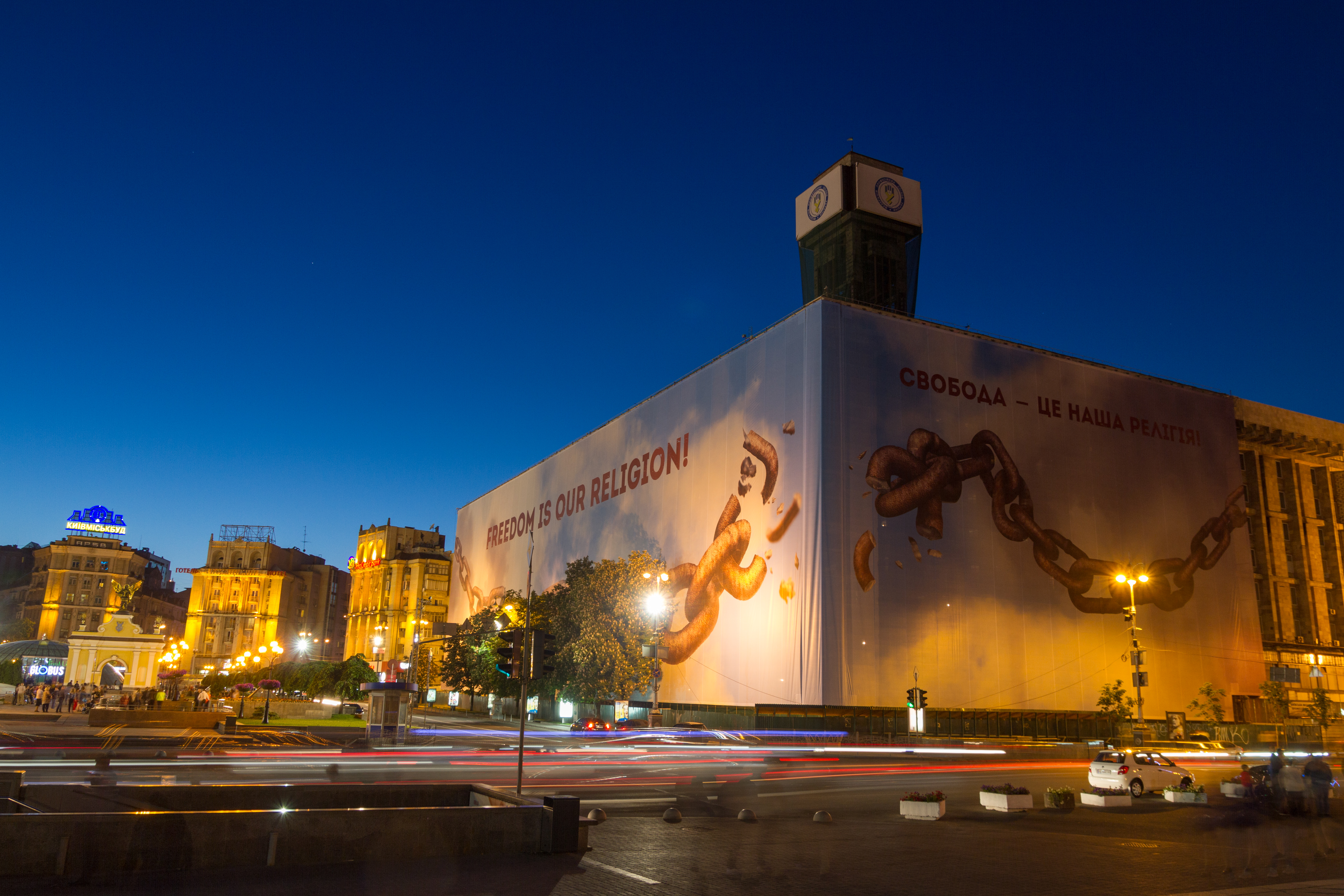
Banner with the inscription "Freedom is our religion" in 2017, prior to restoration.

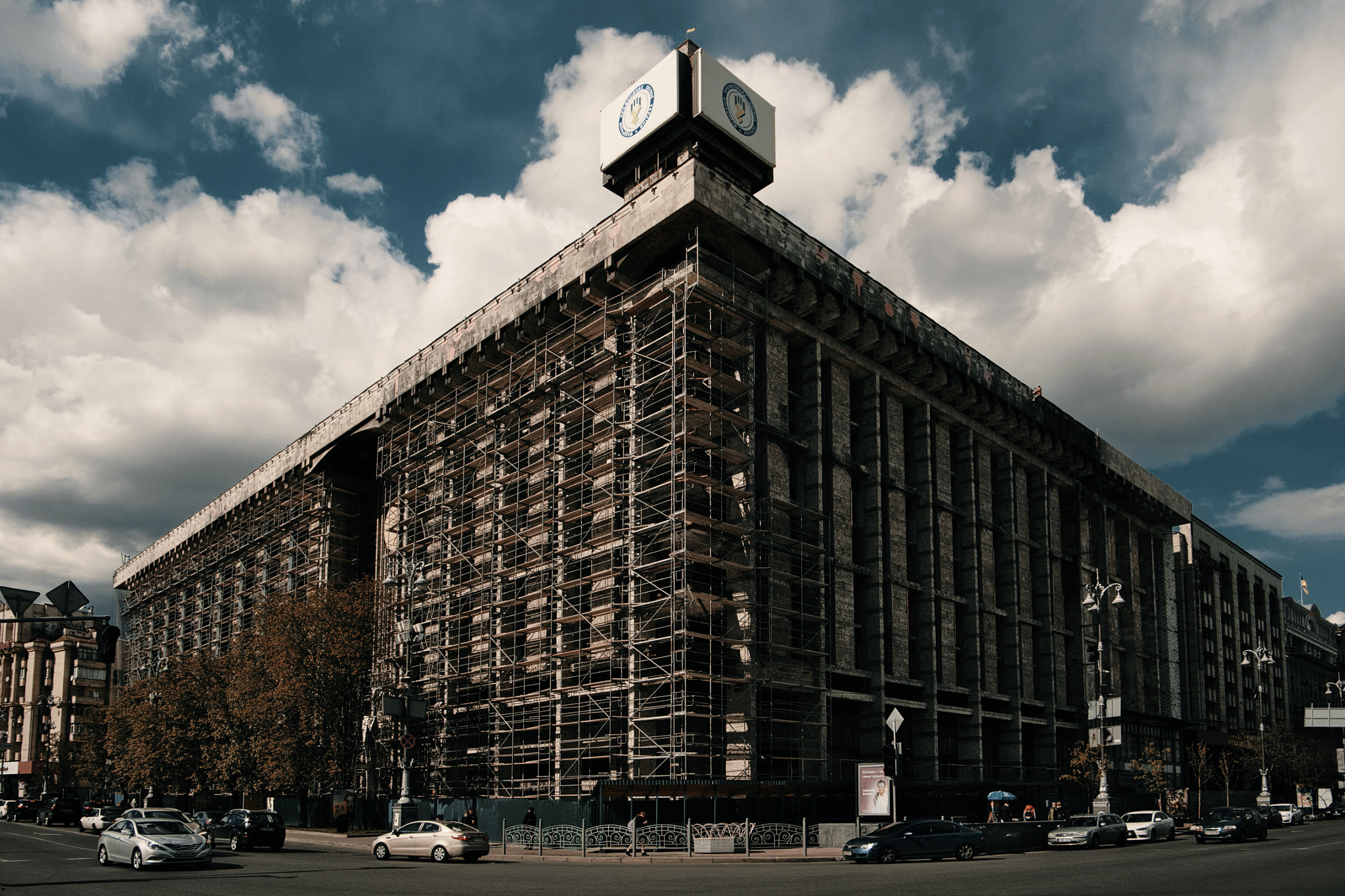
Reconstruction after the fire, 2017

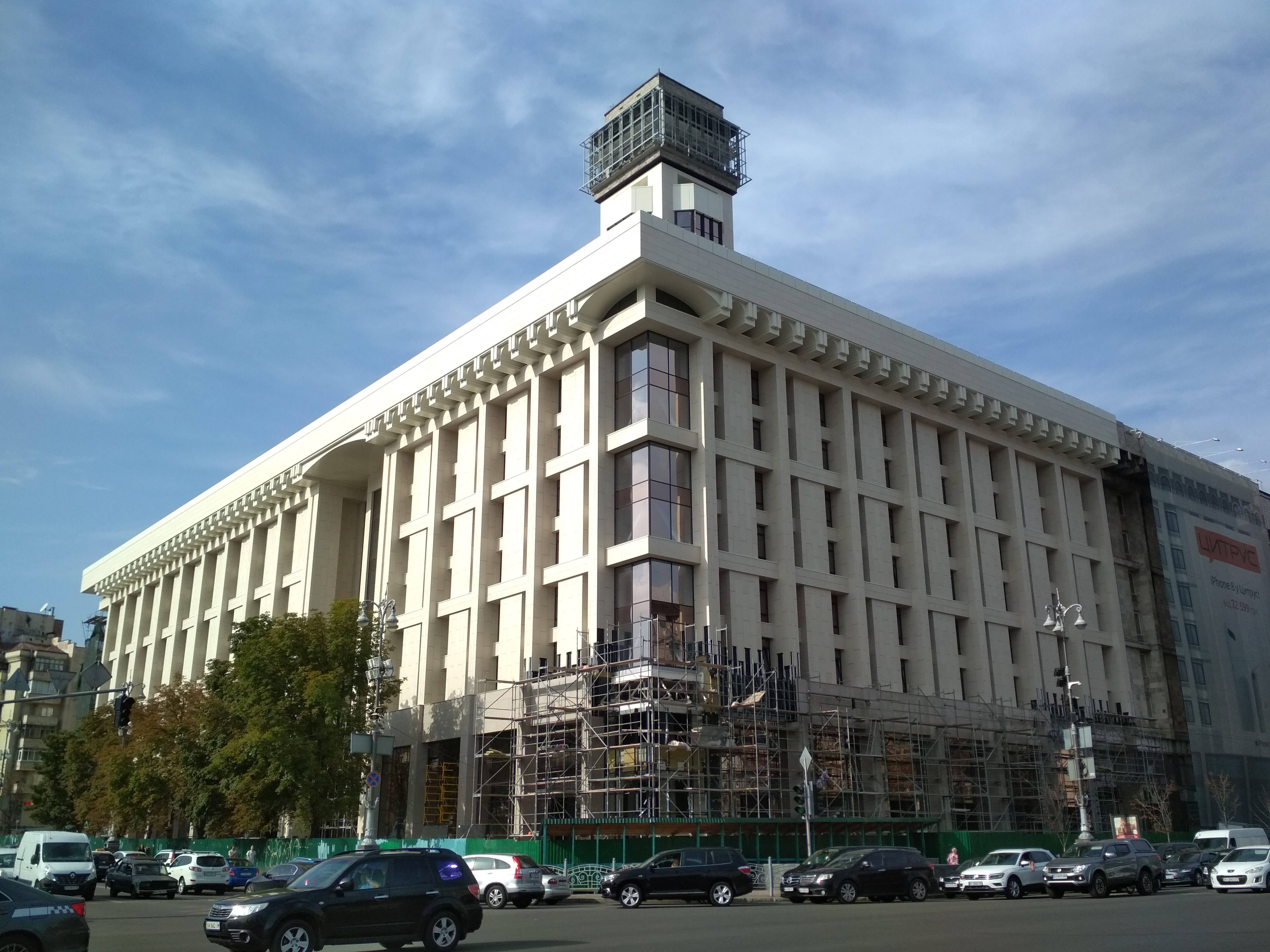
Reconstruction after the fire, 2018
