= Oil and Gas Industry Workers' Union =

Ukrainian oil and gas trade union

The Oil and Gas Industry Workers' Union (Ukrainian: Професійна спілка працівників нафтової і газової промисловості України, Ukrnaftogazprofspilka) is a trade union representing workers in the oil and gas industry in Ukraine.

The union was established on 21 June 1977, as the Ukrainian Committee of the Trade Union of Oil and Gas Workers. In 1990, it became independent and affiliated to the Federation of Trade Unions of Ukraine. As of 2017, the union had more than 100,000 members, but by the start of 2021, its membership had fallen to 74,839.

== Presidents ==
1977: Vasyl Kitsun
1983: Vasyl Hradiuk
1990: Alexander Popel
2009: Volodymyr Dmytryshyn
