= State Employees' Union of Ukraine =

The State Employees' Union of Ukraine (Ukrainian: Профспілка працівників державних установ України, SEUU) is a trade union representing workers in the public sector in Ukraine.

The union was established in 1990. It affiliated to the Federation of Trade Unions of Ukraine (FPU). By 2019, it was the fifth-largest affiliate of the FPU, with 200,000 members.
