= Agricultural Industry Workers' Union =

Ukrainian trade union

- Профспілка працівників агропромислового комплексу України
- Abbreviation: Profapk
- Predecessor: Ukrainian Republican Committee of the Trade Union of Agricultural Workers
- Established: May 25, 1990; 36 years ago
- Type: Trade union
- Location: Ukraine
- Fields: Agriculture & food processing
- Members: 400,00 (2010)
- Official language: Ukrainian
- Affiliations: Federation of Trade Unions of Ukraine (FPU)
- Website: profapk.org.ua

The Agricultural Industry Workers' Union (Ukrainian: Профспілка працівників агропромислового комплексу України, Profapk) is a trade union representing agricultural and food processing workers in Ukraine.

The union was established on 25 May 1990, as the successor to the Ukrainian Republican Committee of the Trade Union of Agricultural Workers. It affiliated to the Federation of Trade Unions of Ukraine (FPU), and initially had about 2,000,000 members. In its early years, it formed a social partnership with the All-Ukrainian Council of Collective Farms.

Due to large-scale job losses in the industry, in addition to the general decline in trade union membership in the country, and the loss of members in Crimea, Donetsk and Luhansk, by 2019, the union's membership was down to 400,000, although it remained the third-largest affiliate of the FPU.

== Chairs ==
1990: Nagorny Kim Mykolayovych
1993: Volodymyr Kuzmovich Chepur
2011: Sopelkin Igor Sergeevich
