= 2020 Ukrainian miners' strikes =

Series of strike actions organised by miners in Ukraine

- Date: 30 June – 15 October 2020 (3 months, 2 weeks and 1 day)
- Location: Ukraine
- Caused by: Poor working conditions; Non-payment of wages; Privatisation of mines; Export of coal to Russia during the Russo-Ukrainian war
- Goals: Payment of wages; Increased wages and pensions; Improved working conditions; End of coal exports to Russia
- Methods: Strike action, sit-in, demonstration, marching

Parties
Independent Trade Union of Ukrainian Miners	Government of Ukraine; Kryvyi Rih Iron Ore Combine (Metinvest, Privat Group); Energoatom

Lead figures
Mykhailo Volynets	Volodymyr Zelenskyy; Rinat Akhmetov; Ihor Kolomoyskyi

During the summer and autumn of 2020, miners across Ukraine launched spontaneous and sporadic nationwide rallies and strike actions, protesting deteriorating conditions and demanding pension preferences, better working conditions and wage increases.

The miner strikes would be the biggest in Ukraine since 1996, when a massive strike movement hit the nation. Coal miners, steel workers protested for 11 days in July 2020 in western and eastern Ukraine, demanding the end of coal exports to Russia and increased wages. After 11 days of peaceful marches, miners won the protests and coal operations restarted, one of their main demands.

A spontaneous strike movement took place in the autumn of 2020, when miners waved the Ukrainian flag and demonstrated difficult working conditions and demanded improvement of conditions and wage increases. After 43 days of strikes, the miners suspended their strikes and paused their demands.

== Background ==
Since the dissolution of the Soviet Union in 1991, working conditions in Ukrainian mines have deteriorated. Contracts in the mining industry are frequently violated, leaving workers without pay for several months. By December 2020, the Independent Trade Union of Ukrainian Miners (Ukrainian: Незалежна профспілка гірників України, romanised: Nezalezhna profspilka hirnykiv Ukrainy, abbreviated NPHU) claimed that miners at state-owned miners were owed $60 million in unpaid wages.

Of the 148 mines in Ukraine, 102 are at least partly managed by the government. The privatisation of the Ukrainian mining industry accelerated in 2019 following the election of Ukrainian president Volodymyr Zelenskyy. The Ministry of Energy stated that the government planned to privatise or close all unprofitable, publicly owned mines by 2030. The government further reported that only four of the 33 publicly owned coal mines in the country were profitable. The effort to privatise the Ukrainian mining industry has been met with resistance from Ukrainian miners.

67 Ukrainian mines are located in the Donetsk Oblast, which has been occupied since 2014 as part of the Russo-Ukrainian War. While Ukraine is one of the largest producers of coal in the world, the occupation prompted the government to start importing coal from elsewhere in order to meet demand.

== Timeline ==
=== National coal miner strike (July) ===
Around the beginning of February, coal mines across Ukraine went idle. This resulted in Ukrainian coal miners spending the following five months without pay.

On 30 June, the NPHU organized a strike drawing participants working in private and national coal mines from across the country to rallies in Kyiv. The striking workers demanded that operations in Ukrainian coal mines resume and workers be afforded ₴1.2 billion (US$45.8 million) in back pay for the previous five months.

During the strike, the Ministry of Energy organized negotiations between mining companies and the Ukrainian energy company Centrenergo. Centrenergo is Ukraine's largest domestic consumer of coal. The parties negotiated a contract that would enable the mines to supply Centrenergo with Ukrainian coal for use in thermal power plants. A preliminary agreement with national banks would also provide the energy company with loans to quickly finance renewed coal mining.

The agreement was finalized on 12 July, ending the 11-day strike, re-enabling coal mining in Ukraine and guaranteeing back pay for the workers. Operations resumed as early as 13 July in some mines.

=== Kryvyi Rih Iron Ore Combine strike (September—October) ===
The Kryvyi Rih Iron Ore Combine manages four mines: Oktyabrska, Rodina, Hvardiyska and Ternivskaya. Combined, The mines yield more iron ore than any other combine in the country. Ownership of the plant is shared by Rinat Akhmetov and Ihor Kolomoyskyi, who are the two wealthiest oligarchs in Ukraine. Akhmetov and Kolomoskyi also own Ukraine's two largest media companies. Workers at the Kryvyi Rih plant earn $330 per month.

In 2020, the Kryvyi Rih miners were concerned with degrading working conditions. The combine's administration had recently adopted a piece work payment model, linking workers' pay to the amount of iron ore mined. A workplace audit had also eliminated benefits and allowances previously afforded to the miners. The miners first organized a strike on 3 September, demanding a re-examination of the audit, the firing of the plant's managers and for the Ukrainian government to review the list of harmful and dangerous professions, which can provide pathways to early retirement. The miners also demanded an increase in wages equivalent to €1000, which would ensure they earned as much as they did prior to the 2014-2015 devaluation of the Ukrainian hryvnia.

Around the same time as the above-ground strikes, some miners decided to stay one kilometer underground in a sit-in strike. At the peak of the strike, the miners' demands were supported by 417 workers. Refusing to enter negotiations, the combine's managers argued the strike was illegal and filed a lawsuit against the workers. The miners remained underground for 43 days. On 15 October, 18 miners surfaced from the Oktyabrska mine, ending the strike. The action, which blocked work in all four of the combine's mines, was one of Ukraine's largest metal industry strikes in recent years.

During the strike, local People's Deputies, officials and Ukraine's deputy minister of the economy met with workers. The government encouraged the workers to come to a compromise with the combine's management. Families of the strikers said they experienced harassment by private security firms, police, government security services and local military conscription offices. More broadly, the strike received minimal attention in national Ukrainian media. The workers argued the lack of coverage was a result of censorship, given Kolomoiskyi and Akhmetov's involvement in Ukraine's two largest media companies.

The strike was ended by an agreement with the combine's management, giving workers increased wages, improved safety and supply of equipment, back pay for the time workers spent on strike and promises to not prosecute participants and maintain worker benefits.

One day following the agreement, Kryvyi Rih courts started examining the managers' suit to determine if the 417 workers' action was illegal. The strike precipitated several other miner strikes around the country.

=== Kirovohrad uranium mine strike (December) ===
Energoatom is a state-owned nuclear energy monopoly and Ukraine's only consumer of uranium. The Eastern Mining and Processing Plant (VostGOK), also a state-owned enterprise, supplies uranium to Energoatom. Ukrainian mines yielded 801 tons of uranium in 2019.

As a part of a dispute between the two enterprises, VostGOK claimed that Energoatom failed to pay it $5 million that would have covered mining operations and salaries, which Energoatom disputed. As a result, three mines in the Kirovohrad Oblast closed and 5,000 miners in the region were put on unpaid leave.

A central concern in the dispute was that if the mines stopped operating and the mines' water pumps failed, they may contaminate the ground water with uranium. Such a contamination would have far-reaching environmental impacts throughout central Ukraine. Following the decision, Kirovohrad miners travelled to Kyiv in early December to protest in front of the presidential office. Around the same time, several strikes led by miners were organized around the country, largely in protest of unpaid wages. The strikers organized strikes and sit-ins, and declared their intention to block roads and shut down city centers if their demands were unmet.

== See also ==
- No to capitulation!
