= Health Workers' Union of Ukraine =

Ukrainian trade union

- Профспілка працівників охорони здоров’я України
- Abbreviation: Medprof
- Predecessor: Ukrainian Council of the Trade Union of Medical Workers
- Established: 1990; 36 years ago
- Type: Trade union
- Location: Ukraine
- Field: Healthcare
- Members: 747,000 (2019)
- Official language: Ukrainian
- Affiliations: Federation of Trade Unions of Ukraine (FPU)
- Website: lviv.medprof.org.ua

The Health Workers' Union of Ukraine (Ukrainian: Профспілка працівників охорони здоров’я України, Medprof) is a trade union representing workers in the healthcare sector in Ukraine.

The union was established in 1990, as the successor of the Ukrainian Council of the Trade Union of Medical Workers. It affiliated to the Federation of Trade Unions of Ukraine. At the start of 2011, it had 1,128,525 members, but by 2019, its membership had fallen to 747,000.
