= Trade Union of Workers of Metallurgical and Mining Industries of Ukraine =

The Trade Union of Workers of Metallurgical and Mining Industries of Ukraine (Ukrainian: Профспілка трудящих металургійної і гірничодобувної промисловості України, PMGU) is a trade union representing workers in the mining and metalworking industries in Ukraine and Moldova.

The union was established on 5 September 1990. It affiliated to the Federation of Trade Unions of Ukraine (FPU). By 2019, it was the fourth-largest affiliate of the FPU, with 290,000 members.
