= Abraham Siegel =

American academic administrator

Abraham J. Siegel (November 6, 1922 - January 16, 2011) was Dean (from 1980 to 1987), and later Howard W. Johnson Professor of Management Emeritus in the MIT Sloan School of Management.

== List of Publications ==
=== Books (contributor) ===
- The Public Interest in National Labor Policy (by an Independent Study Group), Committee for Economic Development., New York, 1961.
- A Work in Progress, The MIT Sloan School of Management 2002: Looking Back, Moving Forward, MIT Sloan School of Management, 2002.

=== Books (editor) ===
- Abraham J. Siegel, ed., The Impact of Computers in Collective Bargaining, MIT Press, 1970. ISBN 9780262190633.
- Abraham J. Siegel and David B. Lipsky, eds., Unfinished Business: An Agenda for Labor, Management, and the Public, MIT Press, 1978. ISBN 0-262-19175-X
