= 1990s Donbas miners' strikes =

Strikes in eastern Ukraine during the 1990s

1990s Donbas miner strikes
- Part of the 1989–1991 Ukrainian revolution (until 1991)
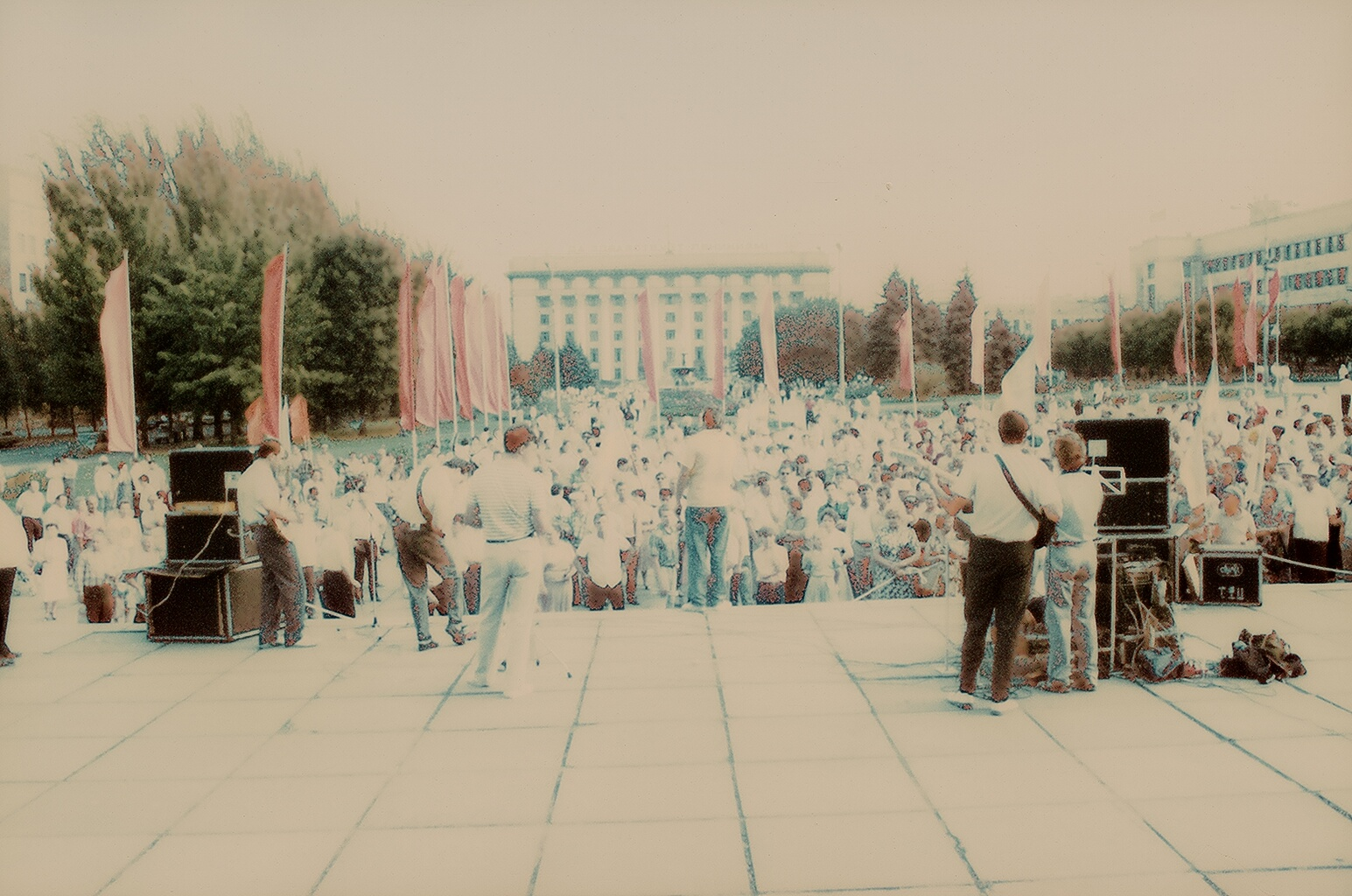
- Miners protesting near the Ministry of Coal Industry building (Donetsk, 1990)
- Date: 15 July 1989 – 19 June 1993; 1 February 1996 – 1997; May–24 August 1998
- Location: Ukraine (Note: Ukrainian SSR, Soviet Union until 1991) (Mainly Donbas)
- Caused by: 1989–1993: Communist Party committees within businesses (until 1991); Low wages; Era of Stagnation; High food prices; Distrust of trade unions in the Soviet Union; 1996–1997, 1998: Low wages; Non-payment of wages; End of coal industry subsidies
- Goals: 1989–1991: Resignation of Volodymyr Shcherbytsky and Valentyna Shevchenko; End of one-party rule; Raising of wages; Economic independence of the Ukrainian SSR from the Soviet Union; Adoption of the Declaration of State Sovereignty of Ukraine; End of Communist Party committees within businesses; Resignation of Mikhail Gorbachev, Volodymyr Shcherbytsky, and Valentyna Shevchenko (politician); Trade union independence; Direct elections; 1991–1993, 1996–1997, 1998: Paying of wages; Raising of wages
- Methods: Strike action, political demonstration, sit-in
- Concessions: 1989–1991: Resignation of Volodymyr Shcherbytsky as First Secretary of the Communist Party of Ukraine; Economic independence of the Ukrainian SSR from the Soviet Union; Declaration of State Sovereignty of Ukraine adopted; End of Communist Party committees within businesses; 1991–1993: 1994 parliamentary and presidential elections held early; Resignation of the Krasnodon municipal government; 1996–1997, 1998: Payment of wages

Parties
Miners; Independent Trade Union of Ukrainian Miners; Supported by: People's Movement of Ukraine	Soviet Union (until 1991) (Ukrainian Soviet Socialist Republic) Government of Ukraine: Donetsk Oblast; Luhansk Oblast; Berkut

Lead figures
Volodymyr Biletskyy; Mykola Volynko; Mykhailo Volynets	(Ukrainian Soviet Socialist Republic) Volodymyr Shcherbytsky; (Ukrainian Soviet Socialist Republic) (Ukraine) Leonid Kravchuk; (Ukraine) Leonid Kuchma; Donetsk Oblast: (Ukrainian Soviet Socialist Republic) Viktor Kurchenko; (Ukraine) Yuriy Smyrnov; (Ukraine) Viktor Yanukovych; Luhansk Oblast: (Ukrainian Soviet Socialist Republic) Anatoliy Kasianov; (Ukraine) Eduard Khananov; (Ukraine) Hennadiy Fomenko; (Ukraine) Oleksandr Yefremov; (Ukraine) Viktor Tikhonov

Number
500,000–1.5 million (1993); 800,000 (1996)	

Casualties and losses
1 dead (suicide); 22 injured	15 injured

Strikes by coal miners in the eastern Donbas region of Ukraine occurred throughout most of the 1990s. Beginning in 1989, coal miners went on strike against poor pay amidst poor economic conditions. Originally part of the 1989 Soviet miners' strikes, the demands of miners in the Donbas also reflected sentiments in favour of Ukrainian nationalism, and they were supported publicly by pro-independence groups such as the People's Movement of Ukraine.

== Background and early strikes ==
By 1989, the Donbas region in the eastern part of the Ukrainian Soviet Socialist Republic was in a state of severe economic decline. As part of the Era of Stagnation, the region's industrial economy had significantly declined. More broadly, the state response to the 1986 Chernobyl disaster, Russification, and the Revolutions of 1989 had generated increased distaste for First Secretary Volodymyr Shcherbytsky's government throughout Ukraine. Additionally, in pursuit of Stakhanovite goals of increased productivity, safety requirements were neglected.

Outside Ukraine, broader Soviet policies and conditions encouraged the emergence of the strikes. The Twelfth Five-Year Plan had originally forecasted 9.2 billion rubles (equivalent to €551.3 billion in 2024) to improving working conditions in the coal industry, but this had been gradually slashed by over a billion over time as a result of budget constraints. The plan called for coal production to be increased by 12.5 million tonnes over the course of the plan; instead, it would decrease by 2.3 million tonnes by the plan's end in 1990. The failures of Perestroika frustrated workers, and widespread shortages for basic necessities like soap led to tensions reaching a boiling point.

== 1989–1991 strikes ==
On 10 July 1989, coal miners in the Kuznetsk Basin region went on strike, citing poor pay. Word of the strikes soon spread to coal-mining regions throughout the Soviet Union, particularly the Donbas. Following the Kuzbass workers, miners at Yasynova-Hluboka mine in Makiivka went on strike on 15 July 1989. The first strikes' demands were primarily higher wages and increased social protections. In addition to these economic demands, however, many miners were sympathetic to the cause of Ukrainian independence, viewing it as a means of achieving self-governance from the Soviet Union. Some mines outside the city of Donetsk initially refused to join the strikes out of fear of government retaliation, but were eventually convinced to join.

The response from Shcherbytsky's government was largely negative. State media discredited the miners or avoided discussing the matter outright, and disrupted communications between the 28 mines that first went on strike. This hampered the ability of the strikers to successfully organise strikes at other mines, though they were joined by a pipe plant in Makiivka. On 27 August 1989 the strikers demanded resignation of Soviet Ukraine's top leadership. Facing increasingly agitated rhetoric from miners and a Communist Party of the Soviet Union that sought to remove the last vestiges of Brezhnev's rule, Shcherbytsky chose to resign rather than continue governing Ukraine in September 1989. Chair of the Supreme Soviet Valentyna Shevchenko also resigned.

The resignations were celebrated as a victory for the miners, but by that point demands had become more political, demanding Ukraine's economic independence and increased autonomy from the Soviet Union. Miners' representatives were present at the constituent assembly of the People's Movement of Ukraine in September 1989. A two-hour strike on 1 November 1989 protested the rule of Mikhail Gorbachev, demanding an end to the Communist Party's one-party rule and direct elections to the office of President of the Soviet Union. A vote by the regional strike committee to go on strike in all of Donetsk Oblast ended in a 14–14 deadlock. Miners complained that shortages were still widespread, and additionally called for a parliamentary committee on government corruption. Demands for Ukraine to decouple its economic management from the broader Soviet Union was met by the Supreme Soviet of the Ukrainian Soviet Socialist Republic in August 1990, with the Law on the Ukrainian SSR's Economic Independence.

One of the biggest strikes began on 1 March 1991, following the collapse of negotiations between the workers' councils and prime minister Vitold Fokin. Supported by the pro-independence People's Movement of Ukraine (abbr. Rukh) organisation, the strikes brought the conflict to a new level, calling for Gorbachev's resignation, the dissolution of the Council of People's Deputies, and recognition of the 1990 Declaration of State Sovereignty of Ukraine. They were supported by miners from the Lviv-Volyn coal basin, who marched to the Ukrainian capital of Kyiv. The leaders of Rukh met with miners in Donetsk, and in April 1991 miners occupied the main Khreshchatyk street in Kyiv.

Between March and May 1991 49 mines in Donbas were striking, which represented 40% of the total number of mining enterprises in the region. The action was joined by 22 mines in Lviv Oblast. Strike committees declared motions of non-confidence to official professional committees and demanded the elimination of Communist Party organizations in enterprises. At Zasyadko coal mine the local party secretary was for the first time elected in a democratic manner, disregarding the instructions of the Central Committee. Following the 1991 Soviet coup attempt and subsequent Declaration of Independence of Ukraine, strikes did not come to an end, although they decreased in strength and focused primarily on the payment of unpaid wages.

== 1993 strikes ==
In the face of the post-independence economic downturn experienced by Ukraine and the non-payment of miners' wages, Donetsk miners began a strike on 7 June 1993. The strikes quickly grew in scale, encompassing all of Donetsk and Luhansk oblasts and reaching into parts of Dnipropetrovsk and Kharkiv oblasts. Around 228 mines participated in the strikes, with the total number of participants being between 500,000 and 1.5 million. The latter number would make the 1993 strike the largest singular protest in Ukrainian history, surpassing the 2013–2014 Euromaidan. Popular anger was directed at President Leonid Kravchuk's refusal to liberalise the economy, with a report by The New York Times describing strike leaders as sounding like "born-again capitalist[s]".

Contrary to the previous strikes, this strike also involved directors of mines, with director of the Donetsk-based October Mine Yuri Byelomestnov referring to the strikes as a "director's strike". Miners called for their pay to be doubled and for economic connections with foreign countries (particularly Russia, a vital supplier of fuel to Ukraine) to be strengthened, as well as for a referendum on both the Verkhovna Rada and Kravchuk's presidency. The pay increases were criticised by Rukh parliamentarian Mykhailo Shvaika, who noted that it would cause prices to increase by several times more than wages.

Conceding to the demands of the strikes, Kravchuk's government first promoted Yukhym Zvyahilsky, a member of the Donetsk Clan of oligarchs, as First Deputy Prime Minister of Ukraine. Later, they also held presidential and parliamentary elections in 1994. As a result of the elections, Kravchuk was replaced by former Prime Minister Leonid Kuchma.

=== Autonomy debate ===
The political nature of the strikes, in particular calls for autonomy, has been subject to some dispute. The main rallying cry of the protests, that residents of the Donbas "can feed themselves", has been described as either based on opposition to Ukrainian independence and support for Russophilia or as a broader call for decentralisation involving all of Ukraine.

== 1996–1997 strikes ==
The miners' strikes returned on 1 February 1996, again citing unpaid wages. The strikes occurred simultaneously with coal miners' strikes in Russia, similarly based on low pay (though Russian strikes also included elements of opposition to the First Chechen War). The simultaneous strikes reached from the Donbas to the Russian Far East, and were also supported by coal miners in western Ukraine. Other issues included a proposal by the World Bank to shut down 114 of Ukraine's 227 active mines in order to restore profitability to the industry. In an effort to increase pressure on the government, railway lines and highways were blocked by miners, with only food supplies and ambulances being let through.

The total number of workers who went on strike in 1996 and 1997 was much lower than in 1989–1991 or 1993, numbering at 2,700 according to NATO research fellow Elena Kurilo. In response to the strikes, the government took a hard line, arresting leaders and defaming striking workers on television. The disruption of the strikes caused by the arrests and court proceedings eventually brought an end to the strikes without concessions. However, workers' resentment continued to grow, eventually peaking a year later.

== 1998 strikes ==
Beginning in 1998, a convoy of about 5,000 miners from the western Donbas and Pavlohrad began to march towards the city of Dnipropetrovsk, seeking payment of 8–9 months' worth of wages. From there, a group of around 1,000 miners marched on to Kyiv. In an effort to counter government propaganda, an independent television channel led by former miners from Pavlohrad also travelled alongside the convoy, interviewing strikers.

The convoy attracted widespread sympathy from the Ukrainian public, and the symbol of miners' orange helmets being pounded on pavement became a widespread symbol of discontent with Kuchma's government. Individuals donated food and water to the convoy, with so much being sent that two busloads of food were donated by the miners to orphanages. Ukrainian nationalist and left-wing parties also expressed support for the strikes, though workers emphasised their apolitical goals. The convoy reached the capital on 29 May, and began blockading the Presidential Office Building, the Government Building, and the Verkhovna Rada building, camping on Trukhaniv Island. Prime Minister Valeriy Pustovoitenko met with strike leader Mykhailo Volynets and described payment of wages as a "priority", but negotiations stalled amidst parliamentary infighting until an agreement to pay all wages was finally reached on 17 June 1998, and the convoy's participants returned home.

=== Luhansk anti-Berkut clashes ===
Following the end of the convoy, local-level strikes continued. Among these was one in the city of Luhansk, in which three Krasnodon-based mines launched a picket at the offices of the Luhansk Oblast Council and the Governor of Luhansk Oblast. Beginning on 15 July 1998, the strike continued until 24 August, when members of the Berkut special police force attacked the miners. The strikers retaliated violently, and in the ensuing clashes 22 workers, 12 Berkut officers, and three other law enforcement officers were injured. The incident has sometimes been incorrectly referred to as the first instance of law enforcement attacking a peaceful protest in Ukraine, but it was preceded by the 1995 Funeral of Patriarch Volodymyr of Kyiv.

Later, smaller-scale protests also took place in Luhansk Oblast during the remainder of 1998, including the self-immolation of miner Oleksandr Mykhailevych in December. The next year, strikes did not take place, owing to the payment of wages, the fatigue of workers, and disagreements among the leaders of independent trade unions.

== Decline of the movement ==
Although miners' strikes eventually reached their goal of removing the Communist nomenklatura from power, they failed to achieve a long-term democratization of politics. In the absence of real social lifts, political power in Donbas was transferred to so-called "Red directors" - former enterprise managers and technocrats, who had previously served as deputies of Communist officials. The weakness of central governments in Kyiv contributed to the rise of the Donetsk Clan, whose leaders employed organized crime in order to subdue the workers' movement. Political mottos of the strikers were gradually silenced through the policies of the new local elite, which solidified its power through provision of material benefits and cheap entertainment to workers. The emergence of regionalist forces such as the International Movement of Donbass further contributed to the erosion of the workers' movement. As a result, by the late 1990s many strikes were organized in the interests of mining management and owners, with striking miners fulfilling their orders.

According to Mykhailo Volynets, people's deputy and head of the Independent Trade Union of Ukrainian Miners, independent trade unions enjoyed freedom during the tenures of Gorbachev and Kravchuk, but following the election of Leonid Kuchma as president of Ukraine their activities were systematically hindered by authorities through the use of blackmail, threats and criminal persecution, as a result of which part of workers' organizations was subordinated to the government. Repressions against trade union activists resumed with new force under the presidency of Viktor Yanukovych, with the Federation of Trade Unions of Ukraine attempting to establish monopoly of government-controlled unions on workers' representation in Ukraine and abroad.

== Legacy ==
The miners' strikes of 1989 were the largest in the Soviet Union. They were also the origin of the 1989–1991 Ukrainian revolution, which eventually resulted in Ukrainian independence and the dissolution of the Soviet Union. Later strikes have failed to replicate the success of the 1990s in terms of scale or public support. In present-day Ukraine, the miners' strikes are regarded as particularly important as demonstrating the role of the Donbas in establishing Ukraine's independence from the Soviet Union. The strikes' nature as a collective action to improve Ukrainians' status has also achieved importance since the beginning of the Russo-Ukrainian War, and been compared by some, such as Euromaidan Press journalist Olena Makarenko, to the civil volunteer movement helping Ukrainian forces in the war in Donbas. In the Donbas, the strikes are sometimes referred to as the "Miners' Revolution" (Ukrainian: Шахтарська революція, romanized: Shakhtarska revoliutsia; Russian: Шахтёрская революция, romanized: Shakhtyorskaya revolyutsiya).

== Bibliography ==
- Abibok, Yulia; Hrytsak, Pavlo (2021). "Searching for Safe Haven: Donbas Discourses of the 1989–91 Miners' Strikes". Region. 10 (1). Slavica Publishers: 9–32. ISSN 2166-4307. JSTOR 27127994.
