= Confederation of Free Trade Unions of Ukraine =

National trade union center in Ukraine

- Конфедерація вільних профспілок України
- Abbreviation: KVPU
- Predecessor: Co-ordinating Council of Free Trade Unions of Ukraine
- Founded: November 1993
- Type: Trade union center
- Headquarters: Kyiv, Ukraine
- Location: Ukraine
- Members: 16 trade unions (2019)
- Official language: Ukrainian
- Key people: Mykhailo Volynets (Chair)
- Affiliations: ITUC, ETUC
- Website: kvpu.org.ua/en/

The Confederation of Free Trade Unions of Ukraine (KVPU) (Ukrainian: Конфедерація вільних профспілок України) is a national trade union center in Ukraine. It is affiliated with the International Trade Union Confederation and the European Trade Union Confederation.

The federation's origins lie in the Co-ordinating Council of Free Trade Unions of Ukraine, formed during the collapse of the Soviet Union. In November 1993, the council was refounded as the KVPU. Its founding affiliates were:

- Federation Trade Union of Ukrainian Aviation Dispatchers
- Free Trade Union of Locomotive Engineers
- Independent Trade Union of Ukrainian Miners
- Trade Union Association of Ukrainian Civil Aviation Pilots
- Trade Union of Air Engineers
- Trade Union of Textile Workers

In 1996, a dispute over the leadership led the founding affiliates to withdraw, although this was later resolved.

It is one of the few trade unions in Ukraine recognized by the American AFL-CIO as "being independent and honest in its representation of the interests of labor".

In October 2022, it was granted affiliate status to the European Trade Union Confederation.

== Affiliates ==
The following unions were affiliated in 2019:

Union
All-Ukrainian Industrial Trade Union
All-Ukrainian Parliament of Able-bodied and Disabled People
All-Ukrainian Trade Union "Native Land"
All-Ukrainian Trade Union "Protection of Justice"
Association of Free Trade Unions of Motorists
Association of Independent Trade Unions of Aviation Workers
Free Trade Union of Education and Science of Ukraine
Free Trade Union of Entrepreneurs of Ukraine
Free Trade Union of Kyiv Metro Workers
Free Trade Union of Medical Workers of Ukraine
Free Trade Union of Railway Workers of Ukraine
Independent Media Trade Union of Ukraine
Independent Trade Union of Miners of Ukraine
Kryvyi Rih City Trade Union of Industrial Workers
Trade Union - Civil Aviation Flight Association
Trade Union "Social Protection of Workers"
