= Federation of Trade Unions of Ukraine =

FPU (ФПУ)
- Federation of Trade Unions
- Федерація профспілок України
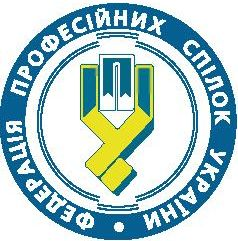
- Founded: 1991
- Headquarters: Trade Unions Building, Kyiv
- Members: 4.8 million
- Key people: Grygorii Osovyi (President)
- Affiliations: ITUC, ETUC
- Website: http://www.fpsu.org.ua

The Federation of Trade Unions of Ukraine (known by its Ukrainian acronym, FPU) is the largest trade union centre in Ukraine, with more than 4.8 million members. As of 1 August 2019, 44 national trade unions and 27 regional trade unions were affiliated to the FPU.

It is headquartered in the historic Trade Unions Building in Kyiv.

== Organisation and activities ==
The aim of the FPU is to express and represent the interests and protect the rights of its member organisations, coordinate their collective actions, promote unity in the trade union movement, represent and protect labour and the socio-economic rights and interests of trade union members before state and local authorities, represent the interests of members in their relationship with employers and their organisations and represent its members in interactions with other citizens’ associations.

The FPU main tasks are protection of labour, socio-economic rights and interests of trade union members; social protection of trade union members and their families; legal protection of trade union members; strengthening of FPU influence on political life and in the formation of the civil society; improvement of the social contract with other trade unions, employers and the state; cooperating with other trade unions and their associations; building and maintaining the equality of rights and opportunities for men and women; strengthening the FPU as a democratic trade union and strengthening and widening FPU international relations.

At the international level, the FPU is affiliated with the International Trade Union Confederation and Pan-European Regional Council.

The FPU is participating in the United Nations Global Compact and has a consultative status with the UN ECOSOC.

== History ==
The Federation of Independent Trade Unions of Ukraine was established after Ukraine became independent on 6 October 1990. It was a successor to the Ukrainian Republican Council of Trade Unions, which was part of the All-Union Central Council of Trade Unions. The declaration creating the FPU was signed by 25 national and 24 regional trade unions.

In November 1992, at its Second (Extraordinary) Congress, the Federation of Independent Trade Unions of Ukraine was renamed the Federation of Trade Unions of Ukraine.

In June and July 2011, the Prosecutor General of Ukraine opened 35 criminal cases against the FPU for alleged misappropriation of sanatoriums. In November, Vasyl Khara, the president of FPU resigned

In 2013 and 2014, during the Euromaidan protests, the union's office in Kyiv, the Trade Unions Building, served as the headquarters for the protesters. As a consequence of the fighting, the building burned to the ground.

In June 2014, a group of people wearing army fatigues bearing the insignia of Right Sector and Social-National Assembly stormed the FPU Council in Kyiv in an attempt to disrupt the election of a new leadership. It was unclear whether they had any relation to the Right Sector and Social-National Assembly group themselves.

In 2020, after the election of Volodymyr Zelenskyy the government doubled down on earlier legal processes to acquire property owned by the FPU. The same year, the Ukrainian State Bureau of Investigation alleged that union officials had sold 80 properties illegally by not consulting with the government before selling.

In 2022, the government passed controversial labour laws that invalidated collective agreements during martial law, legalised zero-hour contracts, increased the maximum legal work day to 12 hours, and allowed employers to fire workers without justification. As a response, the FPU presented a challenge in the Constitutional Court and with the International Labour Organization.

In October 2022, the FPU was granted affiliate status to the European Trade Union Confederation.

In April 2025, the union's president Grygorii Osovyi was put under house arrest along with the leader of the KVPU, amid government moves to seize property owned by the FPU, an action sparking response from the international labour movement. The reasoning for the arrest being misappropriation of property the government sees as their own.

On April 22, the headquarters of the FPU were seized and transferred to a private trust by the Asset Recovery and Management Agency.

== Affiliates ==
Union	Membership (2018)
Agricultural Industry Workers' Union	400,000
Aircraft Builders' Union of Ukraine	55,000
All-Ukrainian Independent Transport Workers' Union	19,700
All-Ukrainian Lawyers' Union of Ukraine	1,400
All-Ukrainian Union 'Football of Ukraine'	1,200
All-Ukrainian Union of Producers and Entrepreneurs	3,100
All-Ukrainian Union of Workers and Entrepreneurs in Trade, Catering and Services	40,800
Automobile and Agricultural Machine Building Workers' Union of Ukraine	36,500
Aviation Workers' Union of Ukraine	18,500
Chemical and Petrochemical Industries Workers' Union of Ukraine	59,900
Coal Industry Workers' Union of Ukraine	74,600
Communications Workers' Union of Ukraine	78,800
Construction and Building Materials Industry Workers' Union of Ukraine	60,300
Consumer Cooperatives Workers' Union of Ukraine	28,300
Culture Workers' Union of Ukraine	148,900
Defence Industry Workers' Union of Ukraine	20,900
Energy and Electrical Industry Workers' Union of Ukraine	122,500
Fishing Industry Workers' Union of Ukraine	18,200
Forest Industries Workers' Union of Ukraine	10,900
Forestry Workers' Union of Ukraine	68,700
Gas Facilities Workers' Union of Ukraine	45,900
Geology, Geodesy and Cartography Workers' Union of Ukraine	10,200
Health Workers' Union of Ukraine	747,600
Housing, Utility, and Domestic Services and Local Industry Workers' Union	197,200
Innovative and Small Enterprises Workers' Union of Ukraine	4,000
Machine Builders and Instrument Makers' Union of Ukraine	10,000
Machine Builders and Metalworkers' Union of Ukraine	75,900
Nuclear Energy and Industry Workers' Union of Ukraine	60,500
Oil and Gas Industry Workers' Union	94,600
Pension Fund Workers' Union of Ukraine	21,000
Radio-electronics and Engineering Workers' Union of Ukraine	18,900
Road Transport and Road Economy Workers' Union of Ukraine	42,200
Sea Transport Workers' Union of Ukraine	30,600
Shipbuilding Workers' Union of Ukraine	20,800
Social Workers' Union of Ukraine	61,200
Space and General Engineering Workers' Union of Ukraine	24,800
State Employees' Union of Ukraine	208,100
Taxi Drivers' Union of Ukraine	8,600
Textile and Light Industry Workers' Union of Ukraine	12,700
Trade Union of Education and Science Workers of Ukraine	1,530,000
Trade Union of Workers of Metallurgical and Mining Industries of Ukraine	289,200
Ukrainian Federation of Trade Union Organisations - Foreign Investments Enterprises, Partnerships, Organisations and Institutions Workers' Union of Ukraine	3,800
Ukrainian River Transport Workers' Union	10,000
Youth Housing Complexes and Local Government Committees Workers' Union of Ukraine	1,000

== Chairs ==
1992: Stoyan Alexander Nikolaevich
2005: Yurkin Alexander Valentinovich
2008: Vasyl Khara
2011: Yuriy Kulyk
2014: Grygorii Osovyi

== See also ==
- Confederation of Free Trade Unions of Ukraine
- National Confederation of the Trade-Union Organizations of Ukraine
- Central Union of Consumer Associations of Ukraine
