= Independent Trade Union of Ukrainian Miners =

- Незалежна профспілка гірників України
- Formation: 1989; 37 years ago
- Founder: Members of strike committees
- Type: Trade union
- Location: Ukraine
- Region served: Ukraine
- Affiliations: Confederation of Free Trade Unions of Ukraine

The Independent Trade Union of Ukrainian Miners (Ukrainian: Незалежна профспілка гірників України, NPGU) is a trade union representing workers in the mining industry in Ukraine.

== History ==
The union was established in 1989, bringing together members of recently formed strike committees. In 1993, it was the most prominent union to participate in establishing the Confederation of Free Trade Unions of Ukraine. Due to a leadership dispute, it withdrew from the confederation in 1996, but soon rejoined.
